= Kayseri =

- Metropolitan municipality
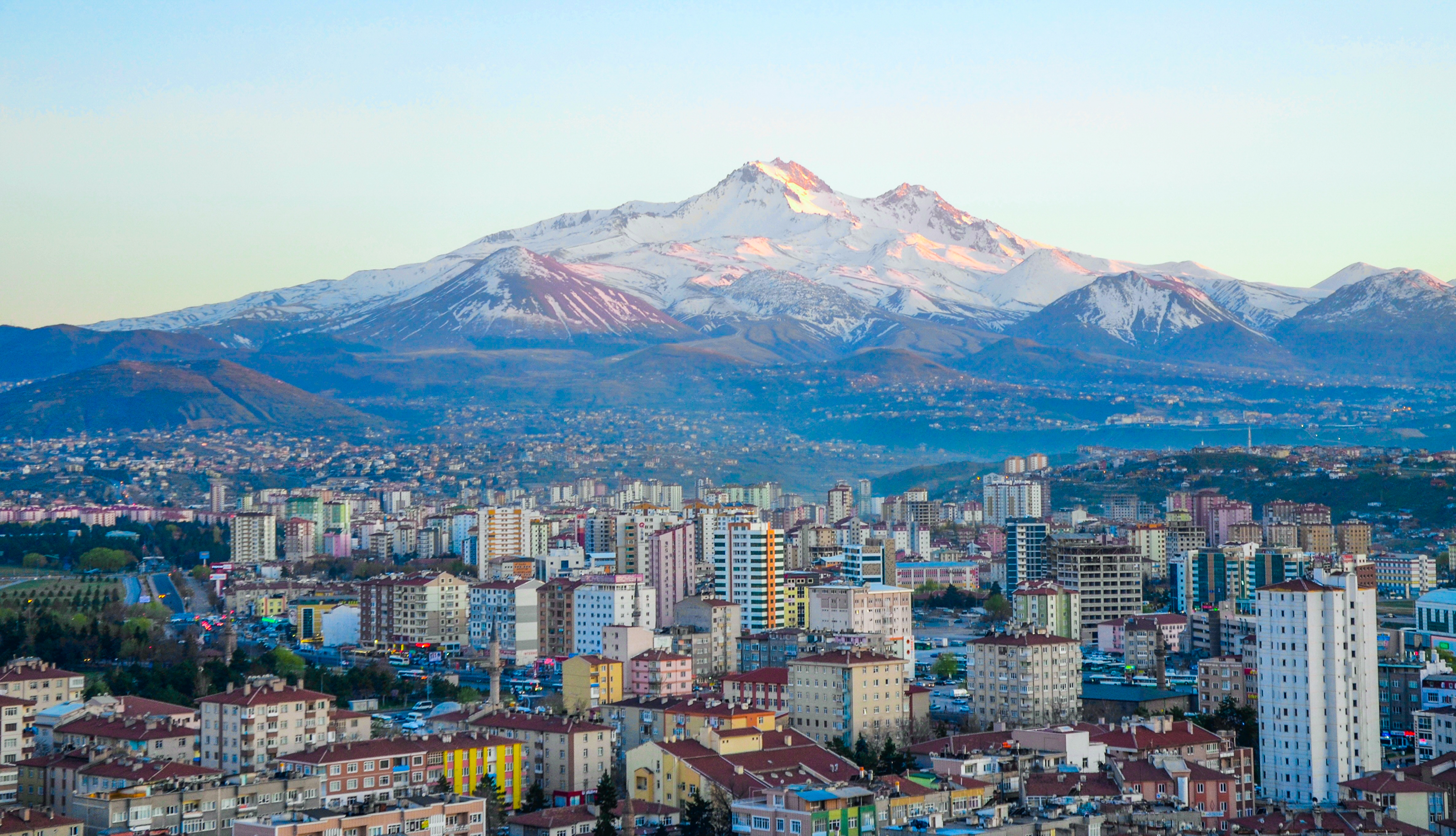
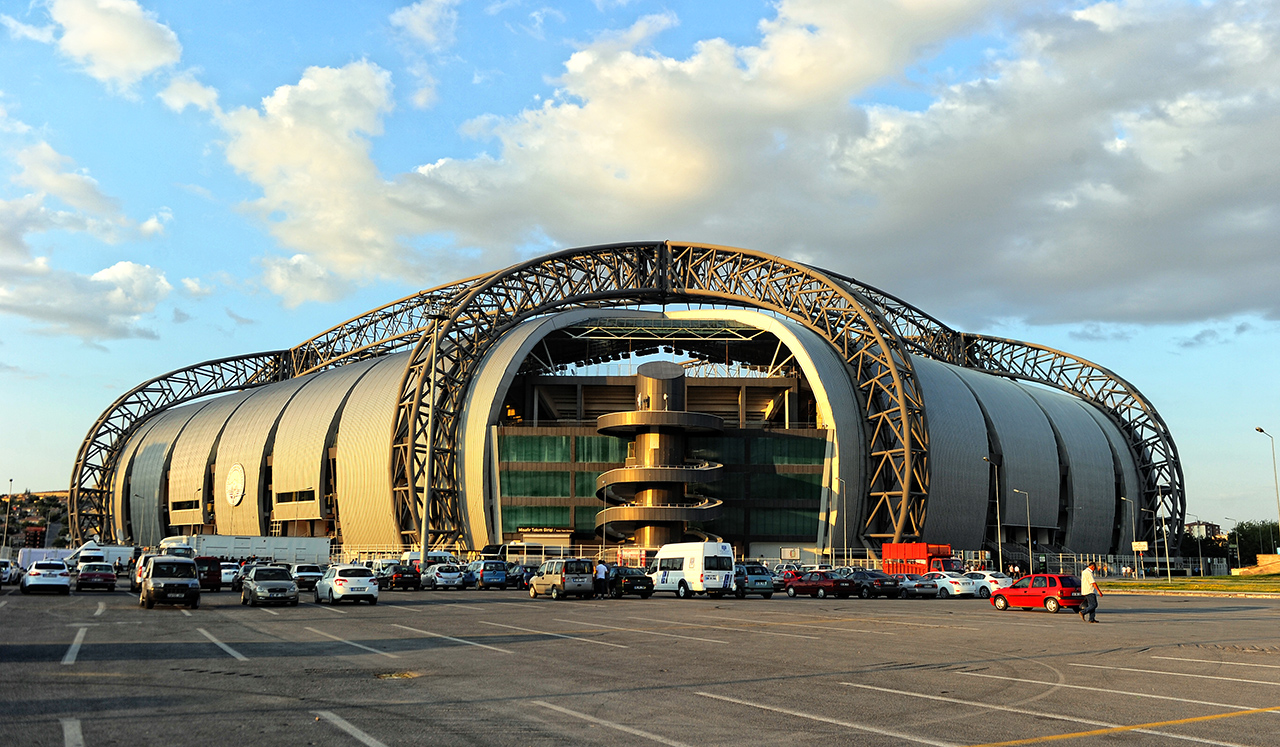
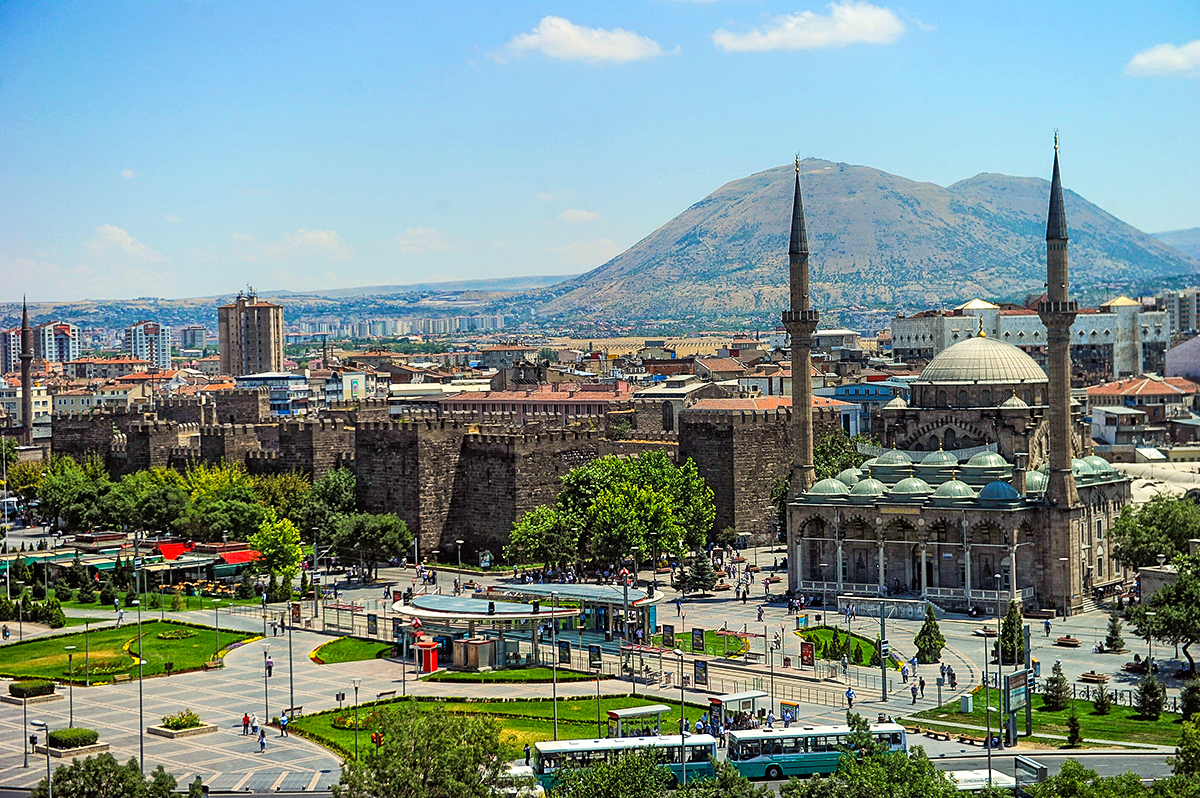
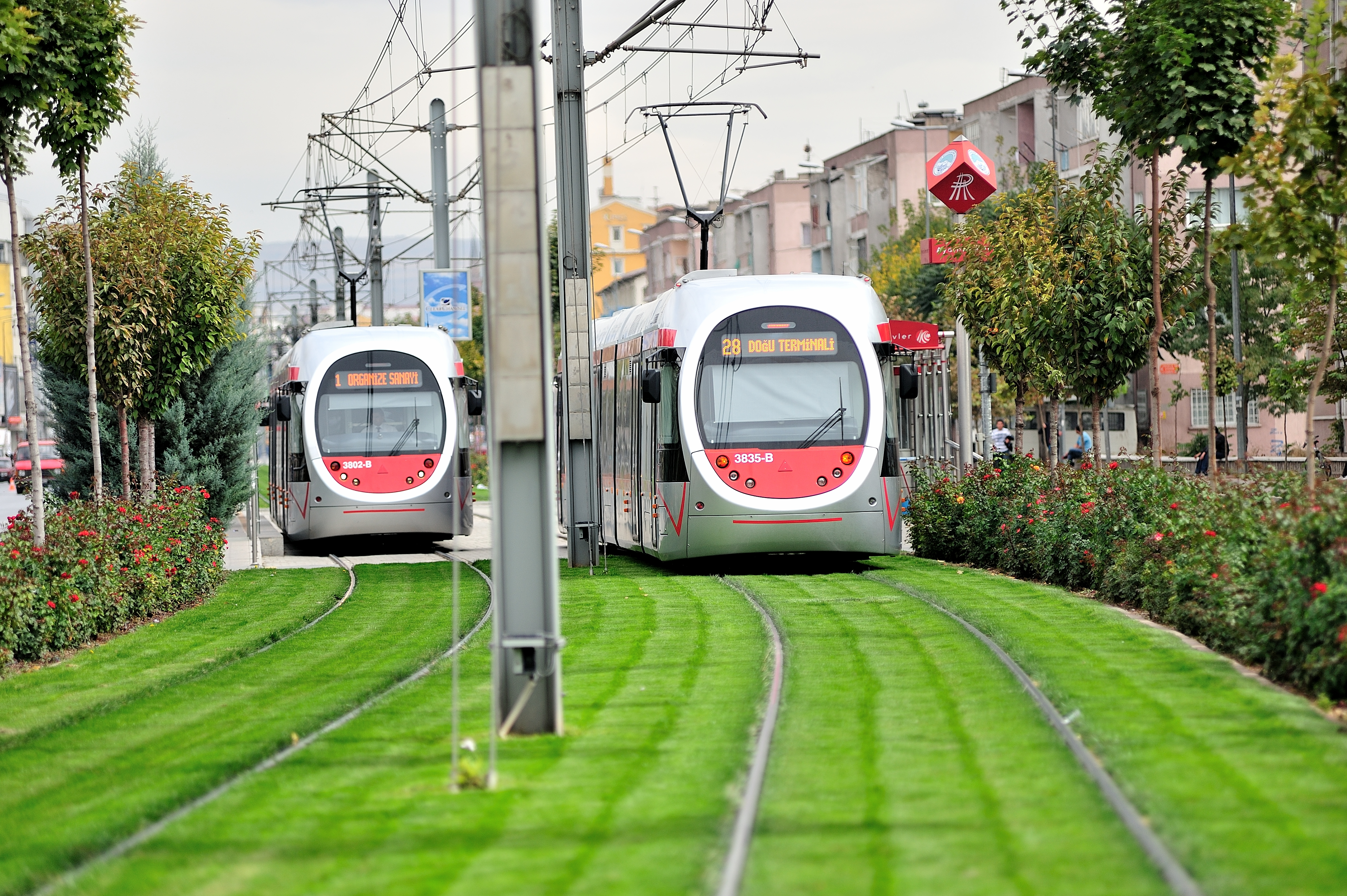
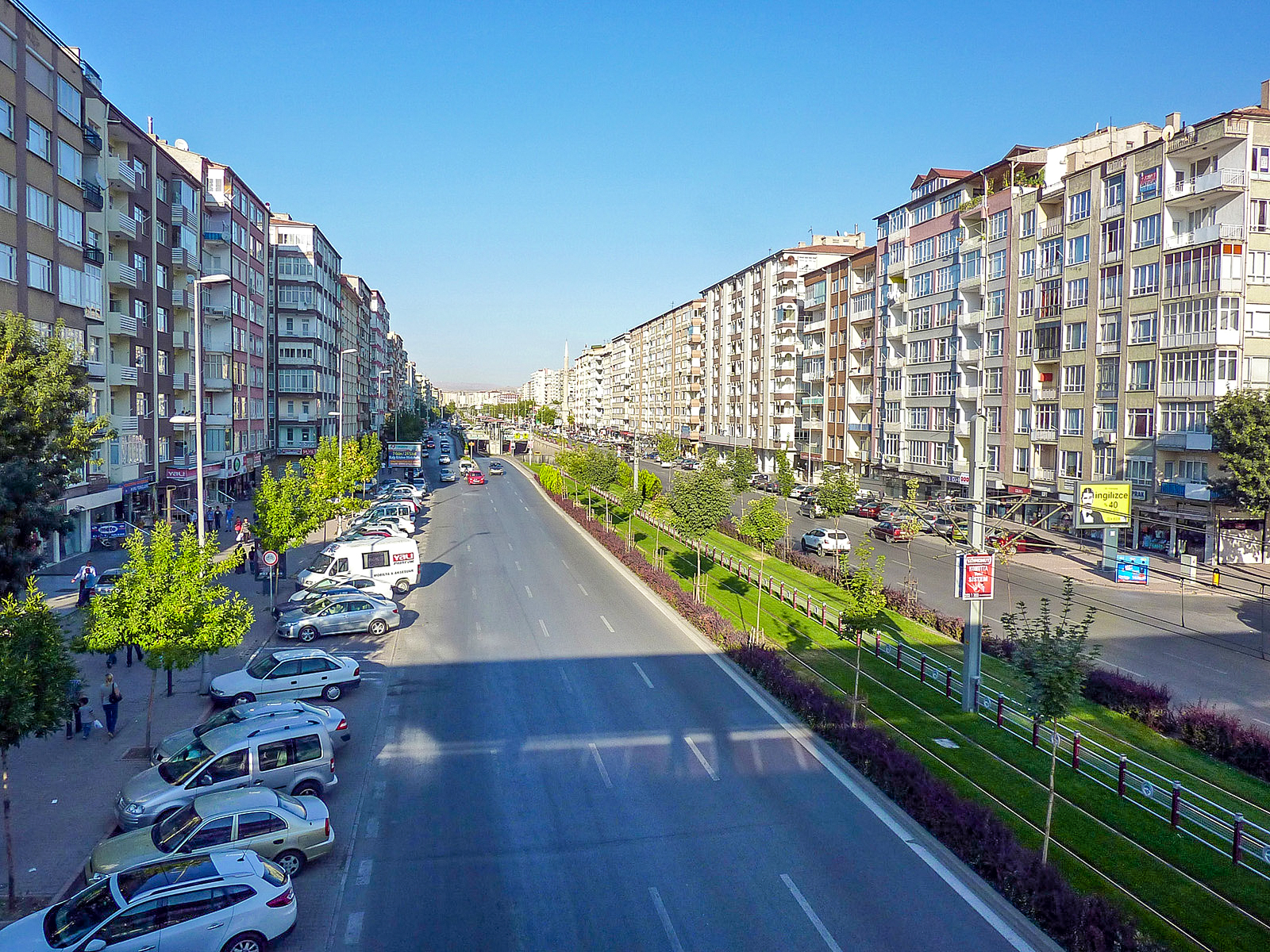
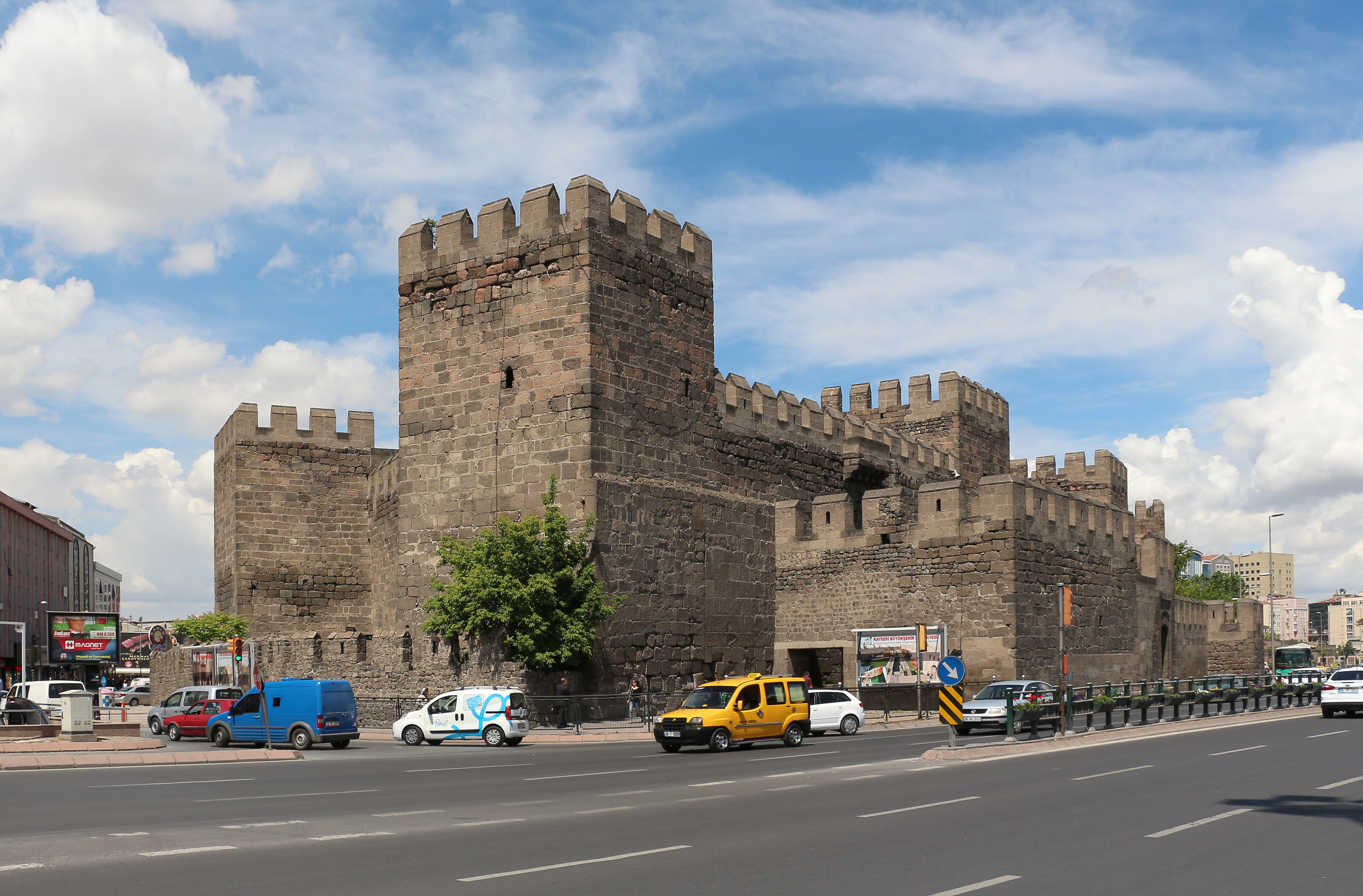
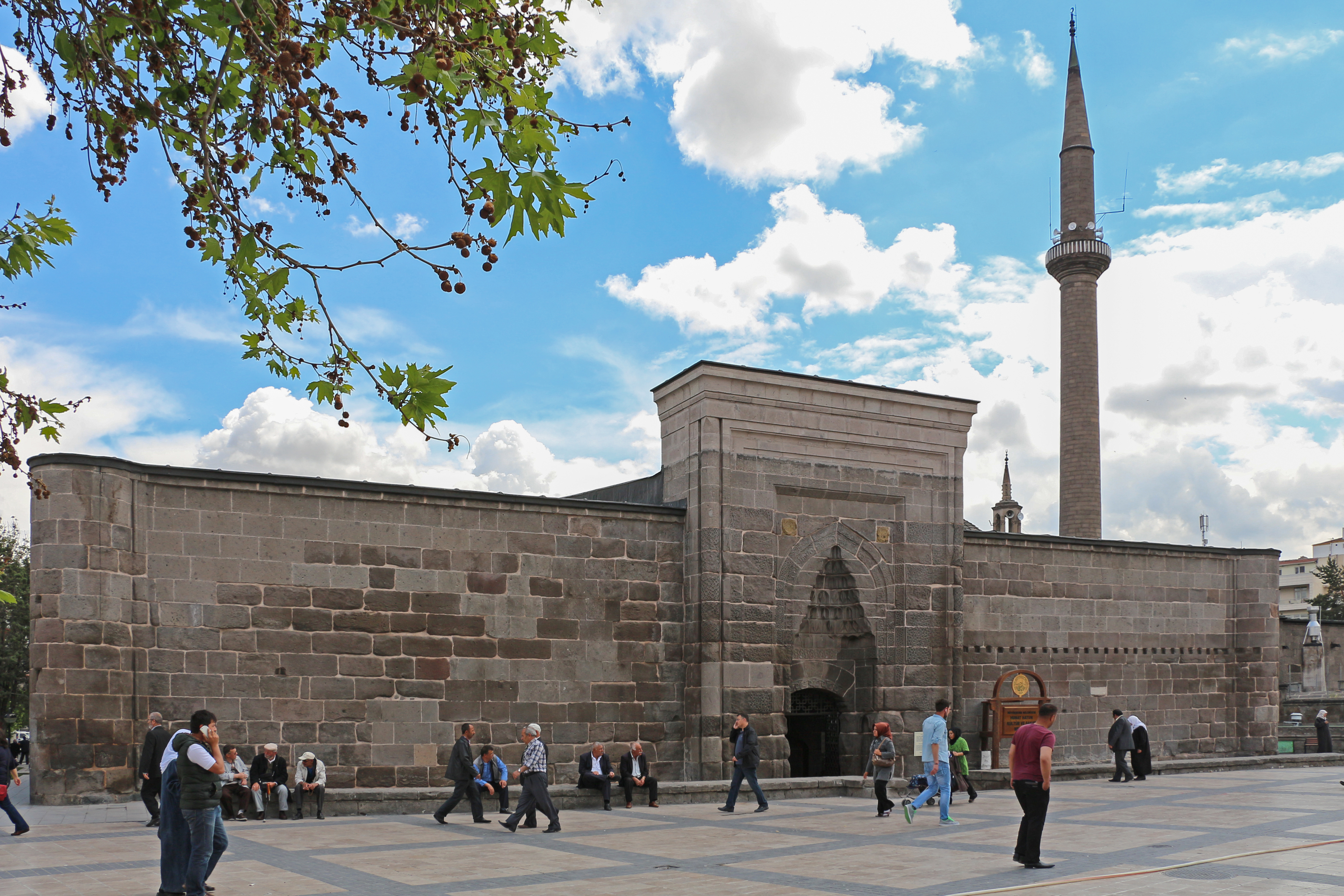
- Clockwise from top: Mount Erciyes, Bürüngüz Mosque in Cumhuriyet Square, Sivas Street, Hunat Hatun Complex, Kayseri Castle, Kayseri Tram, Kadir Has Stadium

- Emblem of Kayseri Metropolitan Municipality

- Location of Kayseri, Turkey Kayseri (Asia)
- Coordinates: 38°43′21″N 35°29′15″E
- Country: Turkey
- Region: Central Anatolia
- Province: Kayseri

Government
  - Mayor: Memduh Büyükkılıç (AK Party)

Area
  - Metropolitan municipality: 17,043 km^{2} (6,580 sq mi)
  - Urban: 3,620 km^{2} (1,400 sq mi)
  - Metro: 2,810 km^{2} (1,080 sq mi)
- Elevation: 1,050 m (3,440 ft)

Population (2024)
  - Metropolitan municipality: 1,452,458
  - Density: 85.223/km^{2} (220.73/sq mi)
  - Urban: 1,210,983
  - Urban density: 335/km^{2} (866/sq mi)

GDP (nominal, 2024)
  - Metropolitan municipality: ₺618.478 billion (US$18.864 billion)
  - Per capita: ₺403,635 (US$12,311)
- Time zone: UTC+3 (TRT)
- Postal code: 38x xx
- Area code: (+90) 352
- Licence plate: 38
- Website: kayseri.bel.tr

Kayseri (Turkish pronunciation: [ˈkajseɾi]) is a large city in Central Anatolia, Turkey, and the capital of Kayseri province. Historically known as Caesarea, it has been the historical capital of Cappadocia since ancient times. The Kayseri Metropolitan Municipality area is composed of five districts: the two central districts of Kocasinan and Melikgazi, and since 2004, also outlying Hacılar, İncesu, and Talas. Kayseri has been selected by TURKSOY as the Cultural Capital of the Turkic World for 2027.

As of 31 December 2024, the province had a population of 1,452,458 of whom 1,210,983 lived in the four urban districts (Melikgazi, Kocasinan, Talas, Incesu), excluding İncesu which is not conurbated, meaning it is not contiguous and has a largely non-protected buffer zone.

Kayseri sits at the foot of Mount Erciyes (Turkish: Erciyes Dağı), a dormant volcano that reaches an altitude of 3,917 metres (12,851 feet), more than 1,500 metres above the city's mean altitude. It contains a number of historic monuments, particularly from the Seljuk period. Tourists often pass through Kayseri en route to the attractions of Cappadocia to the west. Kayseri is known for local dishes such as sucuk, pastırma, and mantı, which are commonly associated with the region.

Kayseri is served by Erkilet International Airport and is home to Erciyes University.

== Etymology ==
Kayseri has been equated with the early Hittite kingdom of Kussara, referenced sporadically in early Assyrian trading records. It was called Mazaka or Mazaca (Armenian: Մաժաք, romanized: Mažak'; according to Armenian tradition, it was founded by and named after Mishak) and was known as such to the geographer Strabo, during whose time it was the capital of the Roman province of Cappadocia, known also as Eusebia at the Argaeus (Εὐσέβεια ἡ πρὸς τῷ Ἀργαίῳ in Greek), after Ariarathes V Eusebes, King of Cappadocia (r. 163–130 BC).

In 14 AD its name was changed by Archelaus (d. 17 AD), the last King of Cappadocia (r. 36 BC–14 AD) and a Roman vassal, to "Caesarea in Cappadocia" (to distinguish it from other cities with the name Caesarea in the Roman Empire) in honour of Caesar Augustus upon his death. This name was rendered as Καισάρεια (Kaisáreia) in Koine Greek, the dialect of the later Byzantine (Eastern Roman) Empire, and it remained in use by the natives (nowadays known as Cappadocian Greeks, due to their spoken language, but then referred to as Rum due to their previous Roman citizenship) until their expulsion from Turkey in 1924. (Note that letter C in classical Latin was pronounced K. This pronunciation was adapted by the Arabs, who called the city Kaisariyah (قيصرية), and the Turks, who gave the city its current name Kayseri (قیصری)).

== History ==
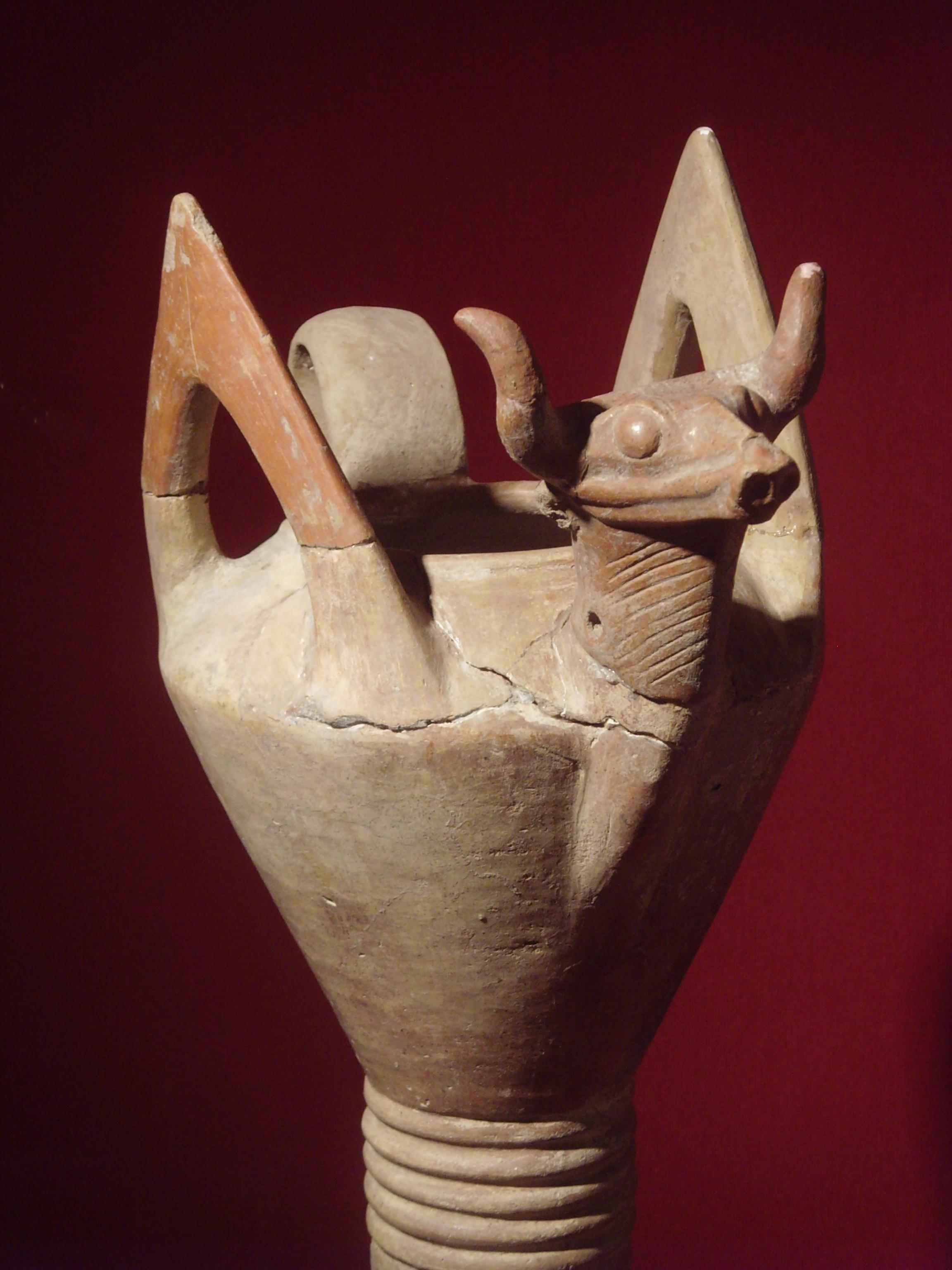
Decorated ceramic bowl from the Hittite period found in Kültepe.

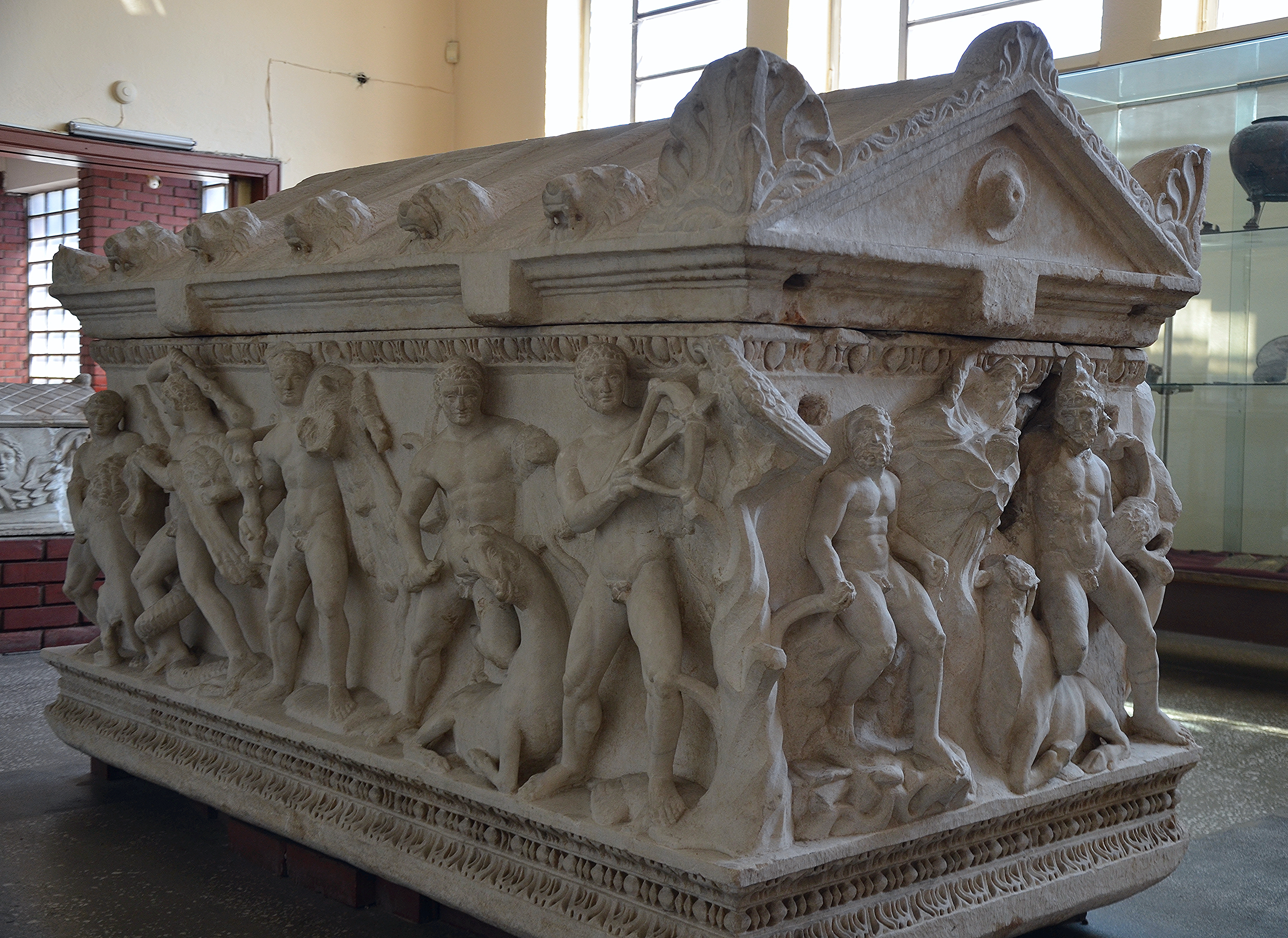
The Hercules Sarcophagus depicting the Twelve Labours of Hercules, 150–160 AD, Kayseri Archaeological Museum.

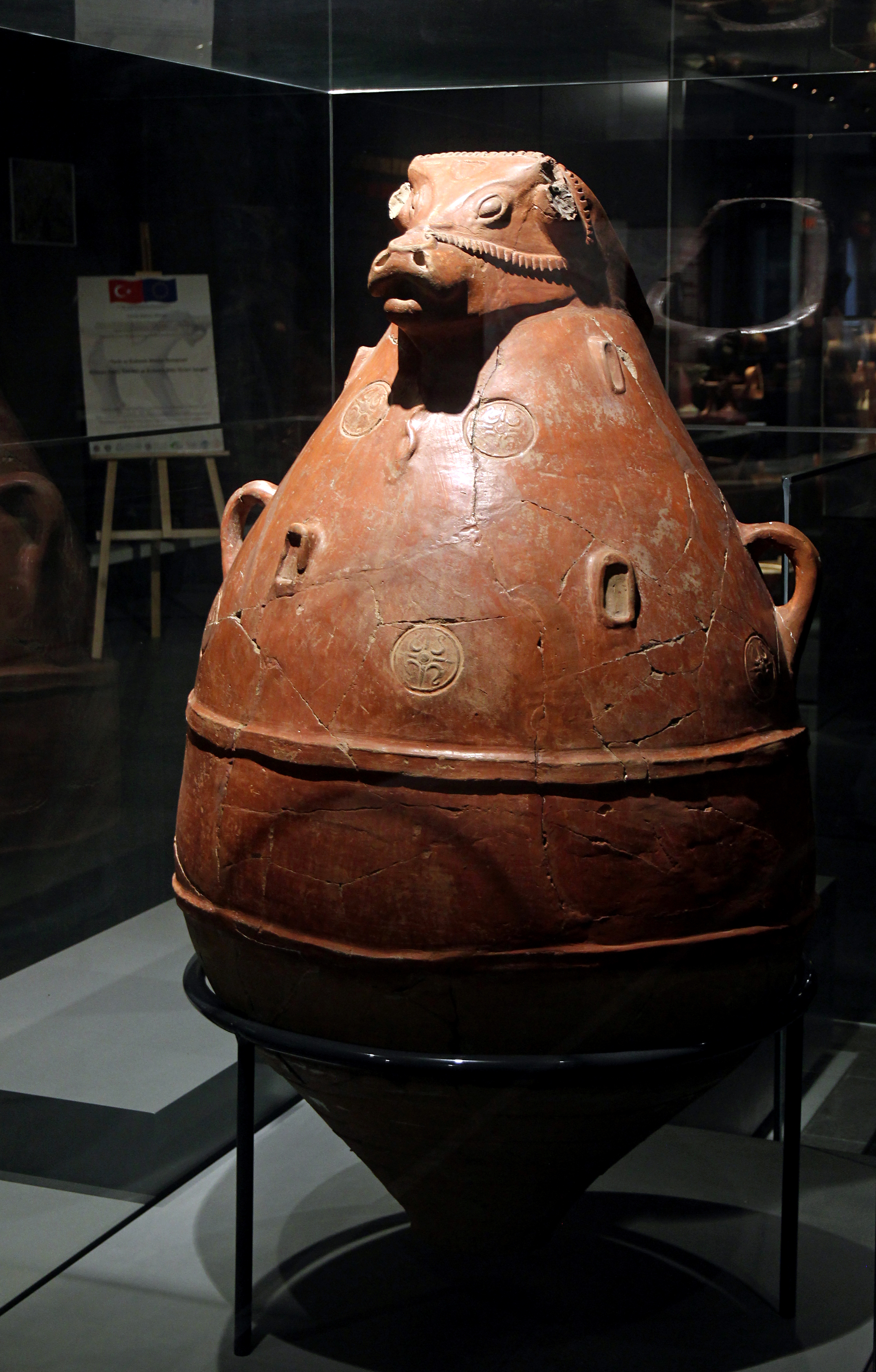
Terracotta vessel with stamped decoration from Kültepe, Kayseri Archaeology Museum

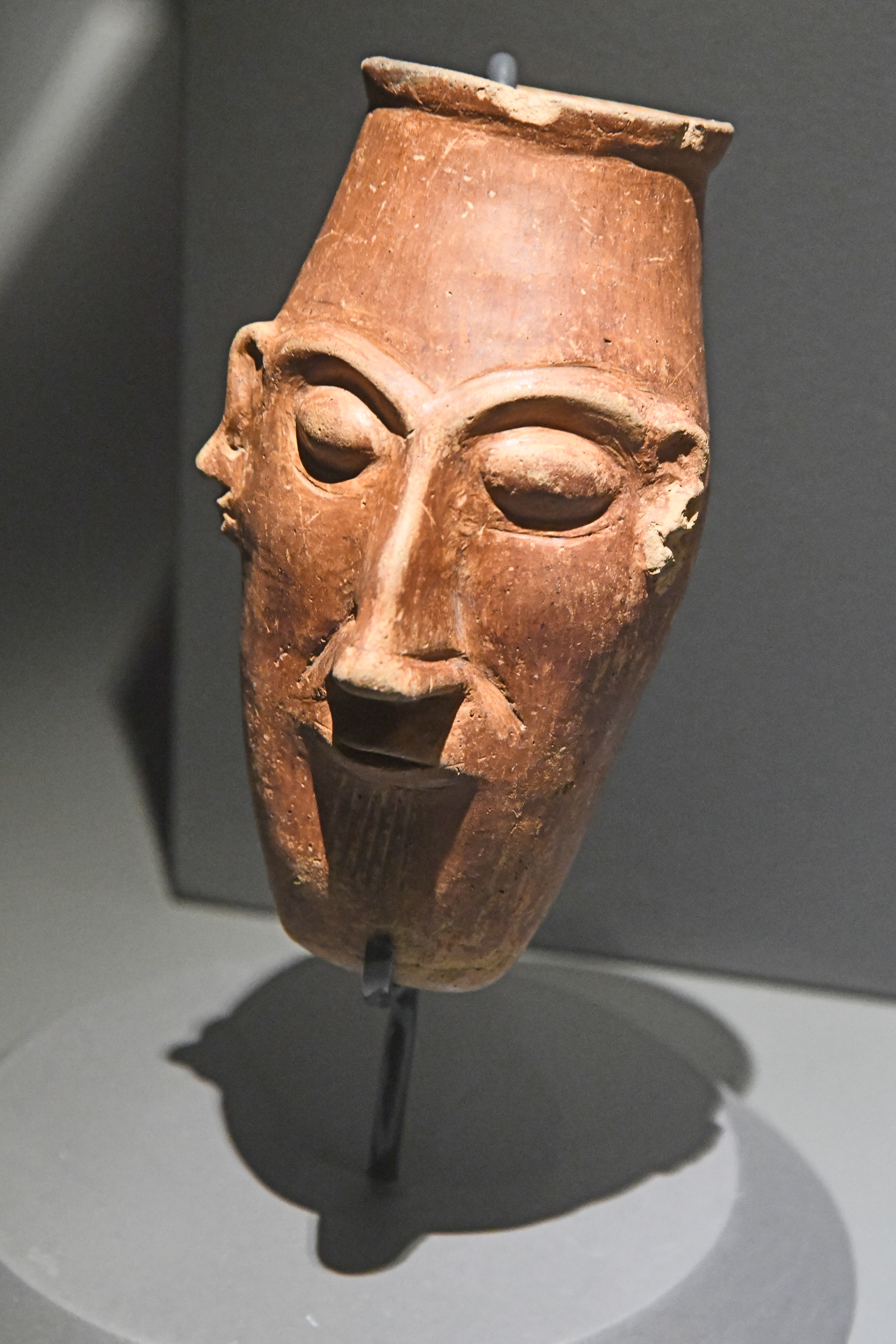
Human faced vessel Assyrian Trading Colonies Period 2000-1700 BC in Kayseri Archaeology Museum.

Kayseri experienced three golden ages. The first, dating to 2000 BC, was when the city formed a trade post between the Assyrians and the Hittites. The second came under Roman rule from the 1st to the 11th centuries. The third golden age was during the reign of the Seljuks (1178–1243), when the city was the second capital of the Seljuk Sultanate of Rum.

=== Ancient history ===
As Mazaca (Ancient Greek: Μάζακα), the city served as the residence of the kings of Cappadocia. In ancient times, it was on the crossroads of the trade routes from Sinope to the Euphrates and from the Persian Royal Road that extended from Sardis to Susa during the 200+ years of Achaemenid Persian rule. In Roman times, a similar route from Ephesus to the East also crossed the city.

In Late Antiquity, the city may have contained a population of around 50,000 inhabitants and it was the highest ranked diocese up to the council of Chalcedon. Nothing remains of it today. Basil of Caesarea, one of the Cappadocian Fathers, established a large complex containing charitable institutions, a monastery and churches, the Basiliad, in Caesarea Mazaca in the fourth century. Nothing remains of it today.

The city was also situated on the main pilgrimage route from Constantinople to the Holy Land and had several shrines dedicated to local saints, such as St Mamas, St Merkourious and Basil of Caesarea, which continued to be venerated by the local population into the 17th century. The city was occupied by the Sassanids in 611/12 in the last war between the Byzantines and the Sassanids and became the headquarter of emperor Heraclius.

The city stood on a low spur on the north side of Mount Erciyes (Mount Argaeus in antiquity). Very few traces of the ancient site now survive.

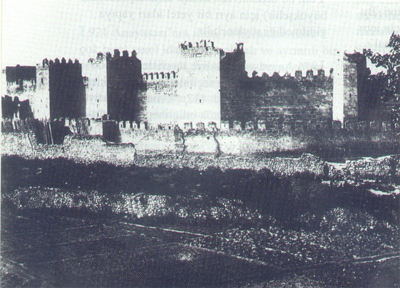
A photograph of Kayseri castle walls in 1897

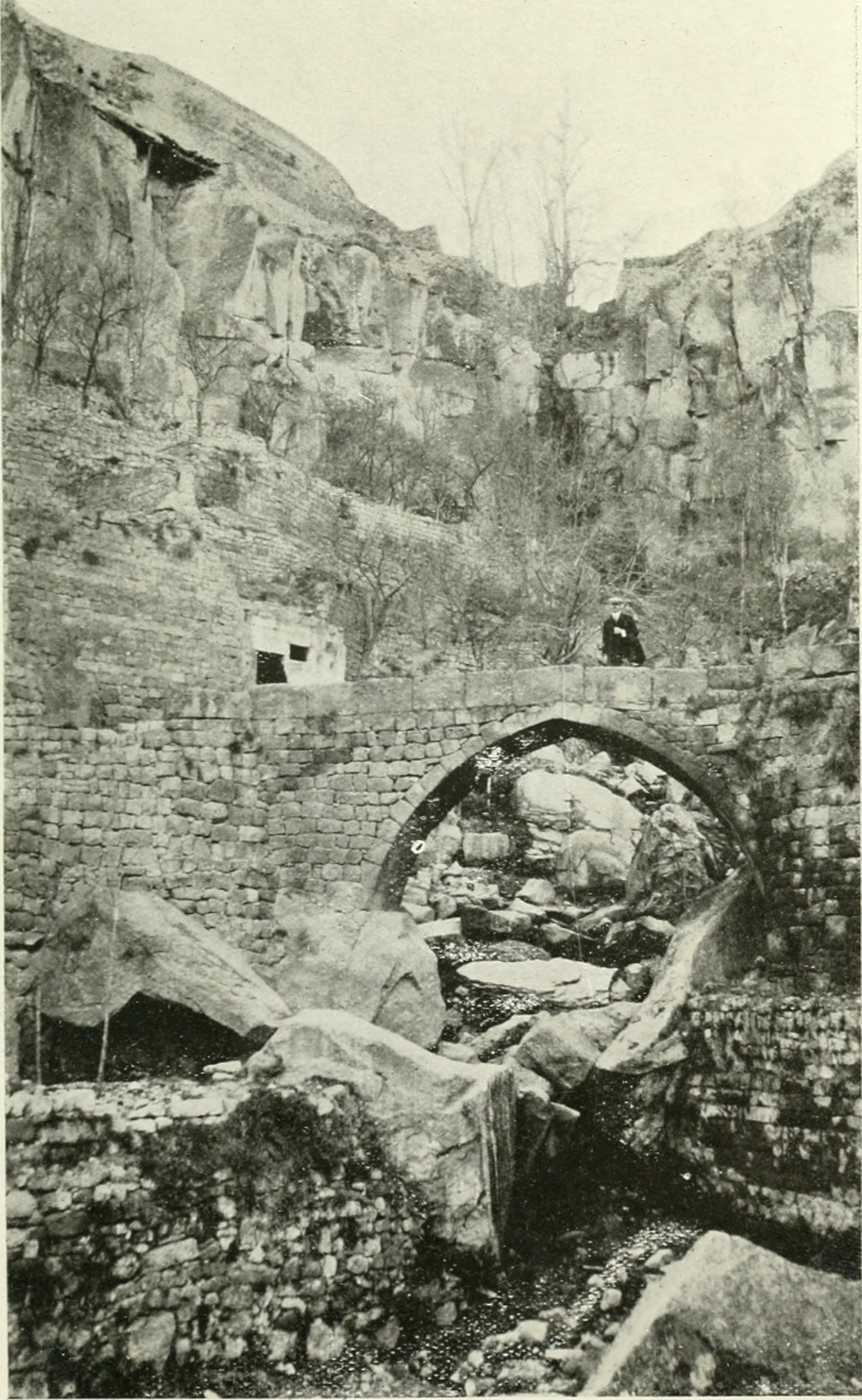
A Glen stone bridge in Talas, 1917

=== Medieval history ===
From the mid-seventh century onwards, Arab attacks on Cappadocia and Caesarea became common and the city was besieged several times, diminishing in population and resources consequently. The Arab general, and later the first Umayyad Caliph, Muawiyah invaded Cappadocia and took Caesarea from the Byzantines temporarily in 647. By the mid-eight century, the area between Caesarea and Melitene was a no-mans land.

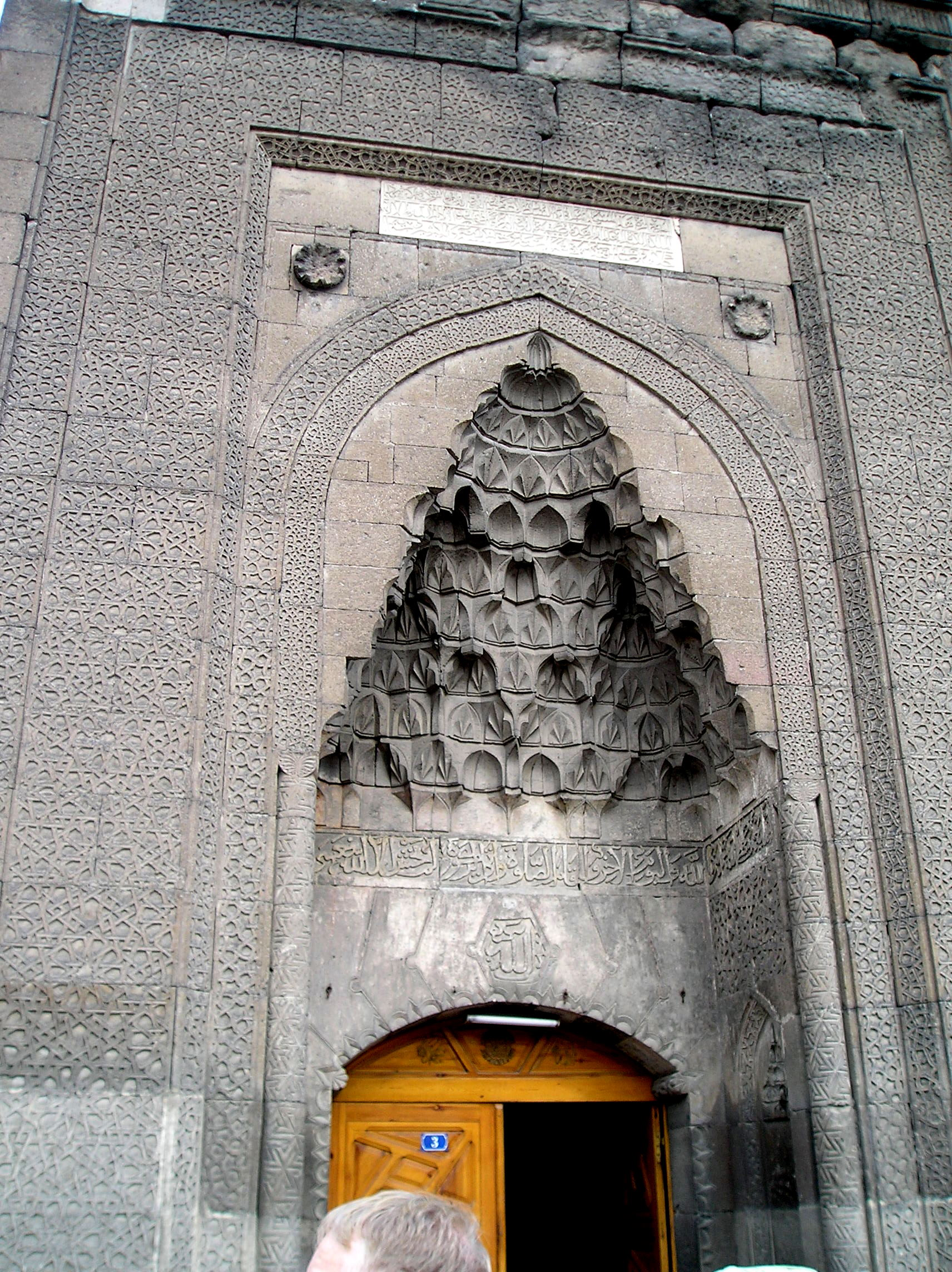
Detail from the Seljuk-era Hunat Hatun Mosque, built in 1238 for Sultana Hunat Hatun, wife of Seljuk Sultan Alaeddin Keykubad I and mother of Sultan Gıyaseddin Keyhüsrev II.

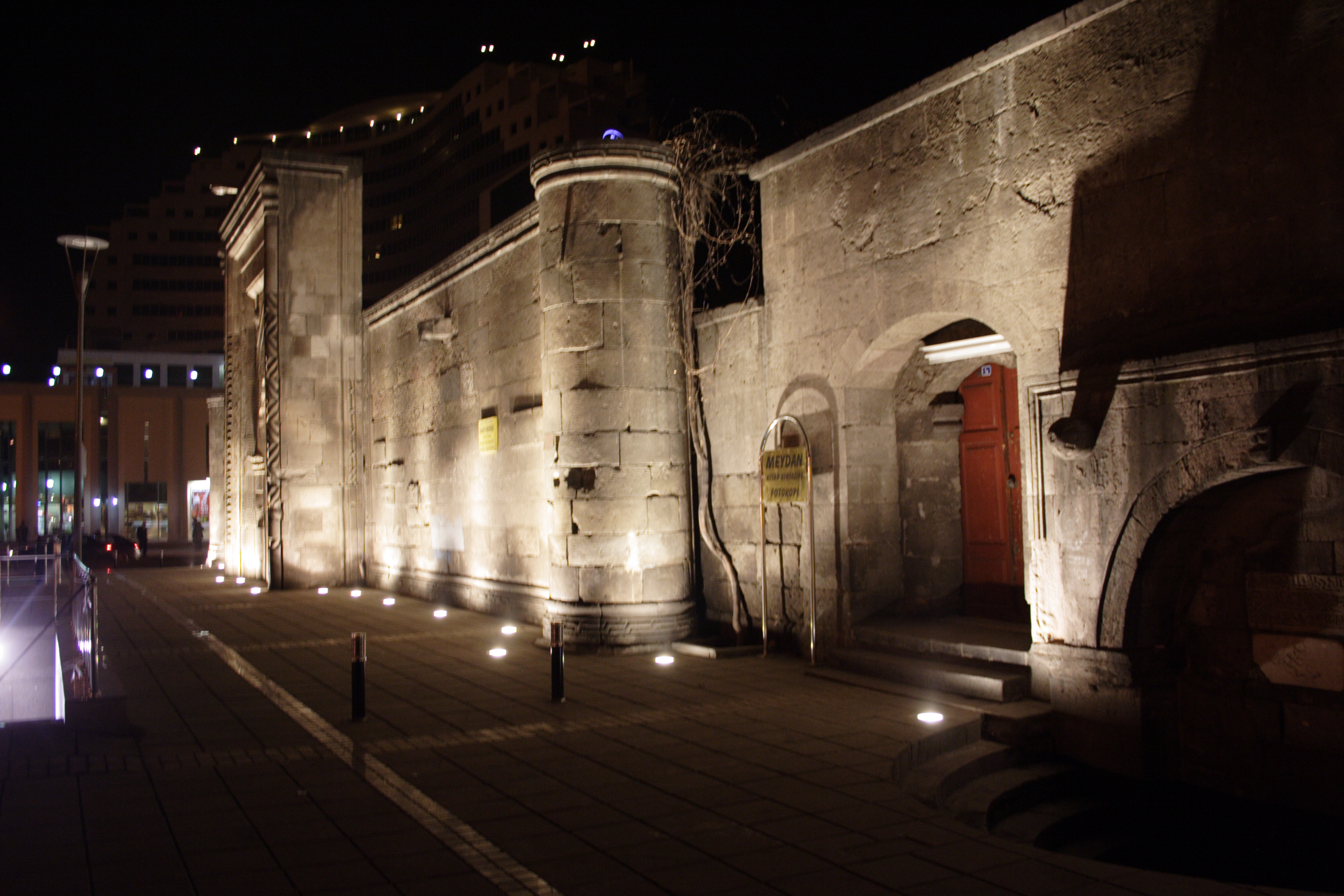
Walls of the Seljuk era Sahabiye Medresesi, built in 1267 by the Seljuk vizier Sahip Ata Fahreddin Ali.

Though the city lost most of its importance by the tenth century, it probably still housed around 50,000 people. Alp Arslan's forces demolished the city and massacred its population in 1067. The shrine of Saint Basil was also sacked after the fall of the city. As a result, the city remained uninhabited for the next half century.

From 1074 to 1178 the area was under the control of the Danishmendids who rebuilt the city in 1134. The Sultanate of Rum controlled the city from 1178 to 1243 and it was one of their most important centres until it fell to the Mongols in 1243. The relatively short Seljuk period left a large number of historic landmarks including the Hunat Hatun Complex, the Kiliç Arslan Mosque, the Ulu Camii (Grand Mosque) and the Gevher Nesibe Hastanesi (Hospital). Within the walls lies the greater part of Kayseri, rebuilt between the 13th and 16th centuries. Following his victory at the Battle of Elbistan against the Sultanate of Rum, in 1277 the Sultan Baybars marched into the city and massacred the Christians of Caesarea, but spared its Muslim inhabitants. The city fell to the Eretnids in the 14th century, before falling to the Ottomans in 1515. It was the centre of a sanjak called initially the Rûm Eyalet (1515–1521) and then the Angora vilayet (founded as Bozok Eyalet, 1839–1923).

=== Modern era ===
The Grand Bazaar dates from the latter part of the 1800s, but the adjacent caravanserai, where merchant traders gathered before forming a caravan, dates from around 1500. The town's older districts which were filled with ornate mansion-houses mostly dating from the 18th and 19th centuries were subjected to wholesale demolition starting in the 1970s.

The building that hosted the Kayseri Lyceum was rearranged to host the Turkish Grand National Assembly during the Turkish War of Independence when the Greek army was advancing on Ankara, the base of the Turkish National Movement.

== Geography ==
=== Climate ===
Kayseri has a humid continental climate (Köppen: Dsa, Trewartha: Dc). It experiences cold, snowy winters and hot, dry summers with cool nights. Precipitation occurs throughout the year, albeit with a marked decrease in late summer and early fall.

Climate data for Kayseri (1991–2020, extremes 1931–2023)
Month	Jan	Feb	Mar	Apr	May	Jun	Jul	Aug	Sep	Oct	Nov	Dec	Year
Record high °C (°F)	19.3 (66.7)	22.6 (72.7)	28.6 (83.5)	31.2 (88.2)	34.2 (93.6)	37.6 (99.7)	40.7 (105.3)	40.6 (105.1)	38.4 (101.1)	33.6 (92.5)	26.0 (78.8)	21.0 (69.8)	40.7 (105.3)
Mean daily maximum °C (°F)	4.6 (40.3)	6.6 (43.9)	12.2 (54.0)	17.9 (64.2)	22.7 (72.9)	27.4 (81.3)	31.3 (88.3)	31.4 (88.5)	27.1 (80.8)	20.8 (69.4)	12.9 (55.2)	6.5 (43.7)	18.4 (65.1)
Daily mean °C (°F)	−1.0 (30.2)	0.5 (32.9)	5.6 (42.1)	10.7 (51.3)	15.1 (59.2)	19.3 (66.7)	22.7 (72.9)	22.6 (72.7)	18.0 (64.4)	12.4 (54.3)	5.4 (41.7)	0.8 (33.4)	11.0 (51.8)
Mean daily minimum °C (°F)	−5.4 (22.3)	−4.5 (23.9)	−0.1 (31.8)	3.9 (39.0)	7.6 (45.7)	11.0 (51.8)	13.5 (56.3)	13.3 (55.9)	9.0 (48.2)	4.9 (40.8)	−0.5 (31.1)	−3.6 (25.5)	4.1 (39.4)
Record low °C (°F)	−32.5 (−26.5)	−31.2 (−24.2)	−28.1 (−18.6)	−11.6 (11.1)	−6.9 (19.6)	−0.6 (30.9)	2.9 (37.2)	1.4 (34.5)	−3.8 (25.2)	−12.2 (10.0)	−20.7 (−5.3)	−28.4 (−19.1)	−32.5 (−26.5)
Average precipitation mm (inches)	38.0 (1.50)	38.9 (1.53)	49.6 (1.95)	46.9 (1.85)	57.9 (2.28)	40.6 (1.60)	11.9 (0.47)	9.5 (0.37)	14.0 (0.55)	32.3 (1.27)	29.3 (1.15)	39.3 (1.55)	408.2 (16.07)
Average precipitation days	11.6	11.5	12.67	12.13	13.27	9.43	2.17	1.77	3.87	7.67	7.73	11.17	104.98
Average relative humidity (%)	75.9	71.5	64.3	58.9	58.9	54.5	46.6	46.7	50.5	61.6	68.1	75.3	61.0
Mean monthly sunshine hours	89.9	113.0	145.7	183.0	248.0	300.0	356.5	341.0	255.0	195.3	141.0	83.7	2,452.1
Mean daily sunshine hours	2.9	4.0	4.7	6.1	8.0	10.0	11.5	11.0	8.5	6.3	4.7	2.7	6.7
Source 1: Turkish State Meteorological Service
Source 2: NOAA (humidity, 1991–2020)

== Districts ==
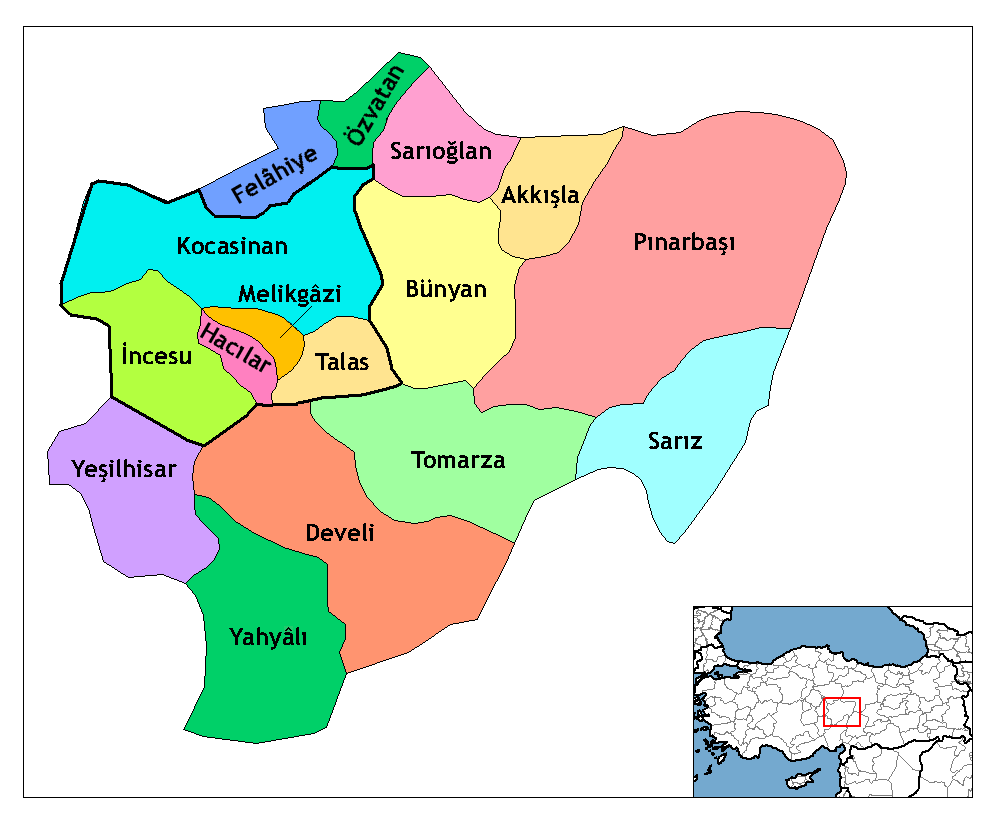
Metropolitan districts of Kayseri

The city of Kayseri consists of sixteen metropolitan districts: Akkışla, Bünyan, Develi, Felâhiye, Hacılar, İncesu, Kocasinan, Melikgâzi, Özvatan, Pınarbaşı, Sarıoğlan, Sarız, Talas, Tomarza, Yahyâlı, and Yeşilhisar.

== Notable sites ==
=== In Kayseri ===
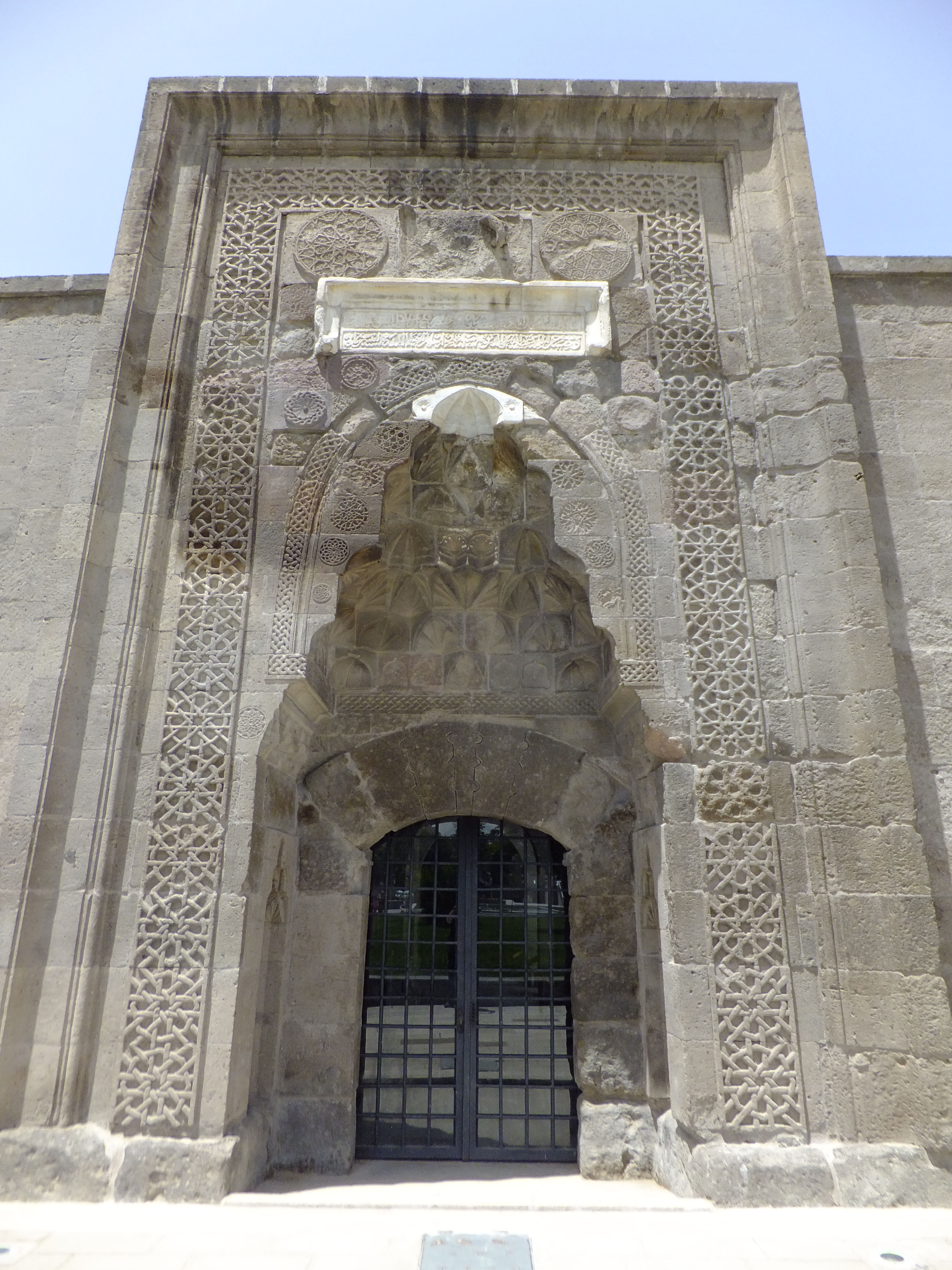
Gevher Nesibe Medrese (Çifte Medrese) is a historical twin-medrese complex located in Kayseri.

Cumhuriyet Square is a central public space in Kayseri, surrounded by notable buildings. Inside the centre of Kayseri the most unmissable reminder of the past are the huge basalt walls that once enclosed the old city. Dating back to the sixth century and the reign of the Emperor Justinian, they have been repeatedly repaired, by the Seljuks, by the Ottomans and by the Turkish government. In 2019 Kayseri Archaeology Museum moved from an outlying location to a new site inside the walls.

The Grand Mosque (Turkish: Ulu Cami) was started by the Danişmend emir Melik Mehmed Gazi who is buried beside it; it was completed by the Seljuks after his death. The oldest surviving Seljuk place of worship and the oldest Seljuk mosque built in Turkey is the Hunat Hatun Mosque Complex which includes a functioning hamam with separate sections for men and women dating back to 1238.

Near the mosque is the Sahabiye Medresesi, a theological school dating back to 1267 with a portal typical of Seljuk architecture. In Mimar Sinan Park stands the Çifte Medresesi, a pair of Seljuk-era theological schools that eventually served as a hospital for those with psychiatric disorders. They were commissioned by the Seljuk sultan Giyasettin I Keyhüsrev and his sister, Gevher Nesibe Sultan, who is buried inside. The buildings house the Museum of Seljuk Civilisations.

The Seljuk Halikılıç Mosque complex has two entrance portals. It dates back to 1249 and was extensively restored three centuries later. The Güpgüpoğlu Mansion which dates back to the early 15th century is a museum with the furnishings it would have had in the late 19th century when it was home to the poet and politician Ahmed Midhad Güpgüpoğlu.

Close to the walls is Kayseri's own Kapalı Çarşı (Turkish: Kapalı Çarşı), a commercial centre. Inside it is the older Vezir Han which was commissioned in the early 18th century Damad İbrahim Paşa who was a grand vizier to Sultan Ahmed III before being assassinated in 1730.

=== Around Kayseri ===
The Kayseri suburb of Talas was the ancestral home of Calouste Gulbenkian, Aristotle Onassis and Elia Kazan. Once ruinous following the expulsion of its Armenian population in 1915 and then of its Greek population in 1923, it was largely reconstructed in the early 21st century. The Greek Orthodox Church of Saint Mary, built in 1888, has been converted into the Yaman Dede Mosque. Similarly attractive is the suburb of Germir, home to three 19th-century churches and many fine old stone houses.

Mount Erciyes (Turkish: Erciyes Dağı) looms over Kayseri and serves as a trekking and alpinism centre. During the 2010s an erstwhile small, local ski resort was developed into more of an international attraction with big-name hotels and facilities suitable for all sorts of winter pastimes.

The archaeological site of Kanesh-Kültepe, one of the oldest cities in Asia Minor, is 20 km northeast of Kayseri.

Ağırnas, a small town with many lovely old houses, was the birthplace in 1490 of the great Ottoman architect Mimar Sinan, and a house traditionally associated with him is open to the public as a museum. Beneath it there is one of the 'underground cities' so typical of Cappadocia. The restored Church of Saint Procopius dates back to 1857 and serves as a cultural centre.

The small town of Develi also contains some attractive old houses. The 19th-century Armenian Church of Saint Mary has been turned into the Lower Everek Mosque (Turkish: Aşağı Everek Cami).

== Economy ==
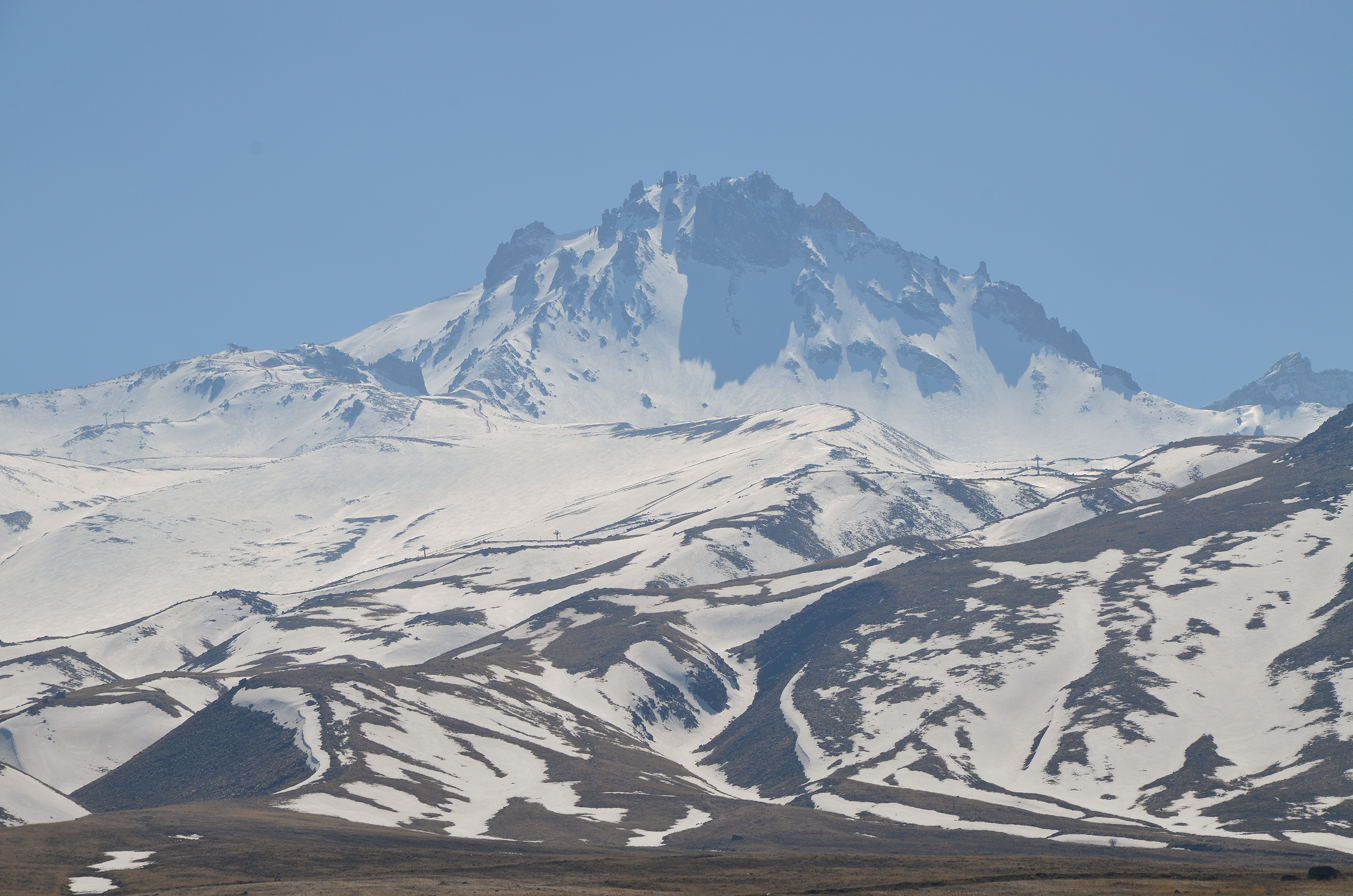
Nearby Mount Erciyes is a popular destination for winter sports.

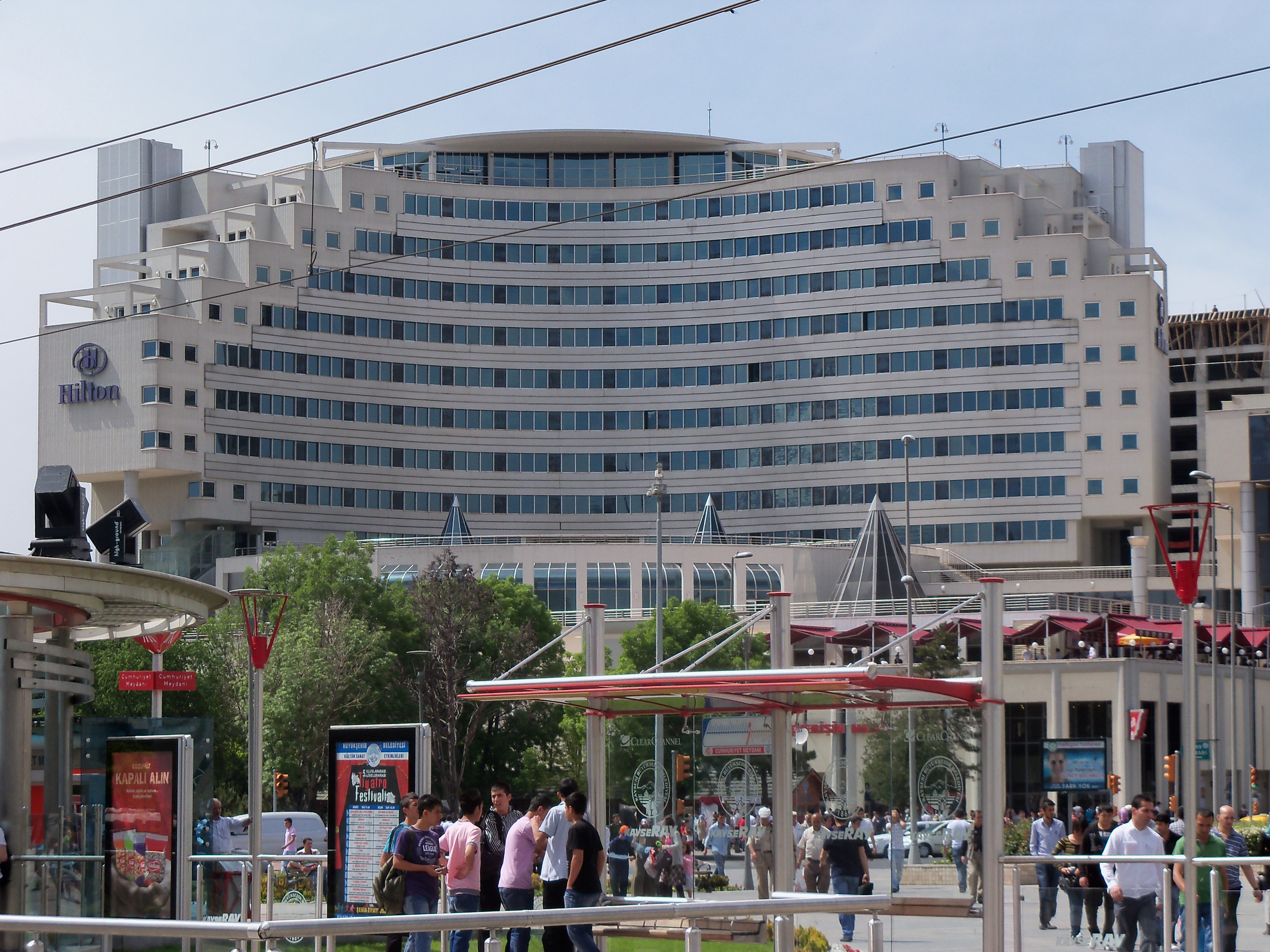
Wyndham Hotels & Resorts Kayseri in the city centre.

Kayseri received notable public investments in the 1920s and 1930s. Sümer Fabric Factory and Kayseri Tayyare Fabrikası (English: Kayseri Aeroplane Factory) were set up here in the Republican Era with the help of German and particularly Russian experts. The latter manufactured the first aircraft made in Turkey in the 1940s. After the 1950s, the city suffered from a decrease in the amount of public investment. It was, however, during the same years that Kayseri businessmen and merchants transformed themselves into rural capitalists. Members of Turkish business families such as Sabancı, Has, Dedeman, Hattat, Kurmel, Özyeğin and Özilhan started out as small-scale merchants in Kayseri before becoming prominent actors in the Turkish economy. Despite setting up their headquarters in cities such as Istanbul and Adana, they often returned to Kayseri to invest.

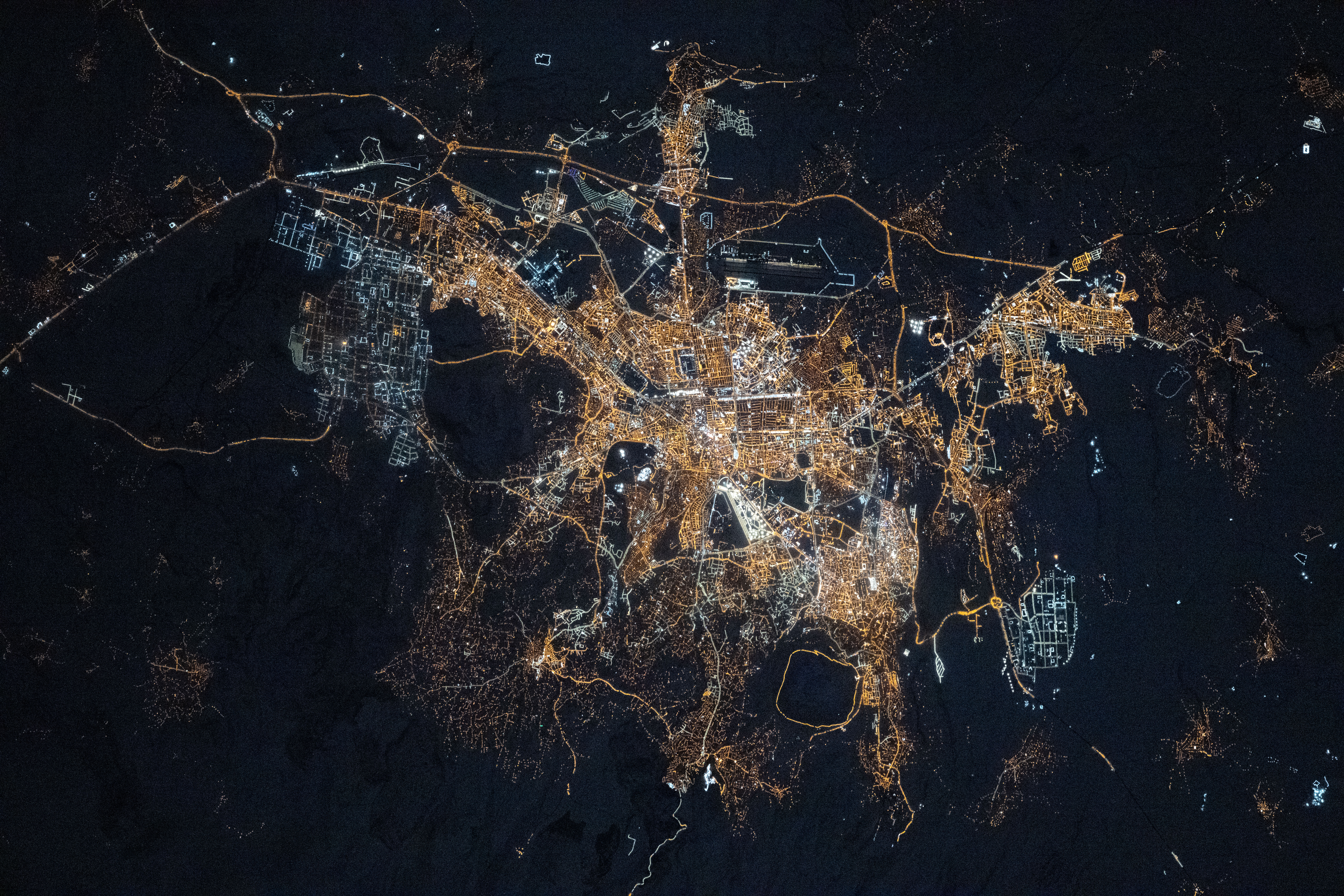
A satellite view of Kayseri at night

Thanks to the economic liberalisation policies introduced in the 1980s, a new wave of merchants and industrialists from Kayseri joined their predecessors. Most of these new industrialists choose Kayseri as a base of their operations. As a consequence of better infrastructure, the city has achieved remarkable industrial growth since 2000, causing it to be described as one of Turkey's Anatolian Tigers.

The pace of growth of the city was so fast that in 2004 the city applied to the Guinness Book of World Records for the most new manufacturing industries started in a single day: 139 factories. Kayseri also has emerged as one of the most successful furniture-making hub in Turkey earned more than a billion dollars in export revenues in 2007. Its environment is regarded as especially favourable for small and medium enterprises.

Kayseri Free Zone established in 1998 now has more than 43 companies with an investment of 140 million dollars. The Zone's main business activities include production, trading, warehouse management, mounting and demounting, assembly-disassembly, merchandising, maintenance and repair, engineering workshops, office and workplace rental, packing-repacking, banking and insurance, leasing, labelling and exhibition facilities. Kayseri FTZ is one of the cheapest land free zones in the world.

A group of social scientists have examined the economic development of Kayseri, through the framework of a modernist Islamic outlook often referred to as "Islamic Calvinism." The term draws on Max Weber's 1905 essay The Protestant Ethic and the Spirit of Capitalism, which argued that the "this-worldly asceticism" of Calvinist ethics contributed to the emergence of modern capitalism. In a similar conceptual approach, scholars studying Kayseri have suggested that certain religious and cultural practices in the city encourage values such as disciplined work habits, thrift, and entrepreneurship, which they associate with local economic growth.

An op-ed in The Irish Times reported that luxury consumption appears relatively restrained and that financial resources are often directed toward long-term investment rather than visible expenditure. The piece described Kayseri's more affluent areas as comparatively modest by European standards and noted that reinvestment in the local community is common. Philanthropy constitutes another important component of local civic life. The city is known for privately funded schools, clinics, sports facilities, and community centers, which observers associate with longstanding traditions of charitable giving in Islamic practice and with broader patterns of community-based development.

== Transport ==
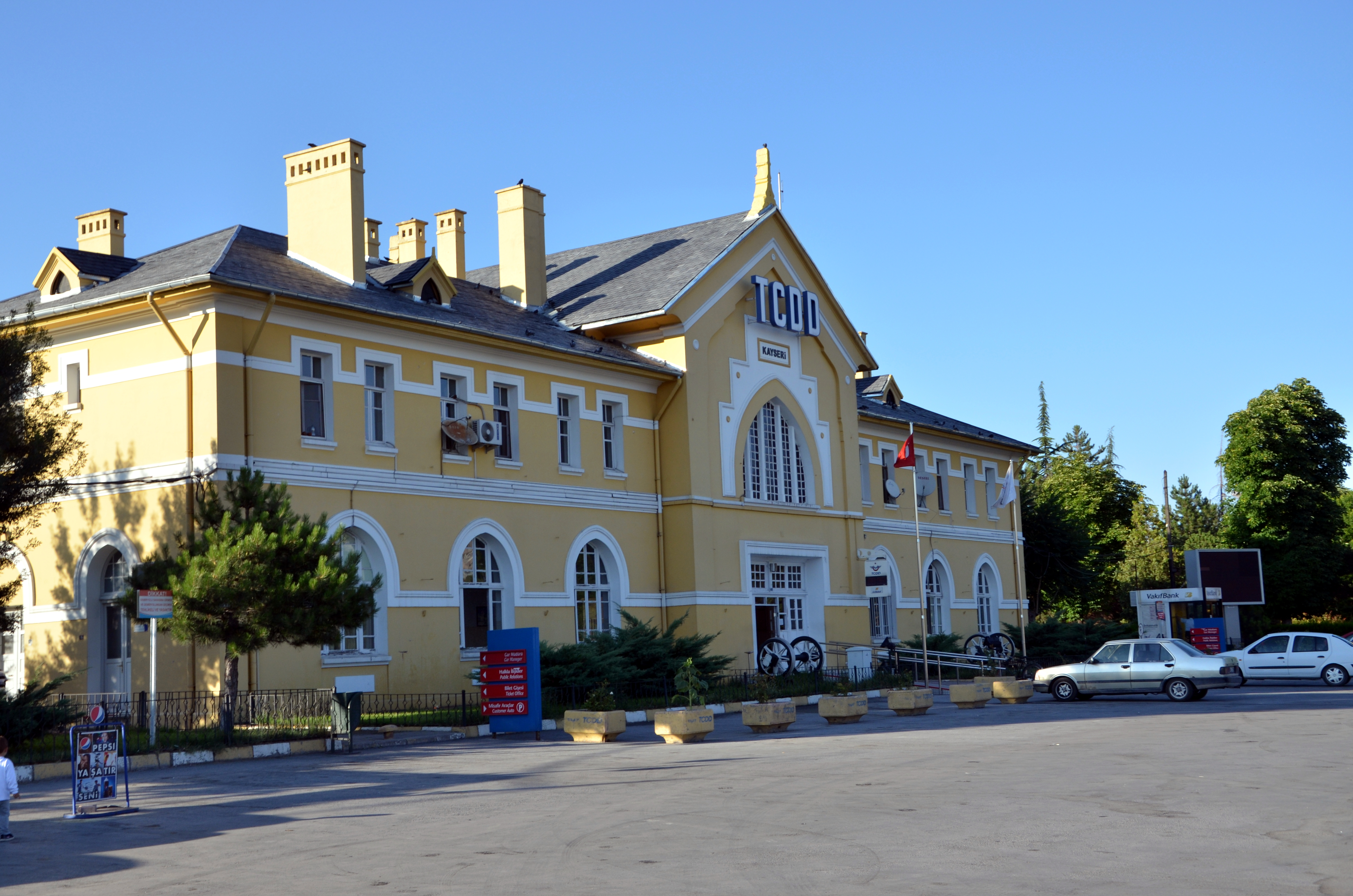
Kayseri Train Station

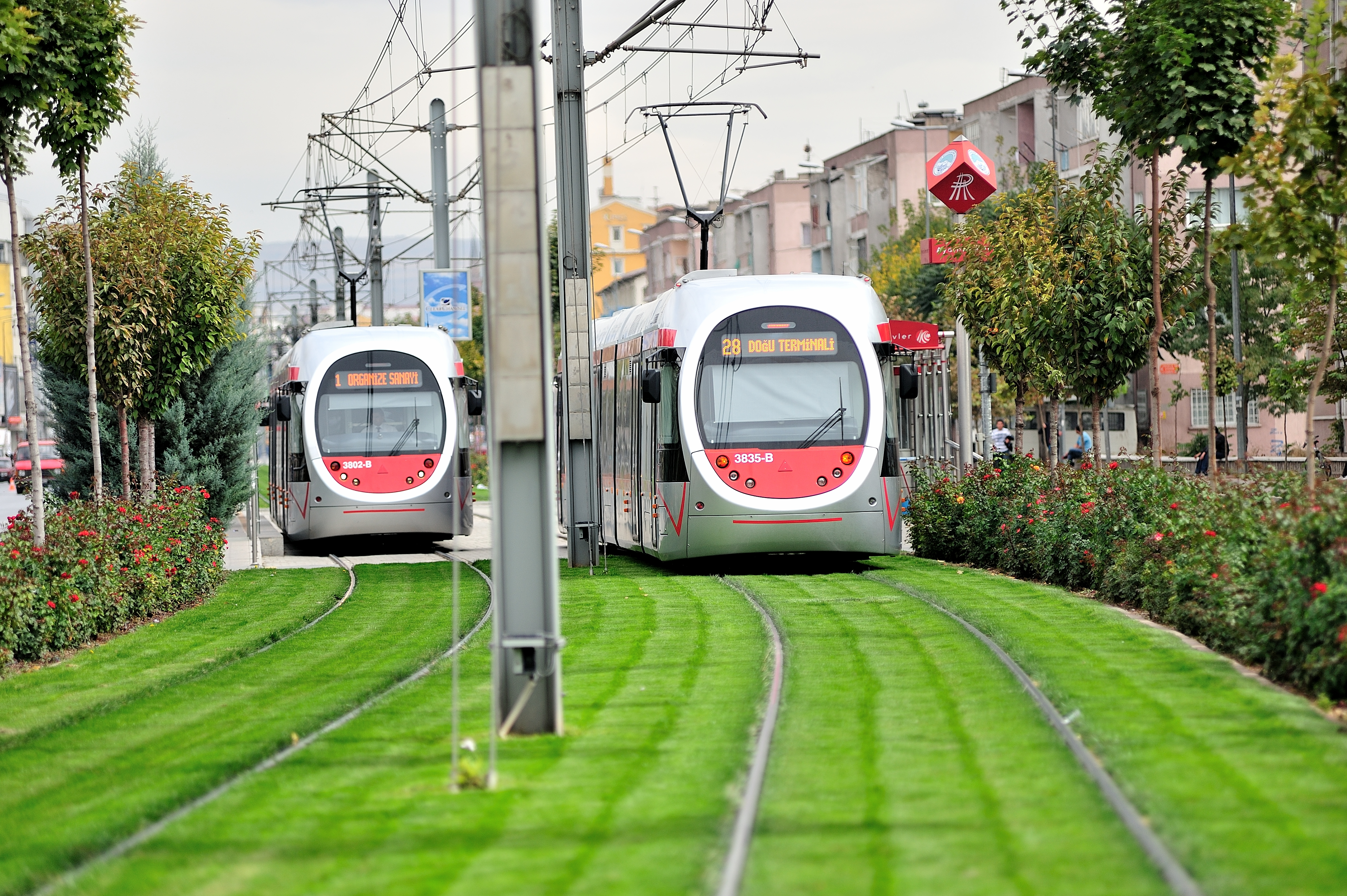
Kayseray LRT

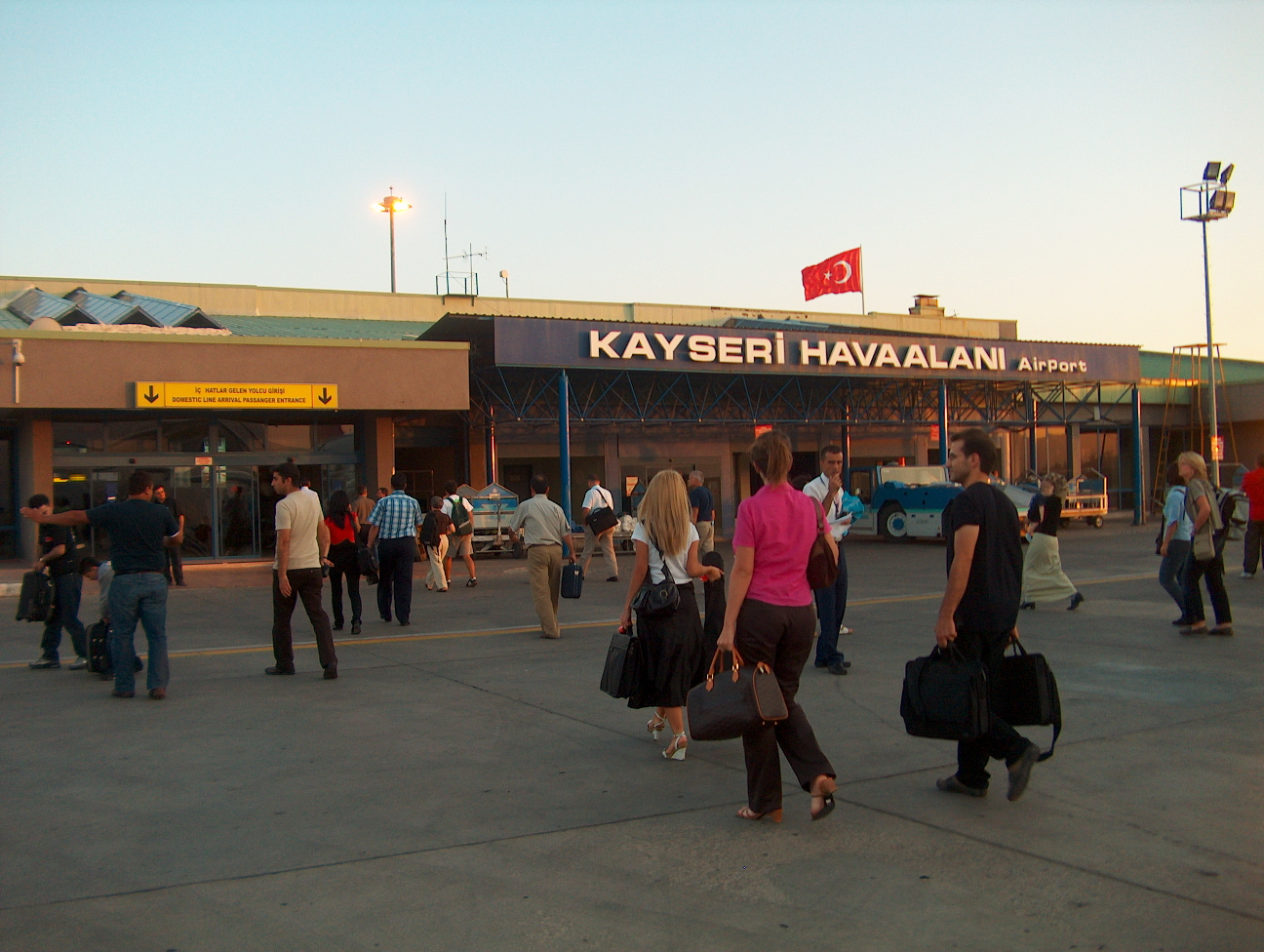
Erkilet International Airport

The city is served by Erkilet International Airport (ASR) which is a short distance from the centre of Kayseri. It offers several flights a day to Istanbul.

Kayseri is connected to the rest of country by rail services. There are four trains a day to Ankara. To the east there are two train routes, one to Kars and the other to Tatvan at the western end of Lake Van.

As the city is located in central Turkey, road transportation is very efficient. It takes approximately three hours to reach Ankara, the same to the Mediterranean coast and 45 minutes to Cappadocia. A notable ski resort in winter and accessible for trekking in summer, Mt Erciyes is 30 minutes from the city centre.

Within the city transportation largely relies on buses and private vehicles although there is also a light rail transit (LRT) system called Kayseray which runs to the inter-city bus terminal and to Talas.

== Sports ==
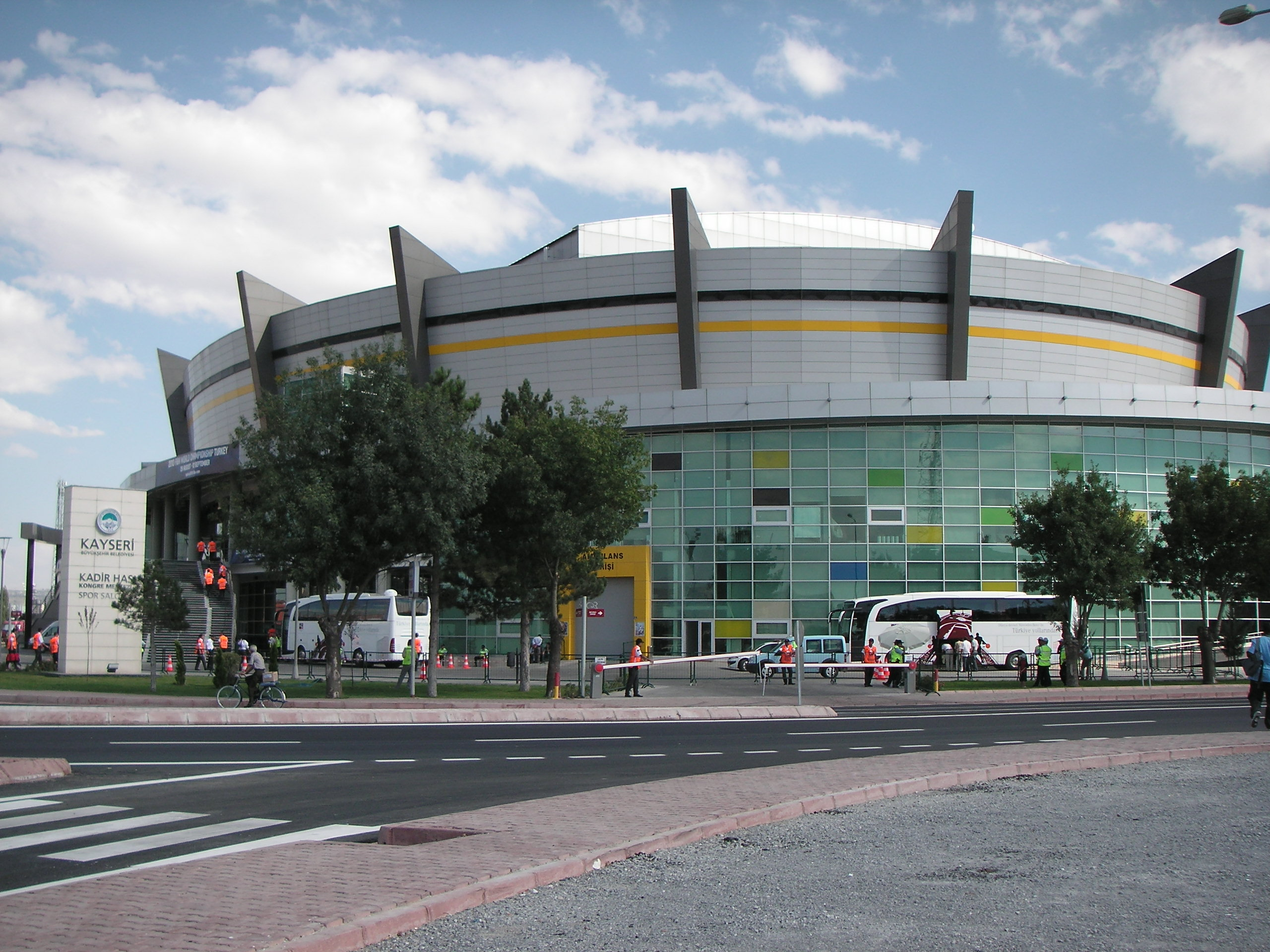
Kadir Has Sports Arena

The city had two professional football teams competing in top-flight Turkish football. Kayserispor and Kayseri Erciyesspor simultaneously play in the Süper Lig, making Kayseri one of only two cities having more than one team in Spor Toto Süper Lig 2013–14 (the other being Istanbul). In 2006 Kayserispor became the only Turkish team to have won the UEFA Intertoto Cup. Kayserispor is the remaining professional team in the city, playing in the top flight as of 2023.

The Erciyes Ski Resort on Mount Erciyes is one of the largest ski resorts in Turkey.

The women's football club Kayseri Gençler Birliği was promoted to the Women's First League for the 2020–21 League season.

=== Sports venues ===
- Kadir Has Stadium is a new generation stadium located in the outskirts of the city. Completed in early 2009, the all-seater stadium has a capacity of 33,000 spectators and is totally covered. It is shared by the two Kayseri football clubs. The stadium and surrounding sports complex are served by the light-rail system, Kayseray. The stadium was inaugurated with a Kayserispor – Fenerbahce league match. Kadir Has Stadium was one of eight host stadiums for the 2013 FIFA U-20 World Cup. It hosted the opening ceremony and the opening match between Cuba and the Republic of Korea. The stadium is named after Kayseri-native Kadir Has, a Turkish industrialist and the founder of Has Holding and Kadir Has University.
- Kadir Has Sports Arena is an indoor arena opened in 2008. It has seating capacity for 7,200 people. Together with Kadir Has Stadium, it is a part of the Kayseri Kadir Has Sports Complex, one of Turkey's most modern sports complexes. It was one of the venues for the 2010 FIBA World Championship.

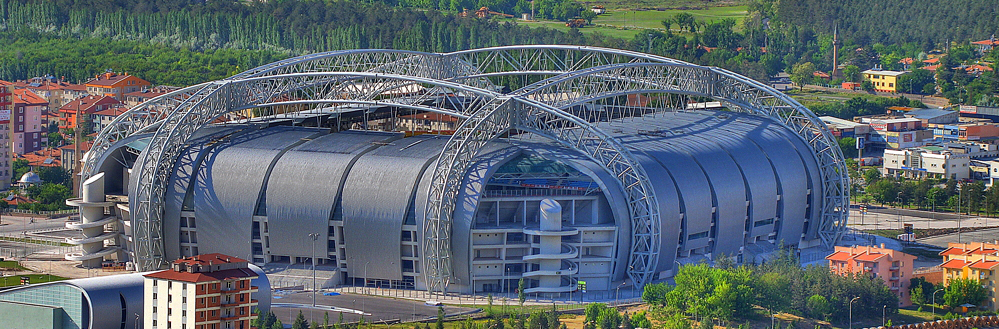
Kadir Has Stadium in Kayseri

== Education ==
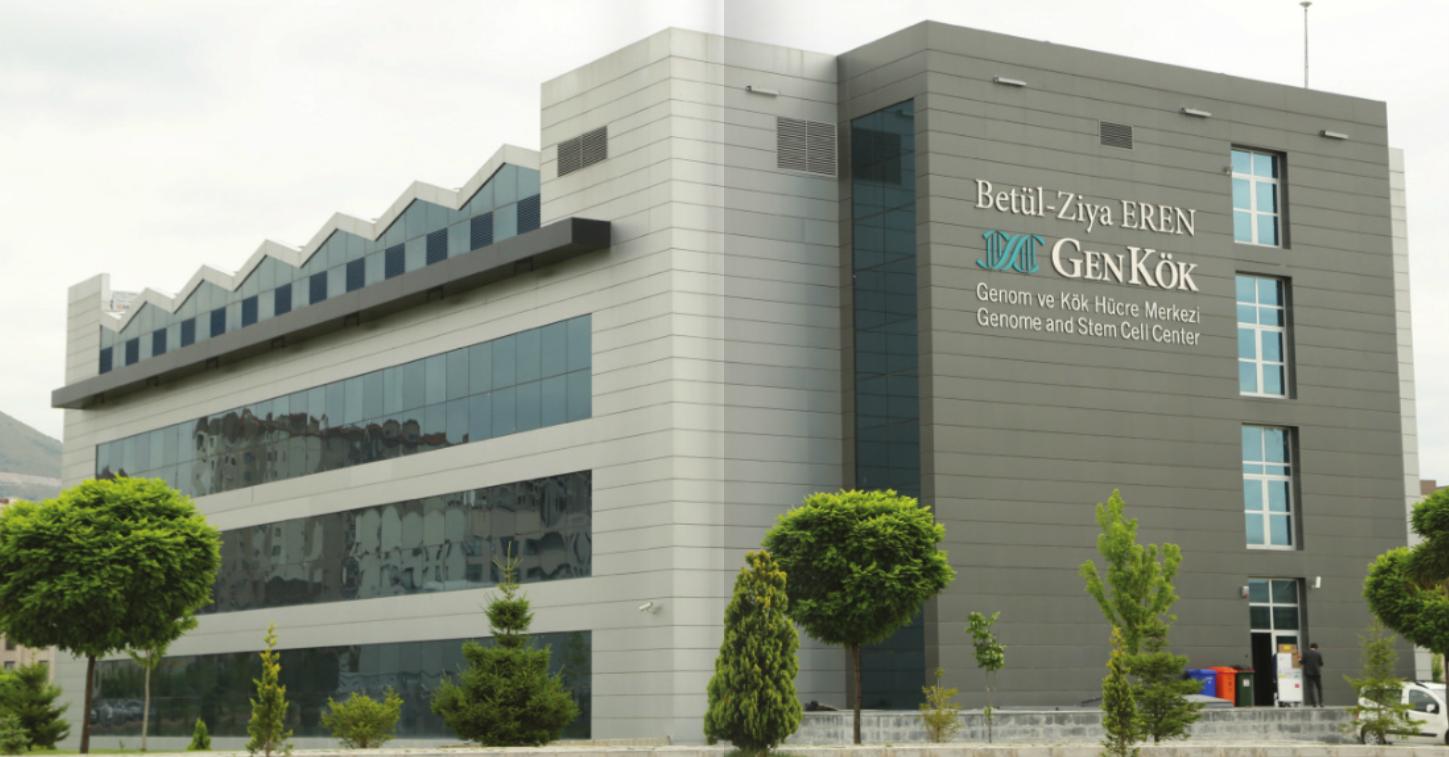
Erciyes University Betül-Ziya Eren Genome and Stem Cell Research Center

Kayseri High School (Ottoman Turkish: Kayseri Mekteb-i Sultanisi) was founded in 1893 and is among the oldest secondary schools in Turkey. Nuh Mehmet Küçükçalık Anatolian High School, established in 1984, provides instruction in English. TED Kayseri College, founded in 1966, is a private school located in the Kocasinan district and serves students from kindergarten to high school. Middle East Technical University Development Foundation Kayseri College was established in 1999. Talas American College, established in 1889, operated as an American boarding school for many decades.

Kayseri is home to four public universities and one private university. Abdullah Gül University, established in 2010, is the first public university in Turkey with legal provisions enabling support from a philanthropic foundation dedicated to its activities. Erciyes University, founded in 1978, is the city’s largest higher education institution, comprising 13 faculties, six colleges, and seven vocational schools, with more than 3,100 staff members and 41,225 students. Nuh Naci Yazgan University, founded in 2009, is the region’s only private university. Kayseri University, established after the separation of certain academic units from Erciyes University. University of Health Sciences Kayseri Medical School provides medical training and conducts research in the health sciences.

== Image gallery ==
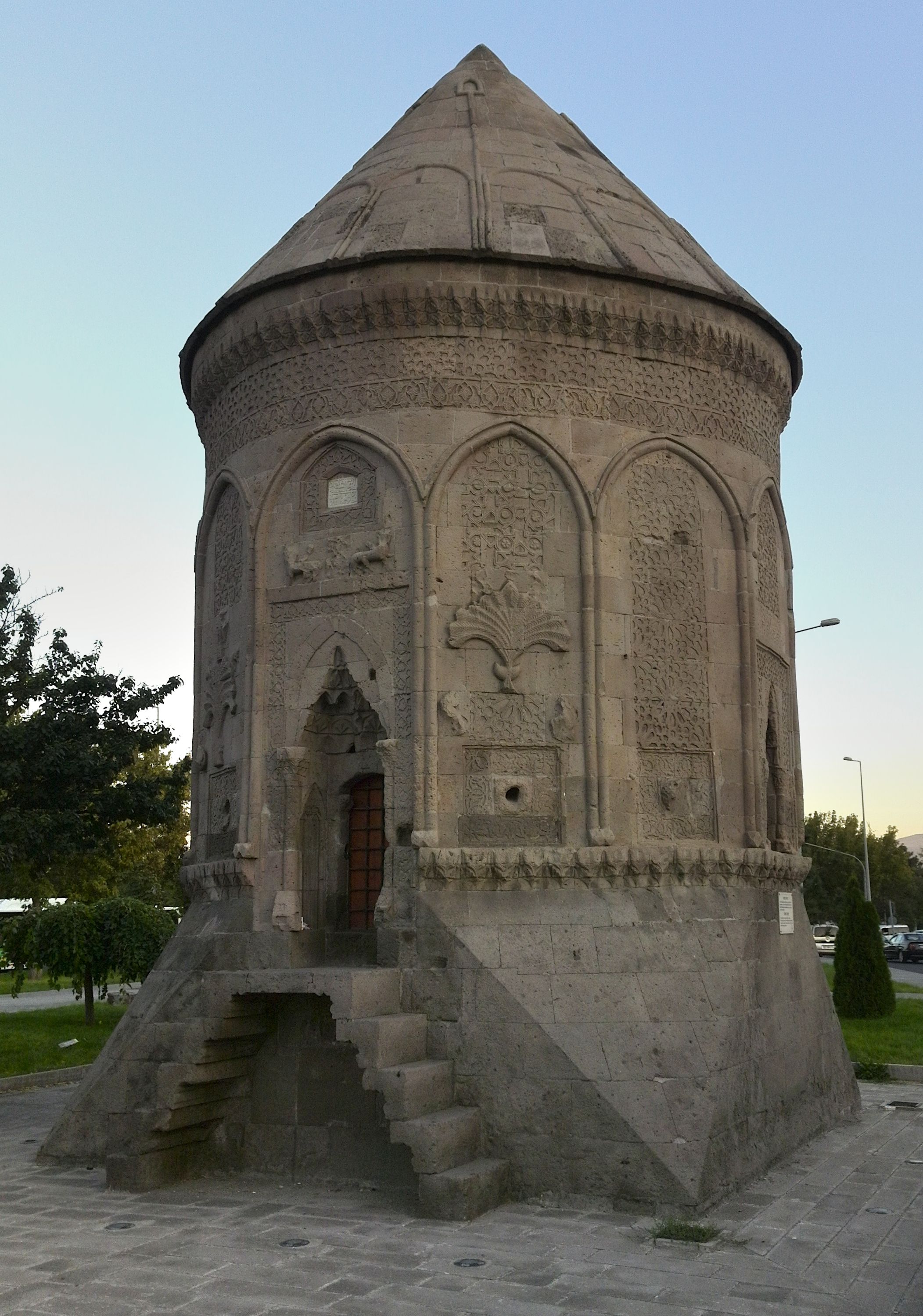
Döner Kümbet, a 13th-century Seljuk tomb, notable for its octagonal shape and intricate stone carvings.

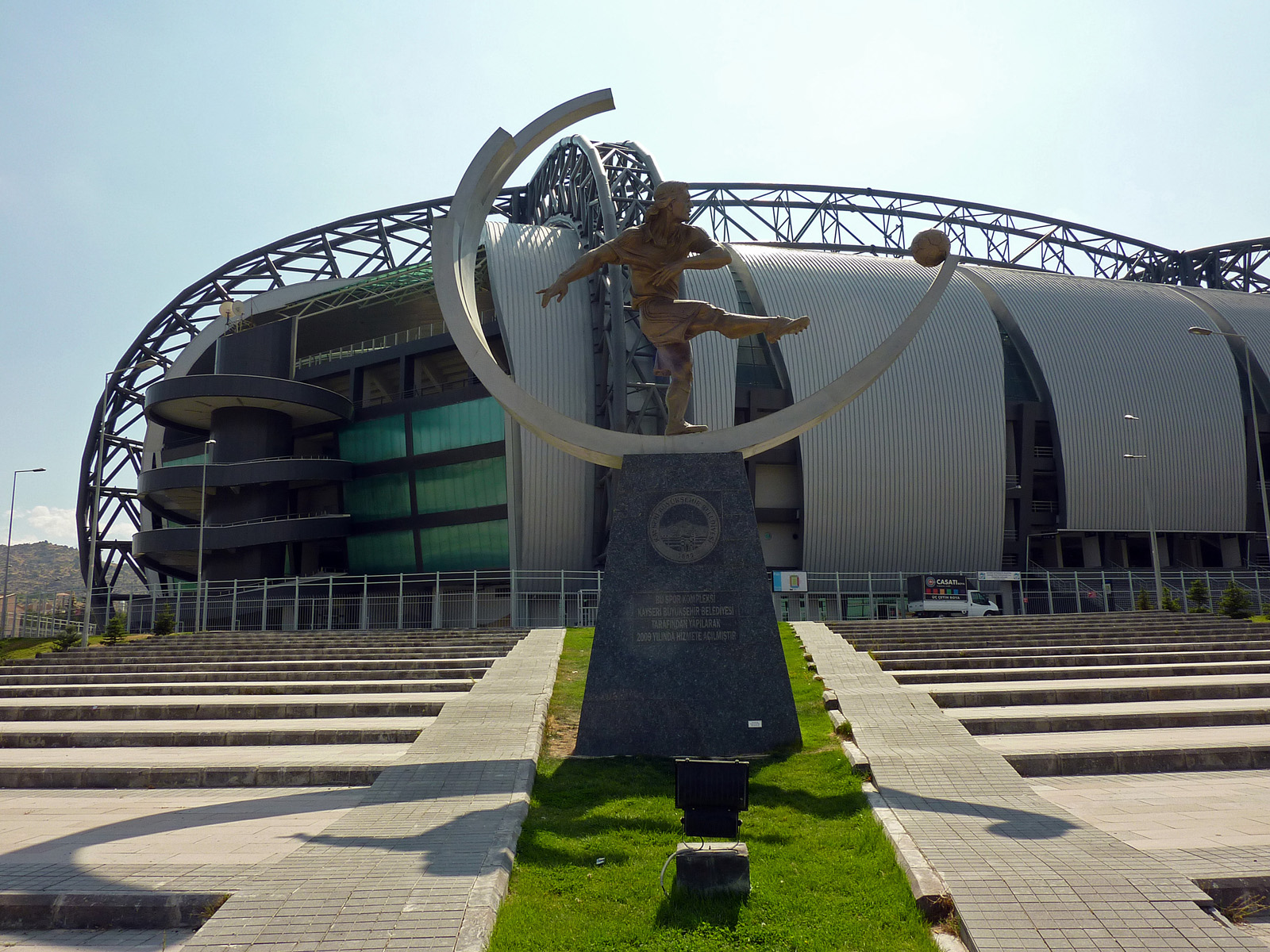
Kadir Has Stadium, a football stadium in Kayseri.

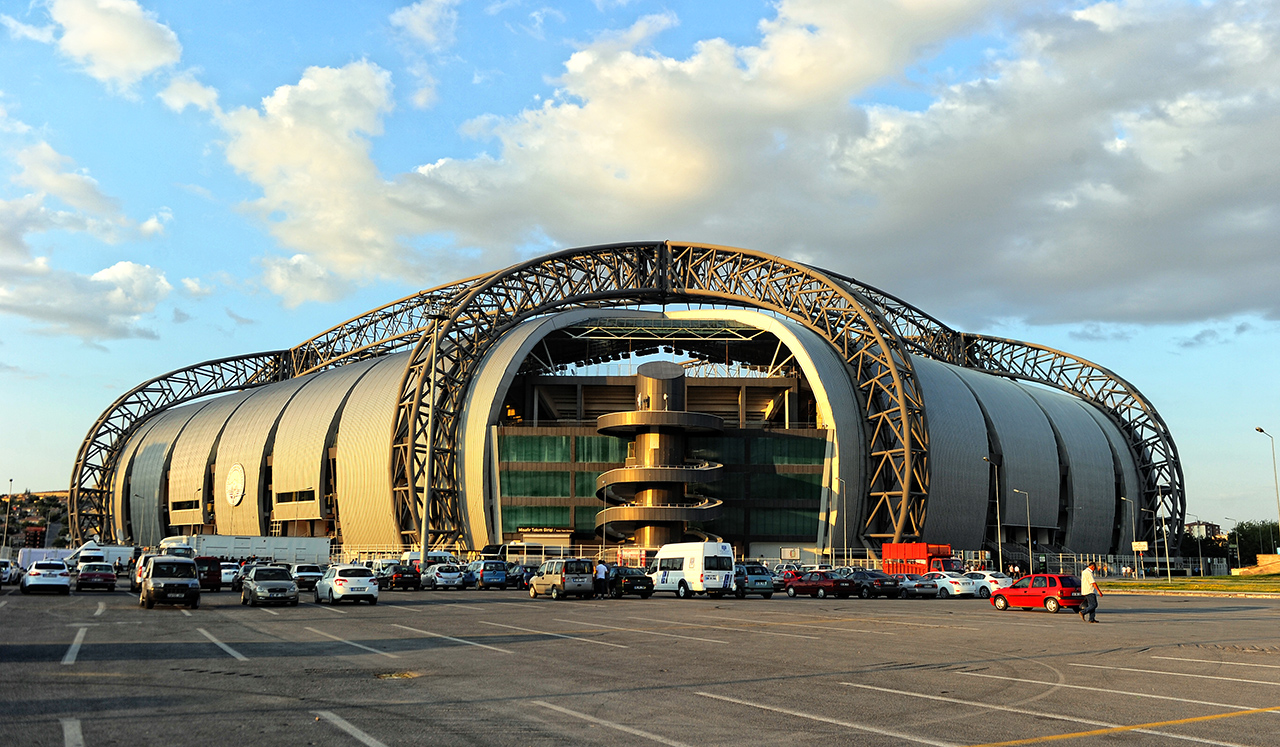
Kadir Has Stadium, a football stadium in Kayseri.

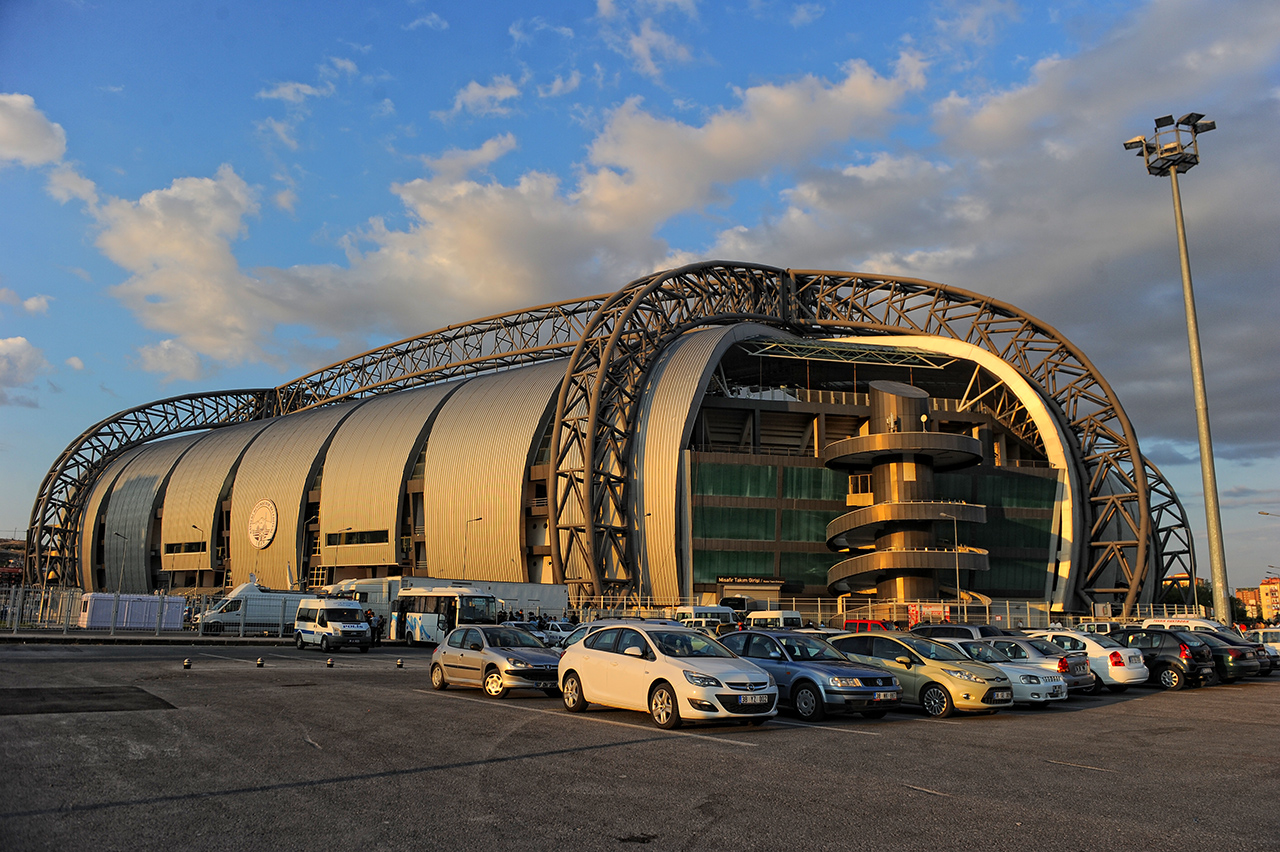
Kadir Has Stadium, a football stadium in Kayseri.

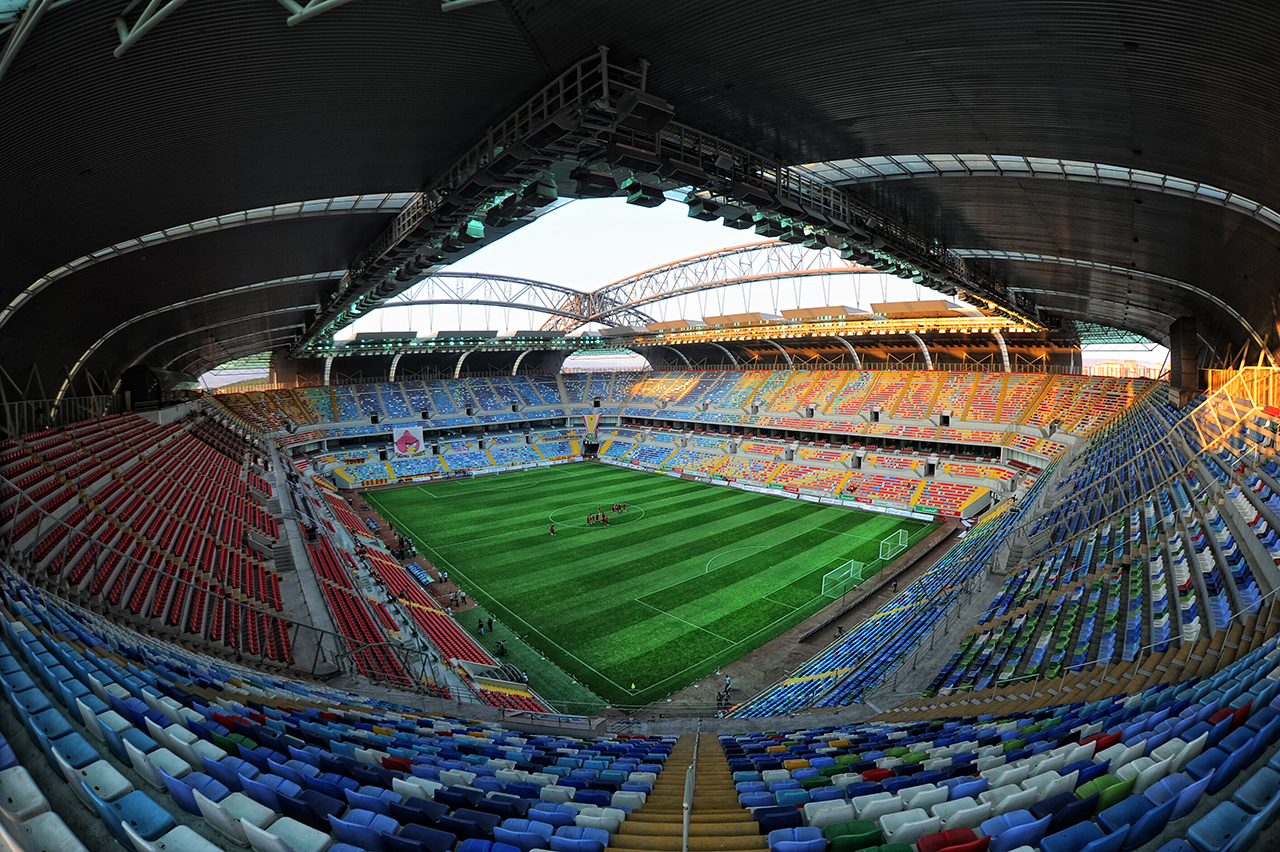
An interior view of Kadir Has Stadium.

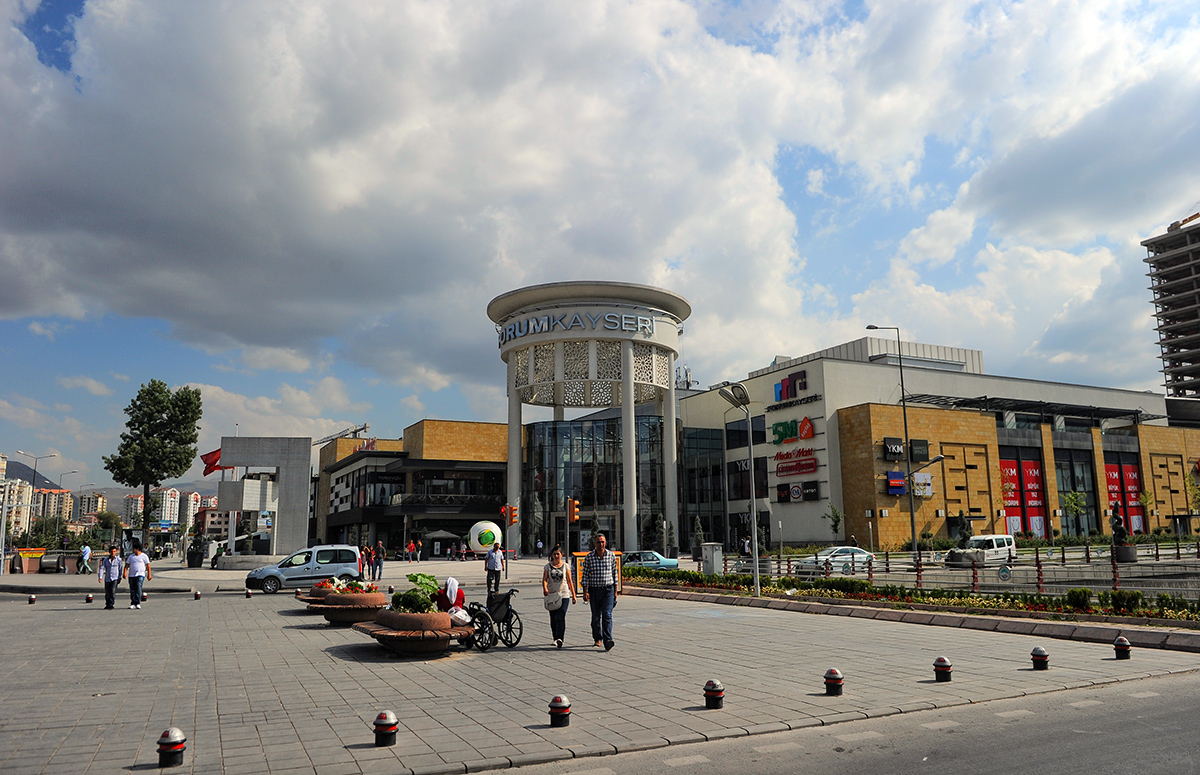
Forum Kayseri, a shopping center featuring retail stores, dining options, and entertainment facilities.

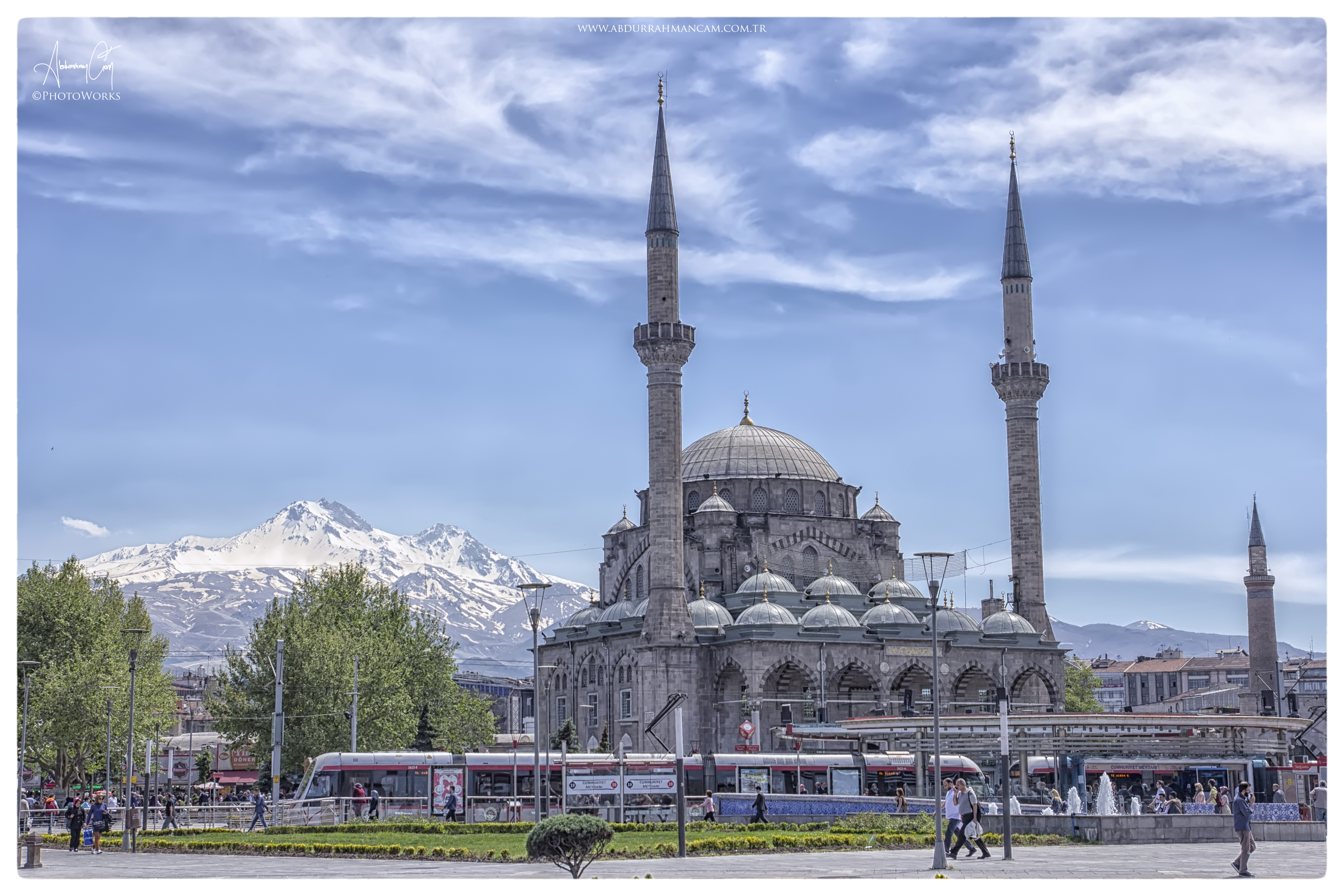
A panoramic view of the Bürüngüz Mosque in Kayseri.

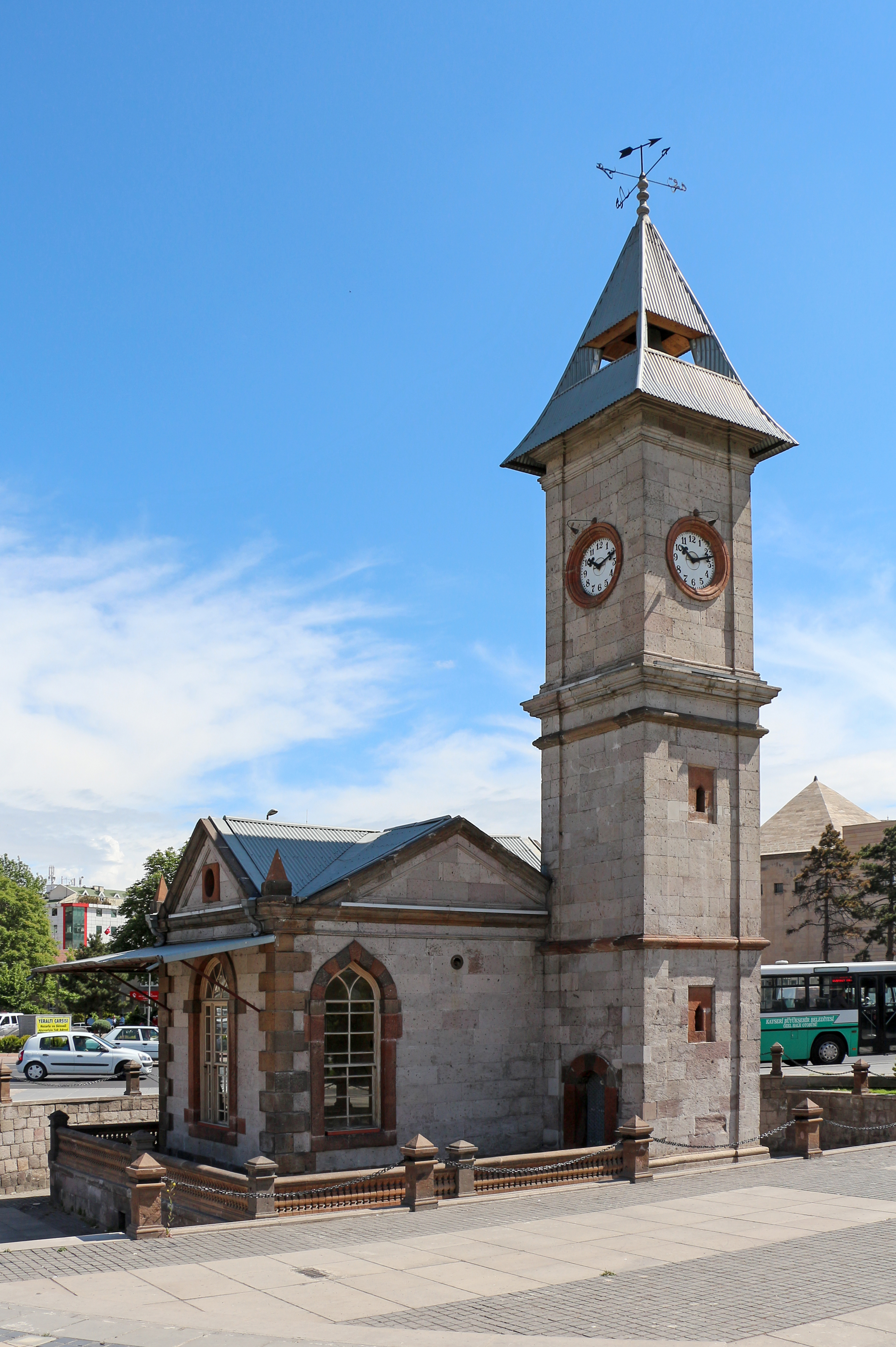
Kayseri Clock Tower, a historic clock tower located in the city center.

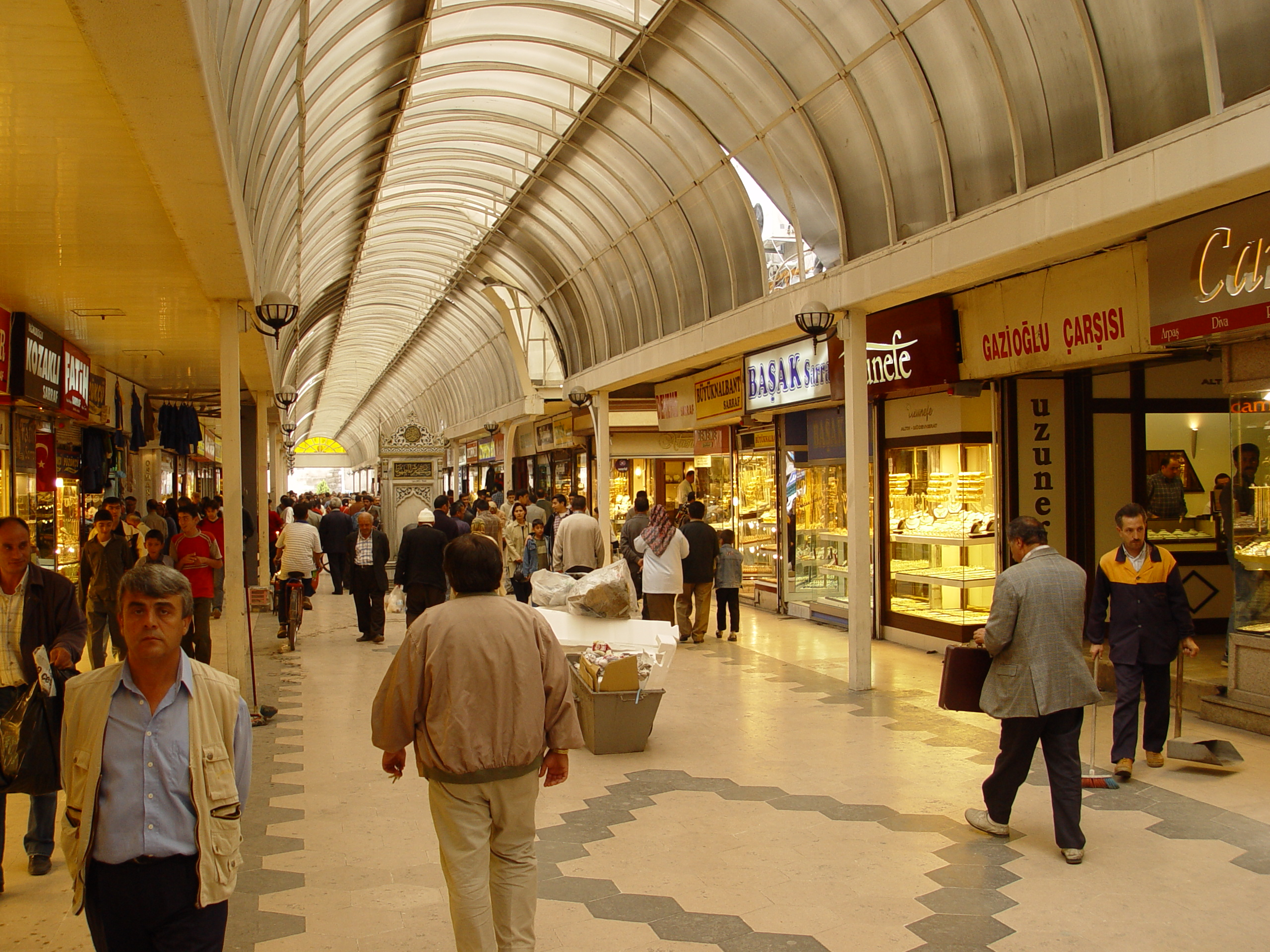
Kayseri Kapalı Çarşı (Covered Bazaar)

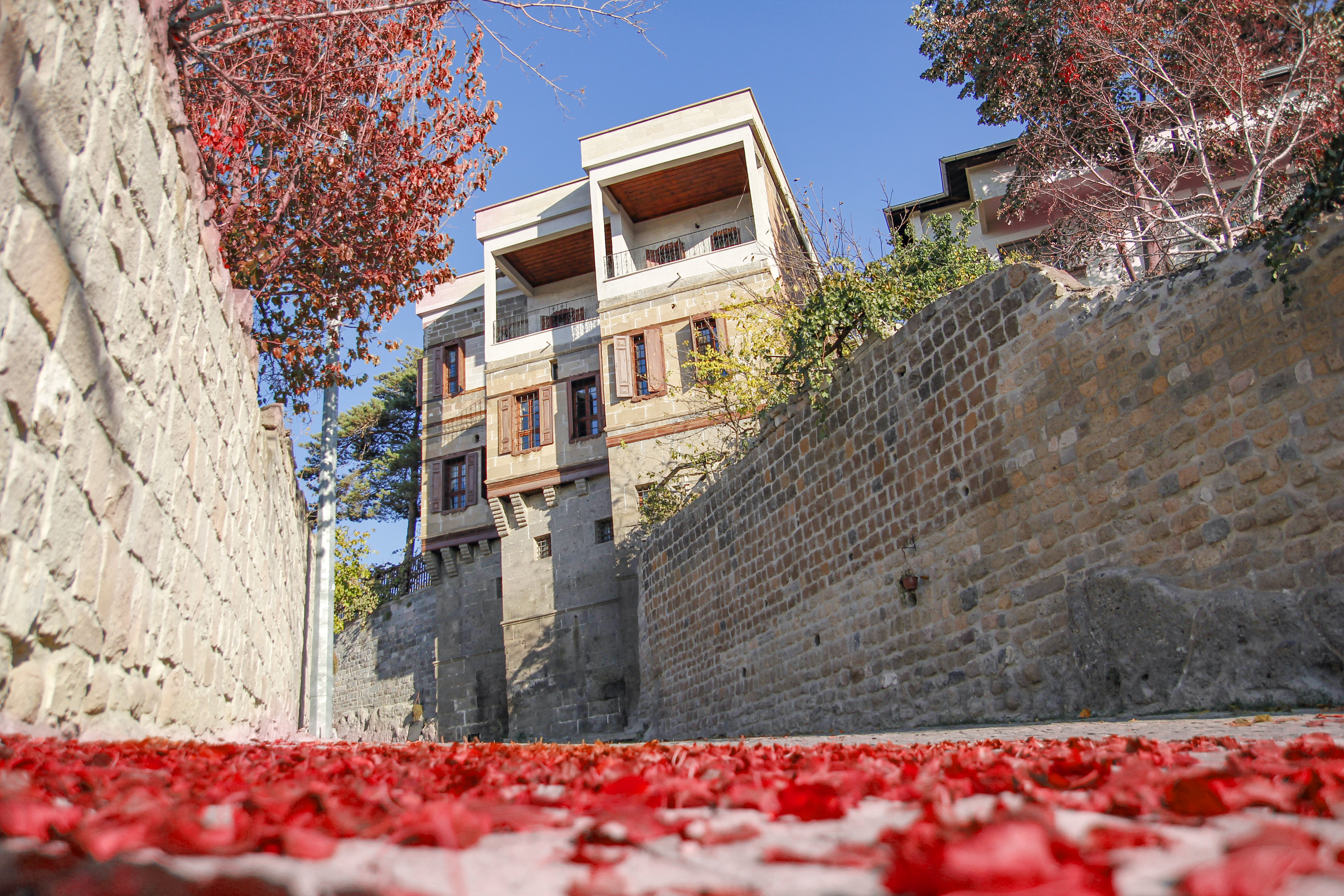
A historic house in Kayseri, showcasing the region's traditional architecture.

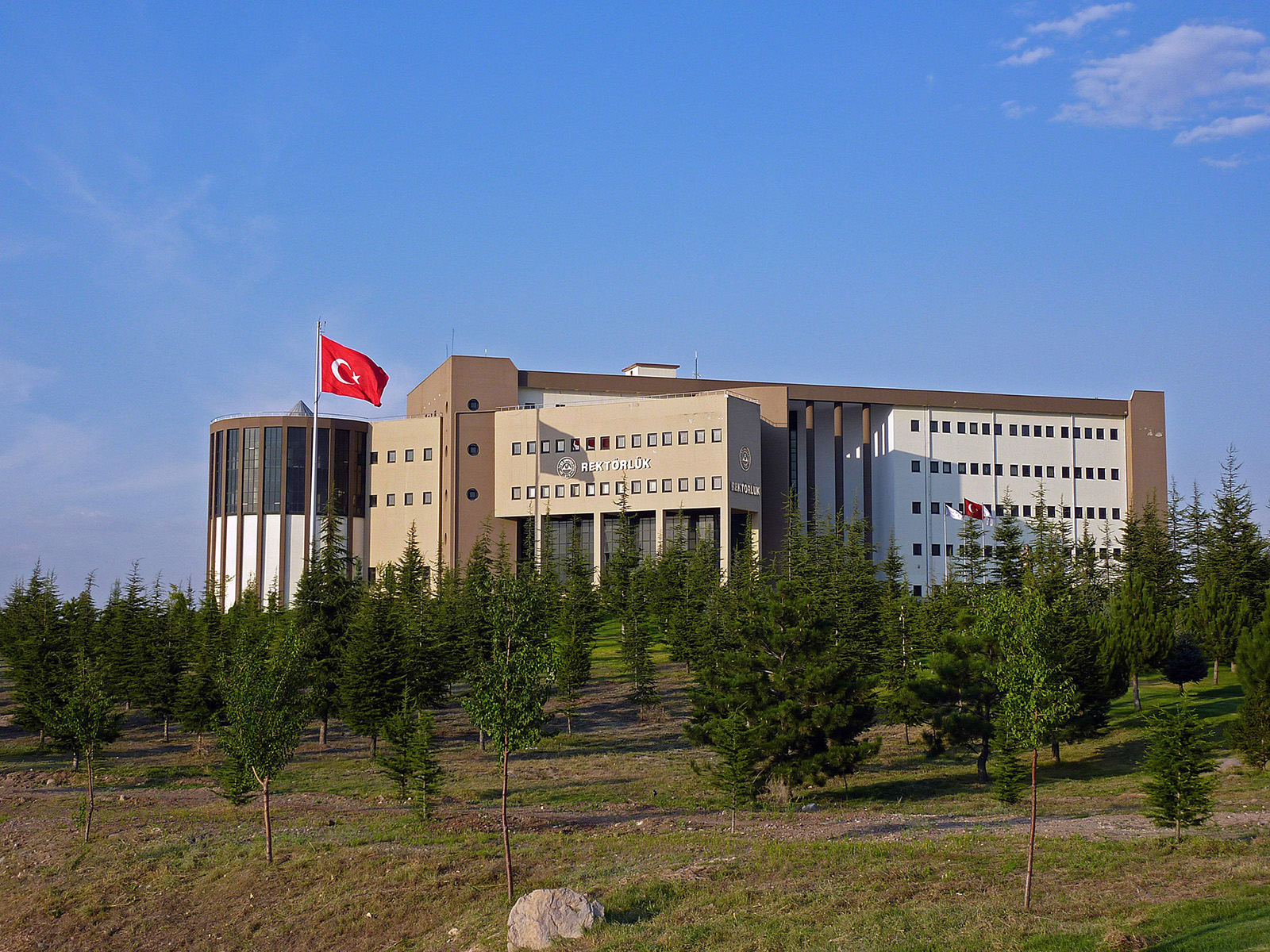
Erciyes University, a major research university in Kayseri.

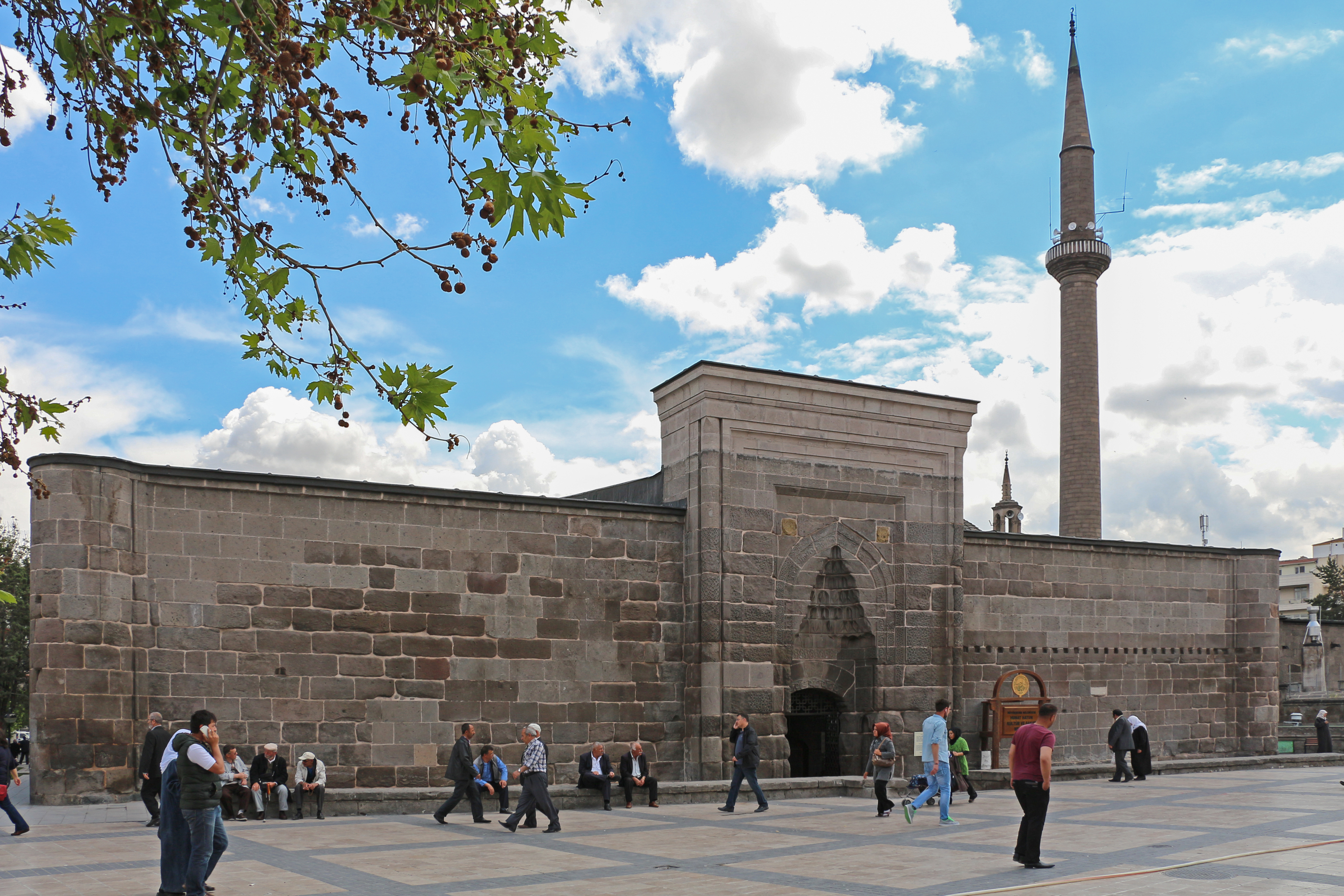
Hunat Hatun Medresesi, a 13th-century Islamic school and complex.

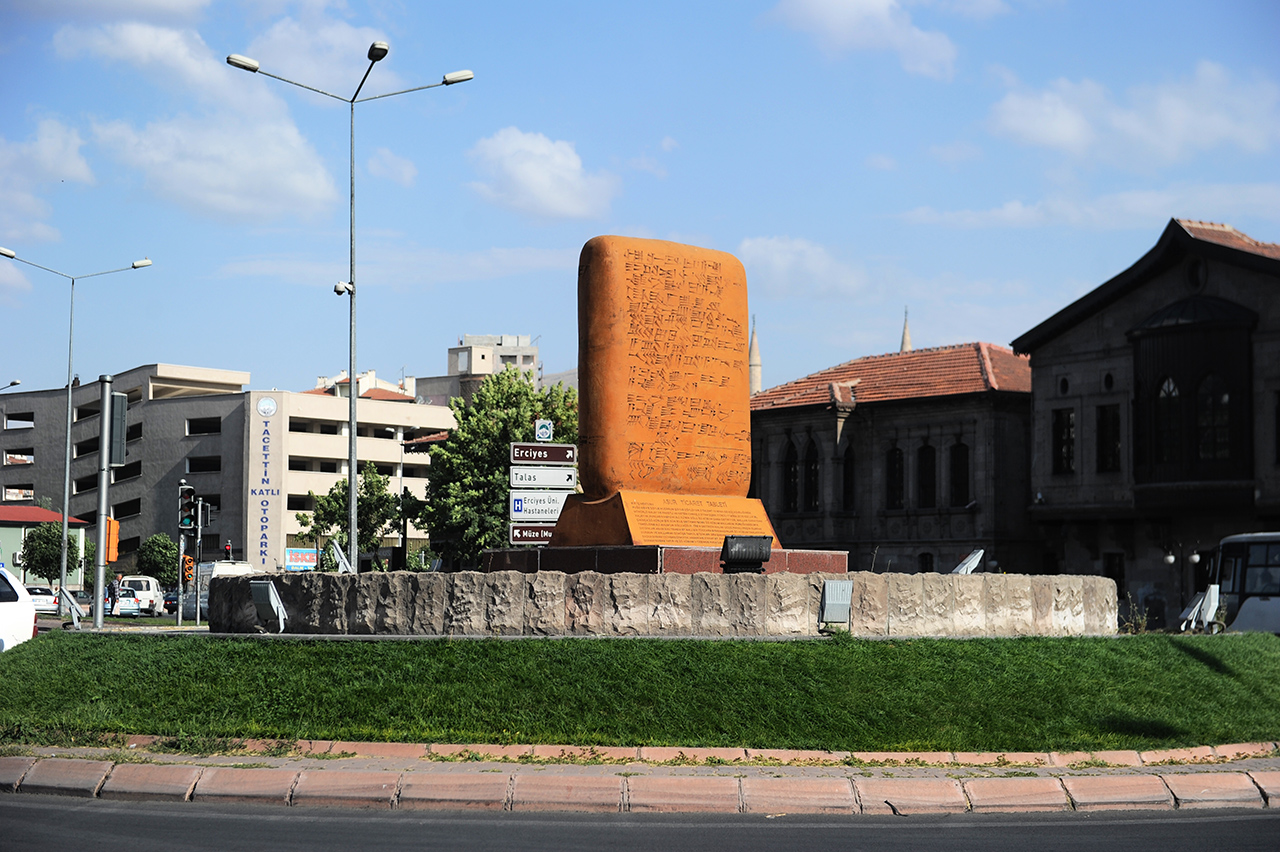
Statue of an Assyrian Tablet, a replica of an ancient Assyrian tablet displayed in Kayseri.

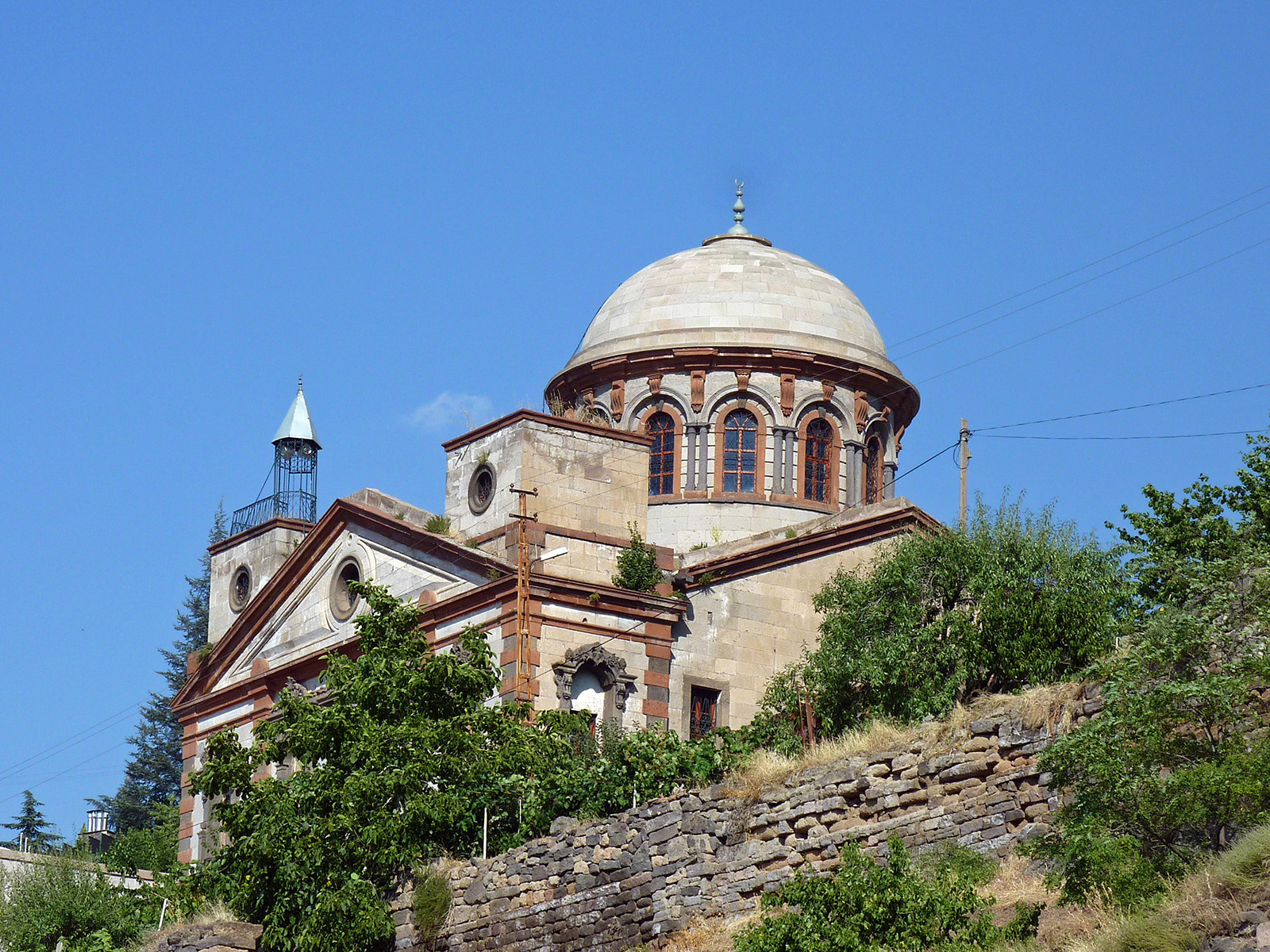
A historic building in Talas that was originally a Greek church and has been converted into a mosque.

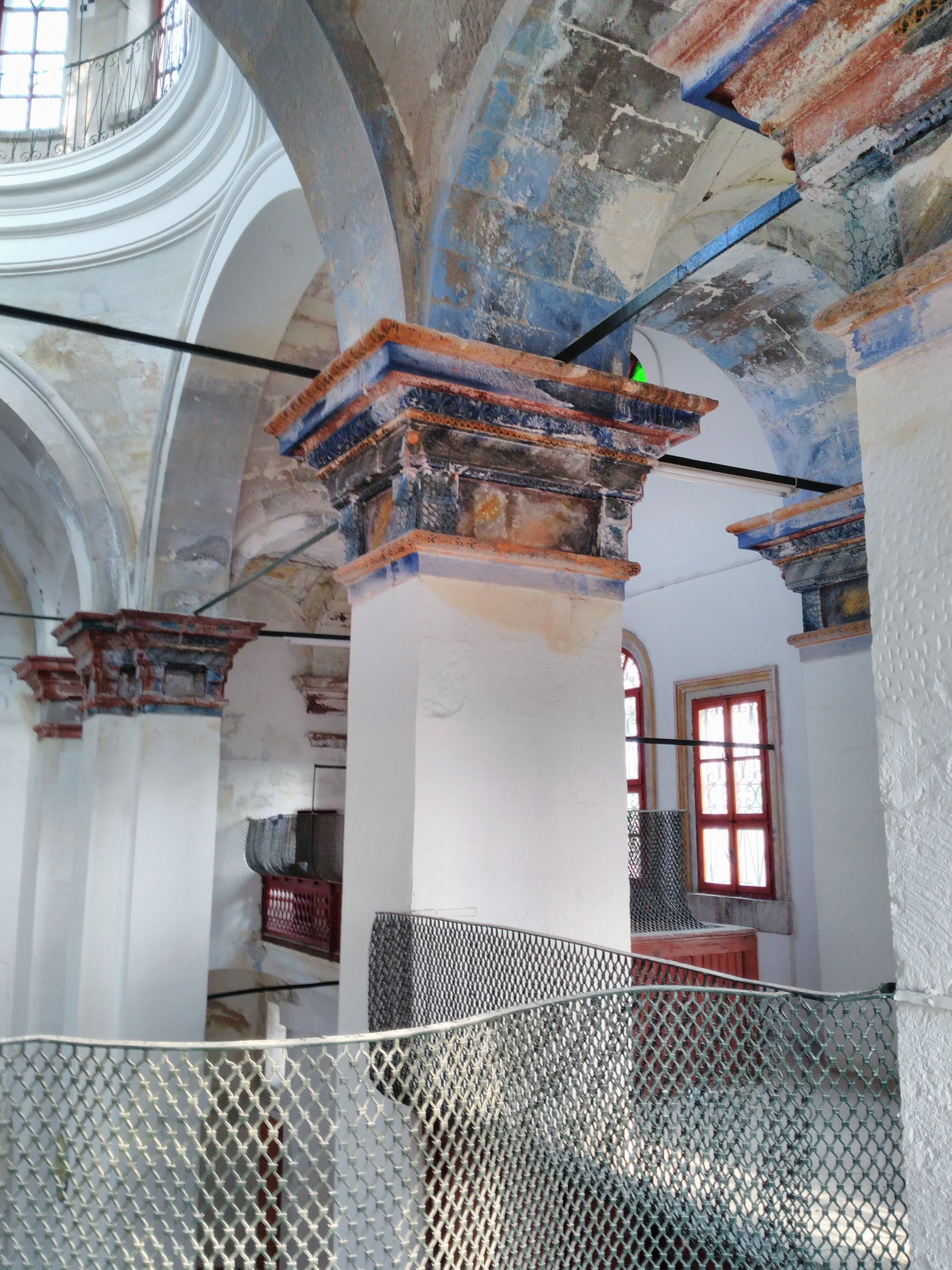
Interior of Yaman Dede Mosque or Panaghia Church located in Talas

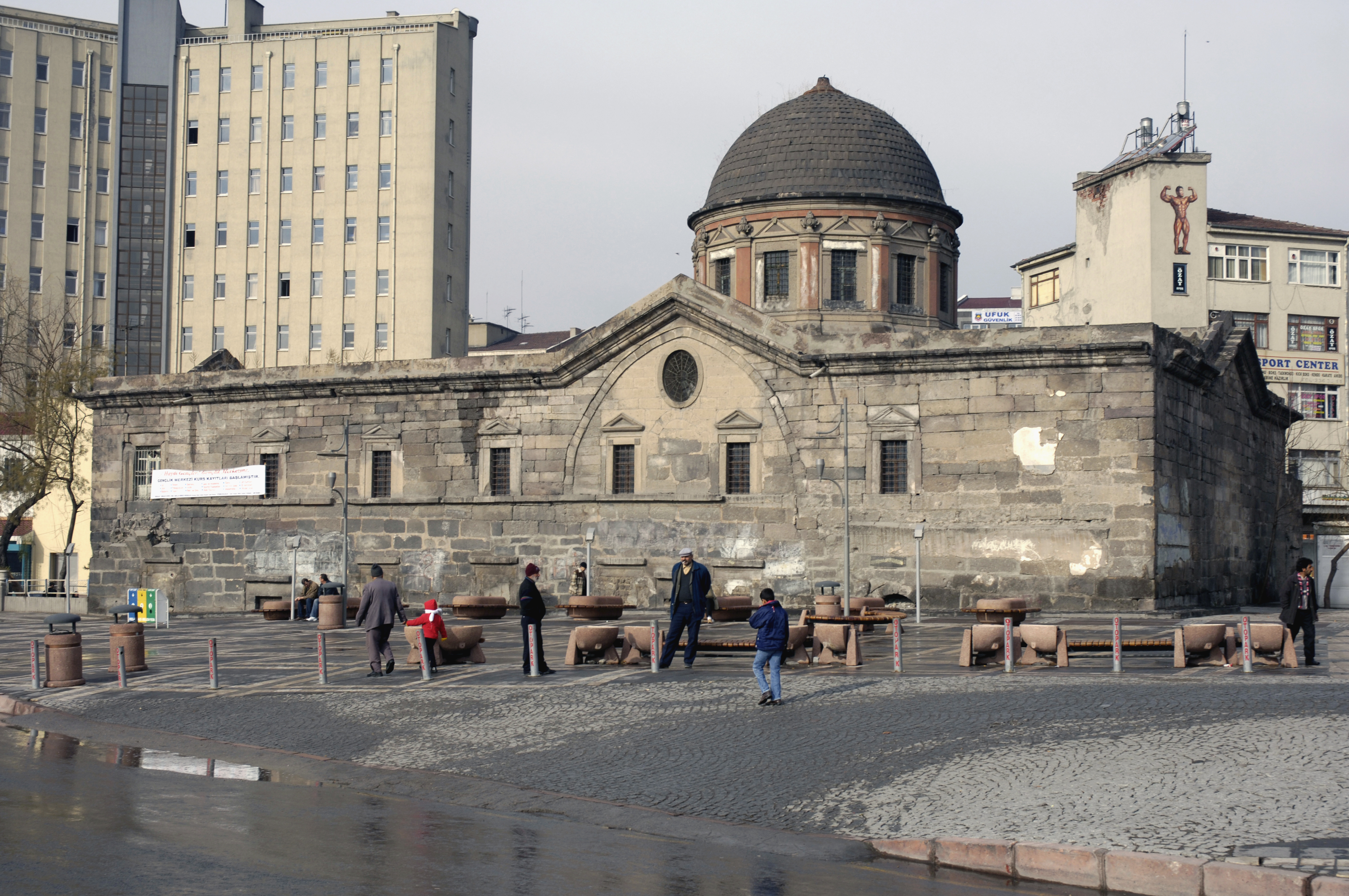
Kayseri Virgin Mary Church in

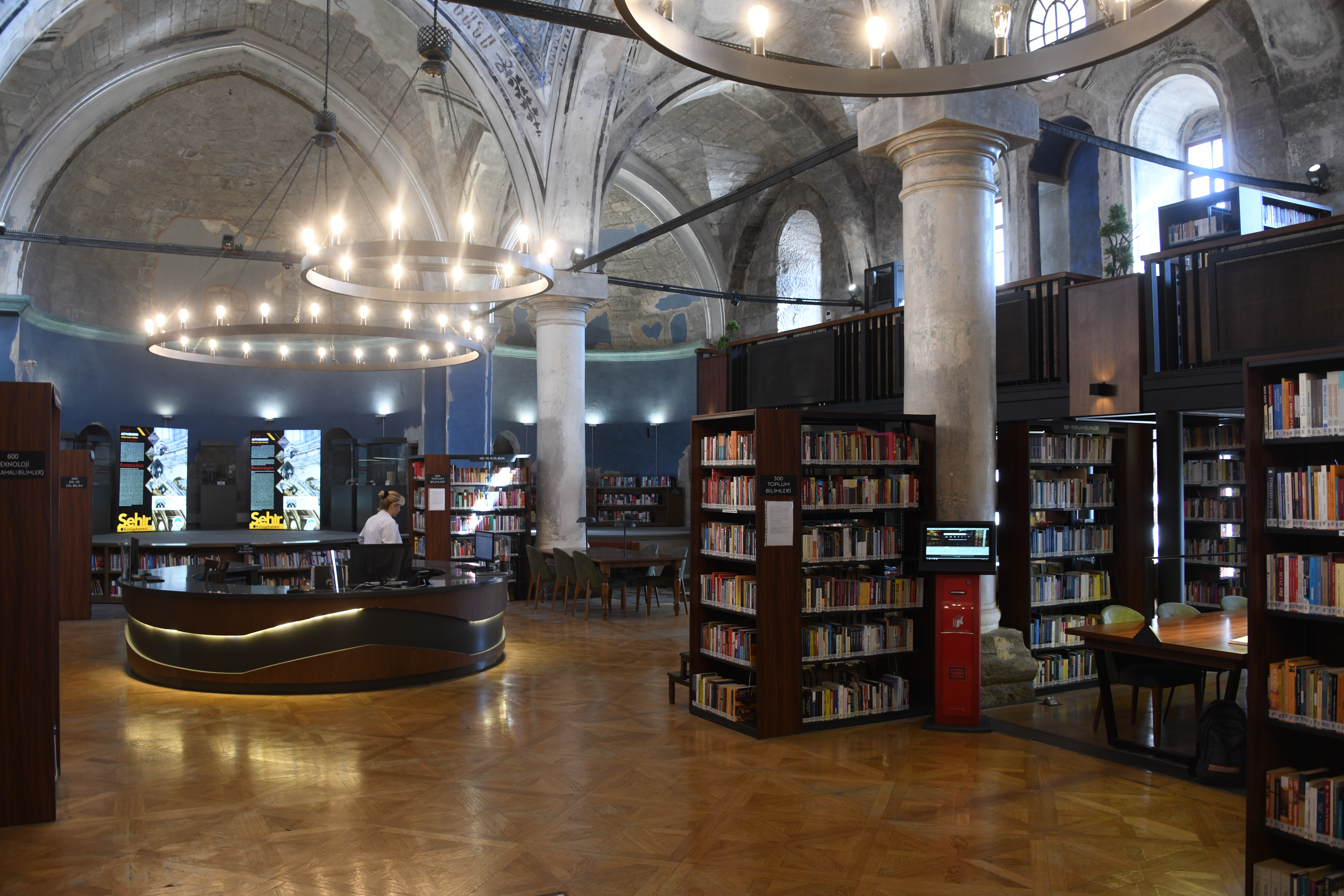
Interior of Kayseri Virgin Mary Church in the Cumhuriyet quarter of Melikgazi

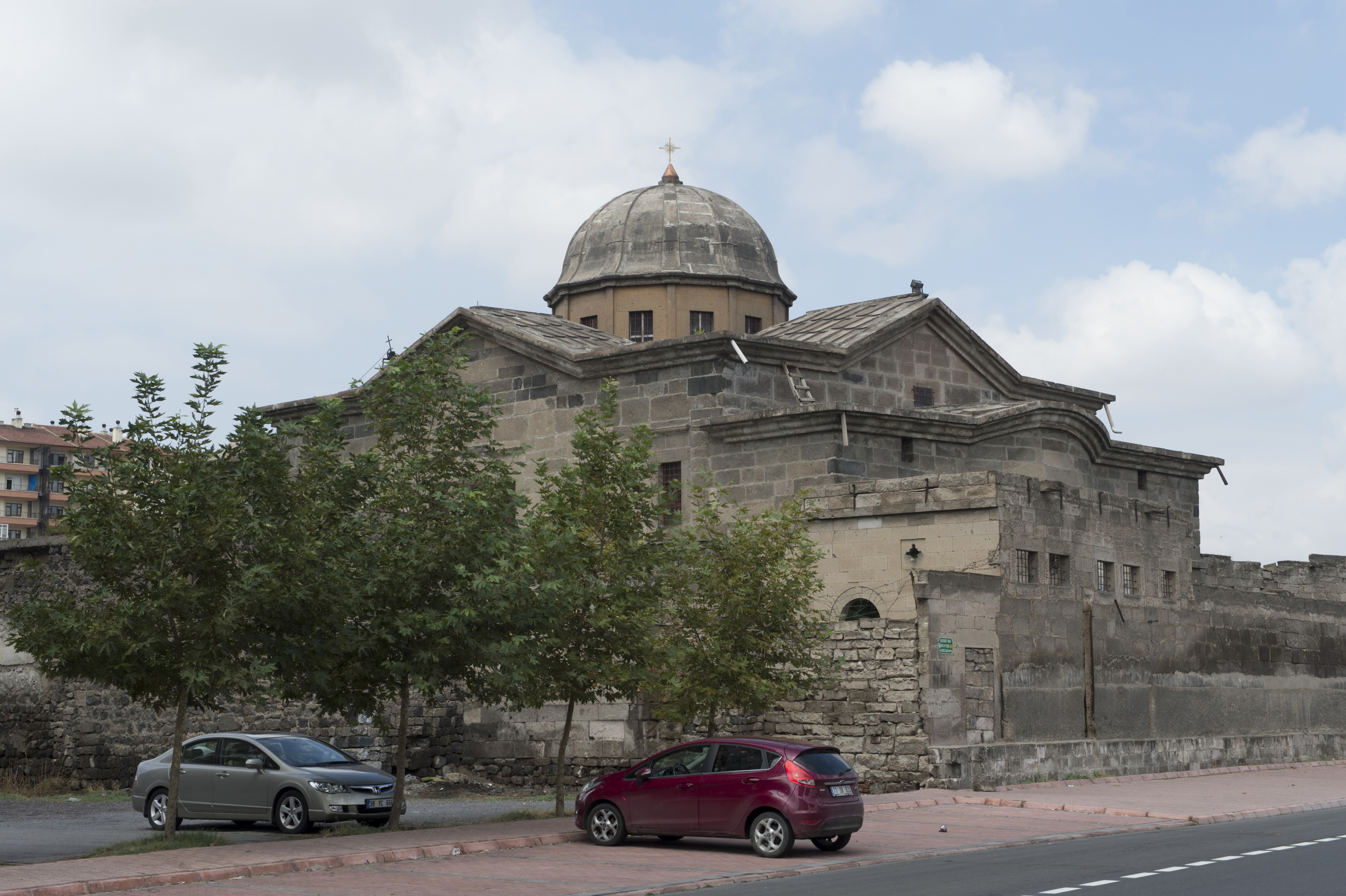
Kayseri Surp Kirkor Lusavoric Armenian Church from main road

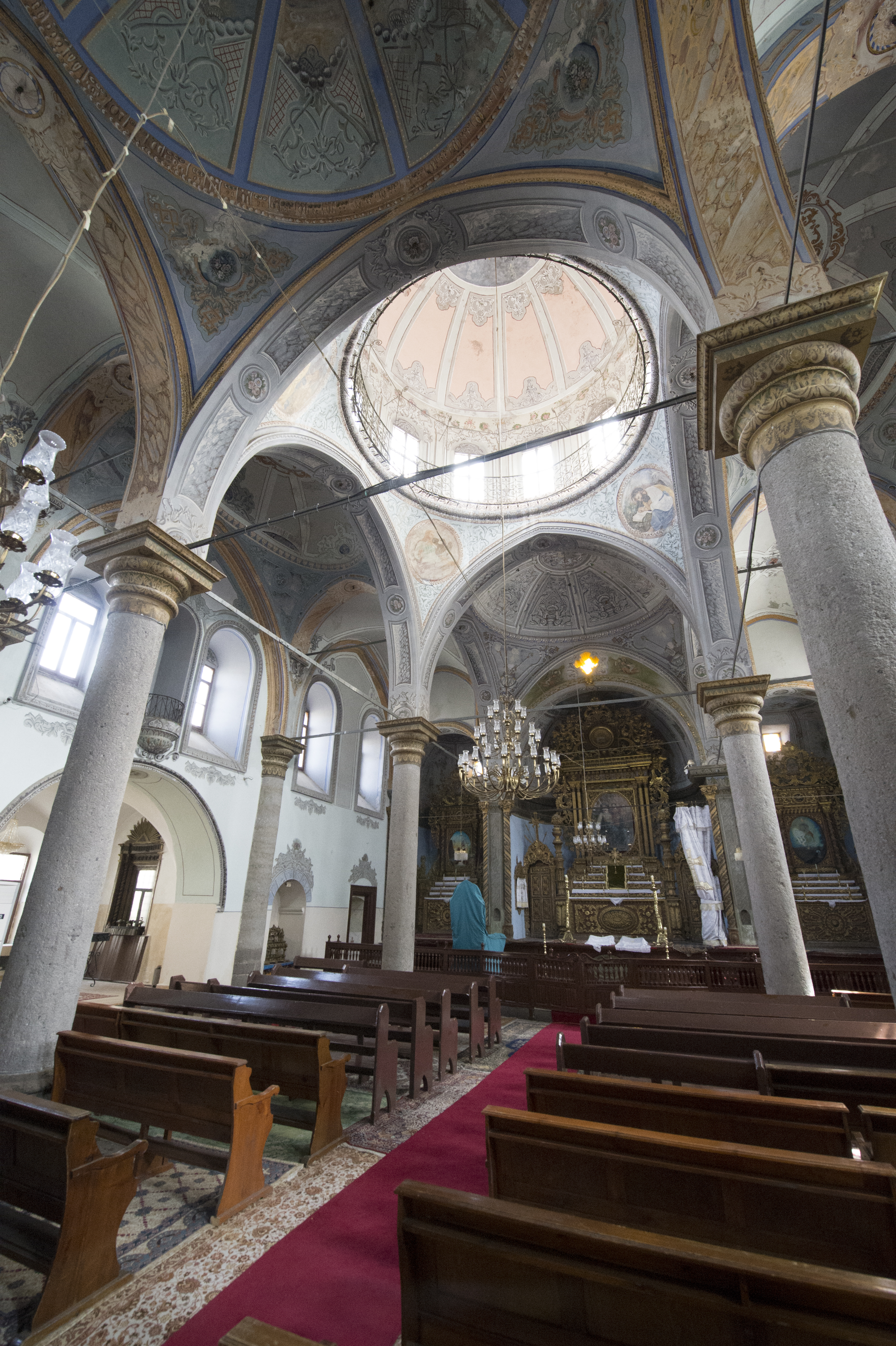
Interior of Kayseri Surp Kirkor Lusavoric Armenian Church

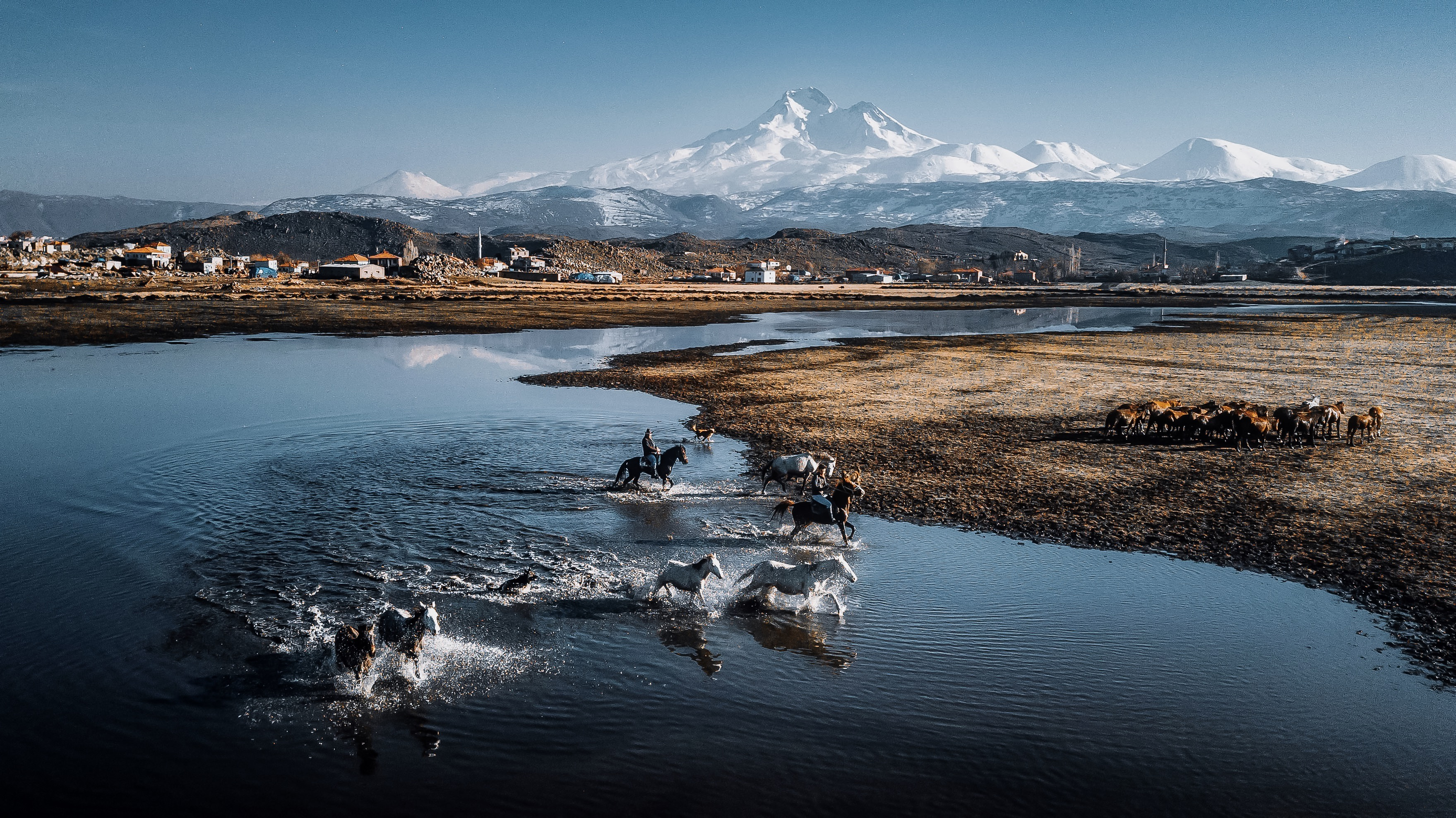
Mount Erciyes, a prominent volcanic mountain near Kayseri, known for its ski resort and hiking trails.

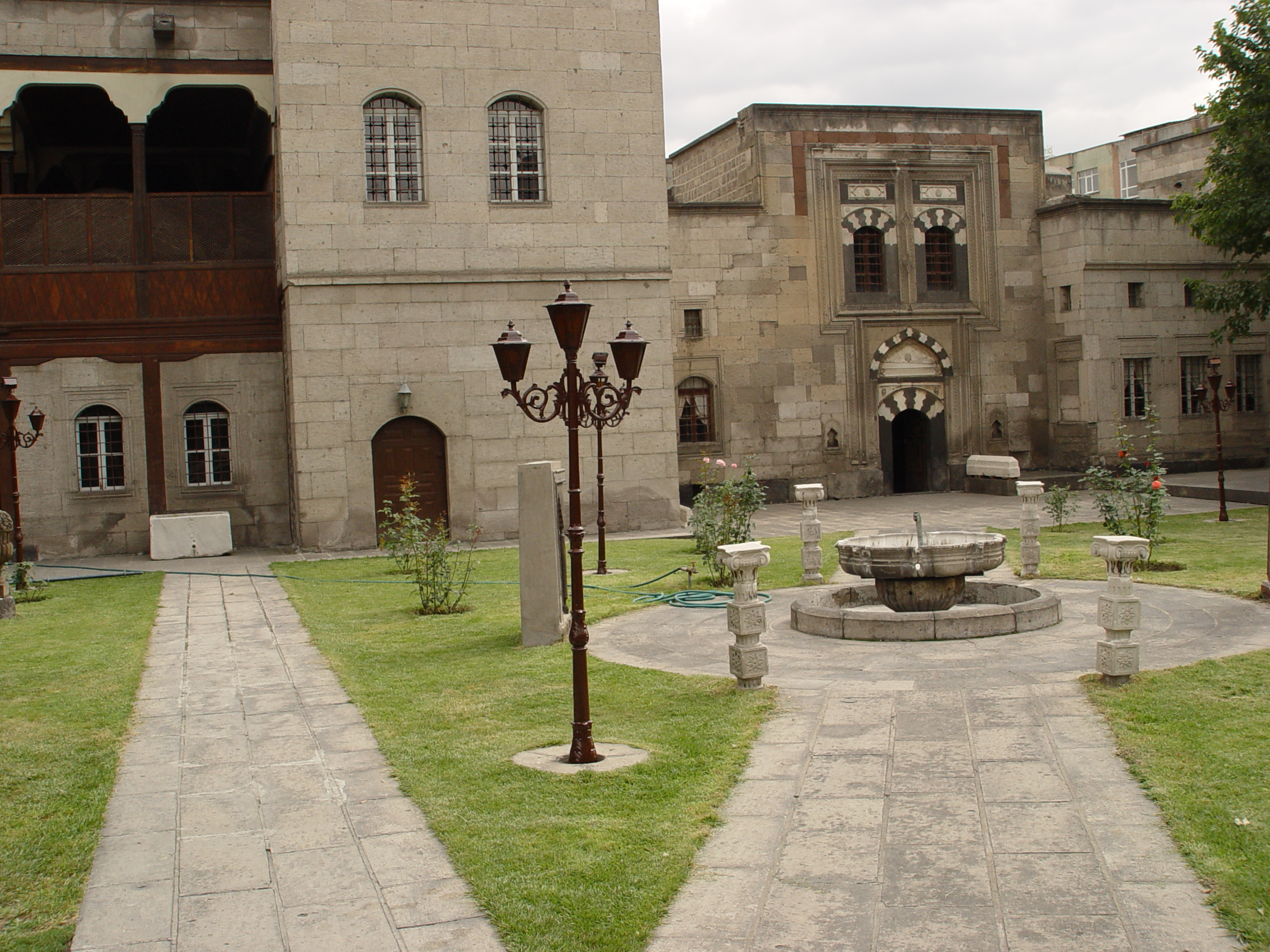
Kayseri Ethnography Museum, a museum focuses the region's cultural heritage.

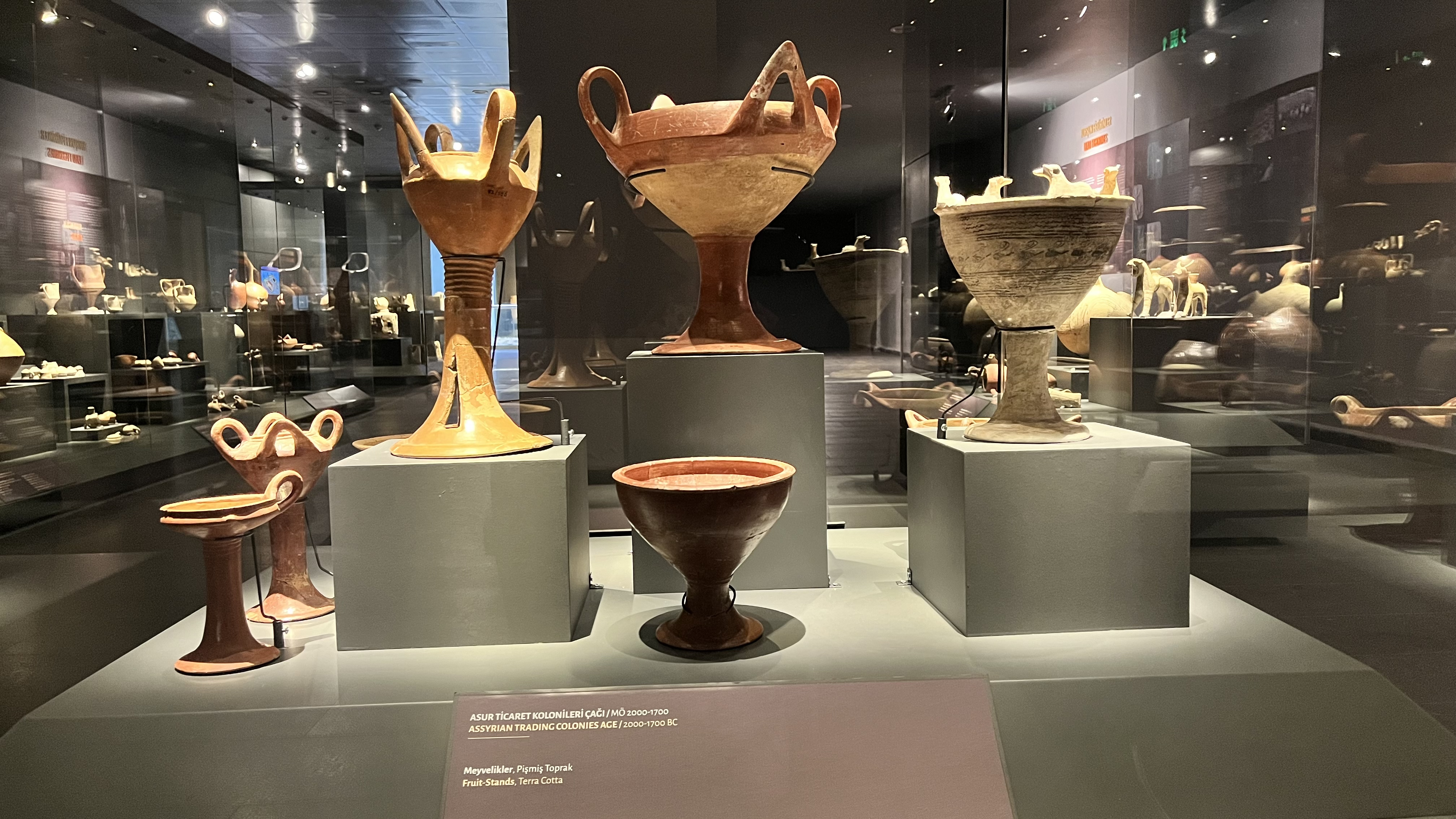
Assyrian Trading Colonies Age - 2000-1700 BC, Kayseri Archaeology Museum, Fruit-Stands, Terra Cotta.

Kayseri National War Museum (Formerly Kayseri High School)

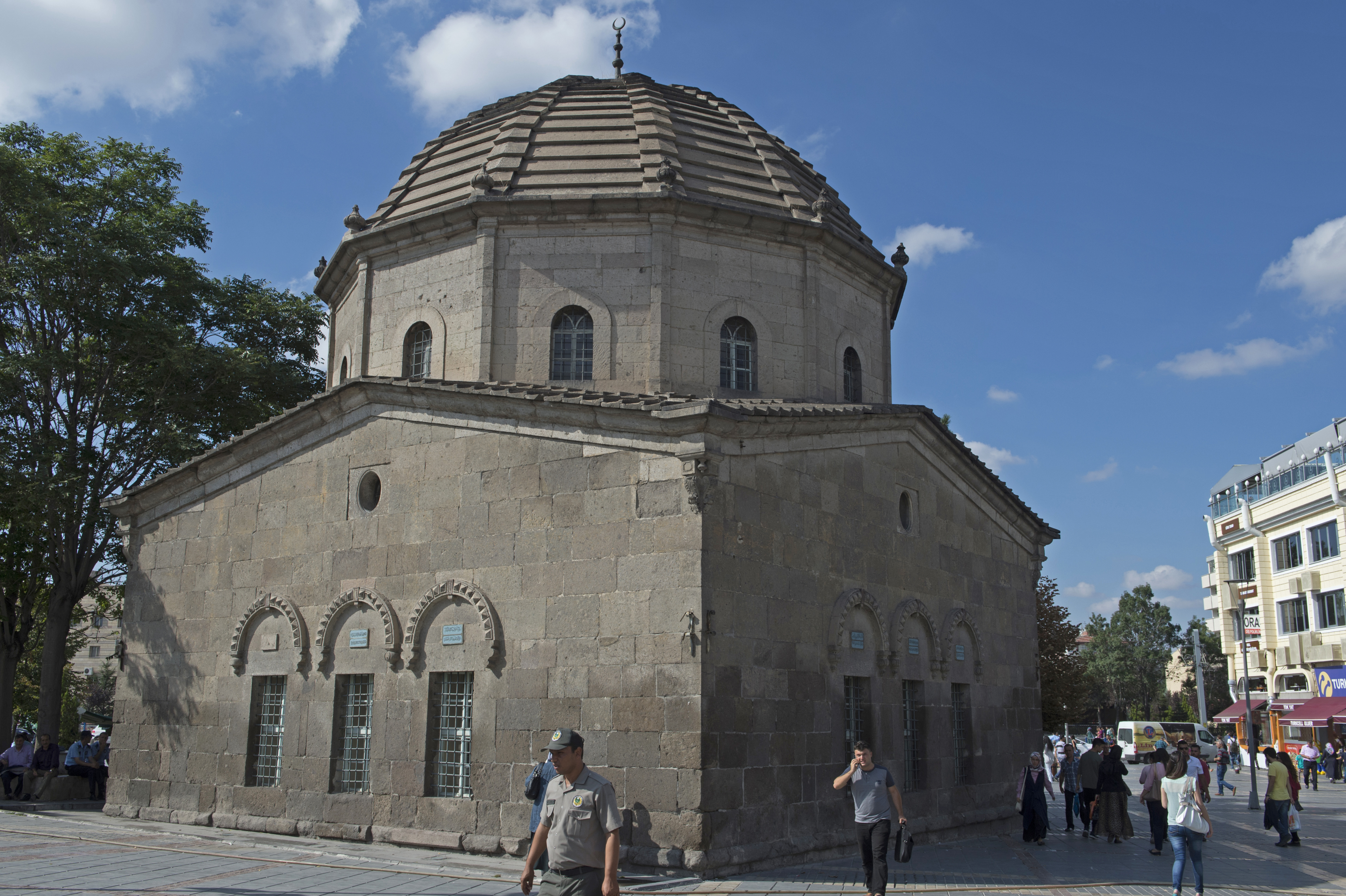
Kayseri Zeynel Abidi Tomb

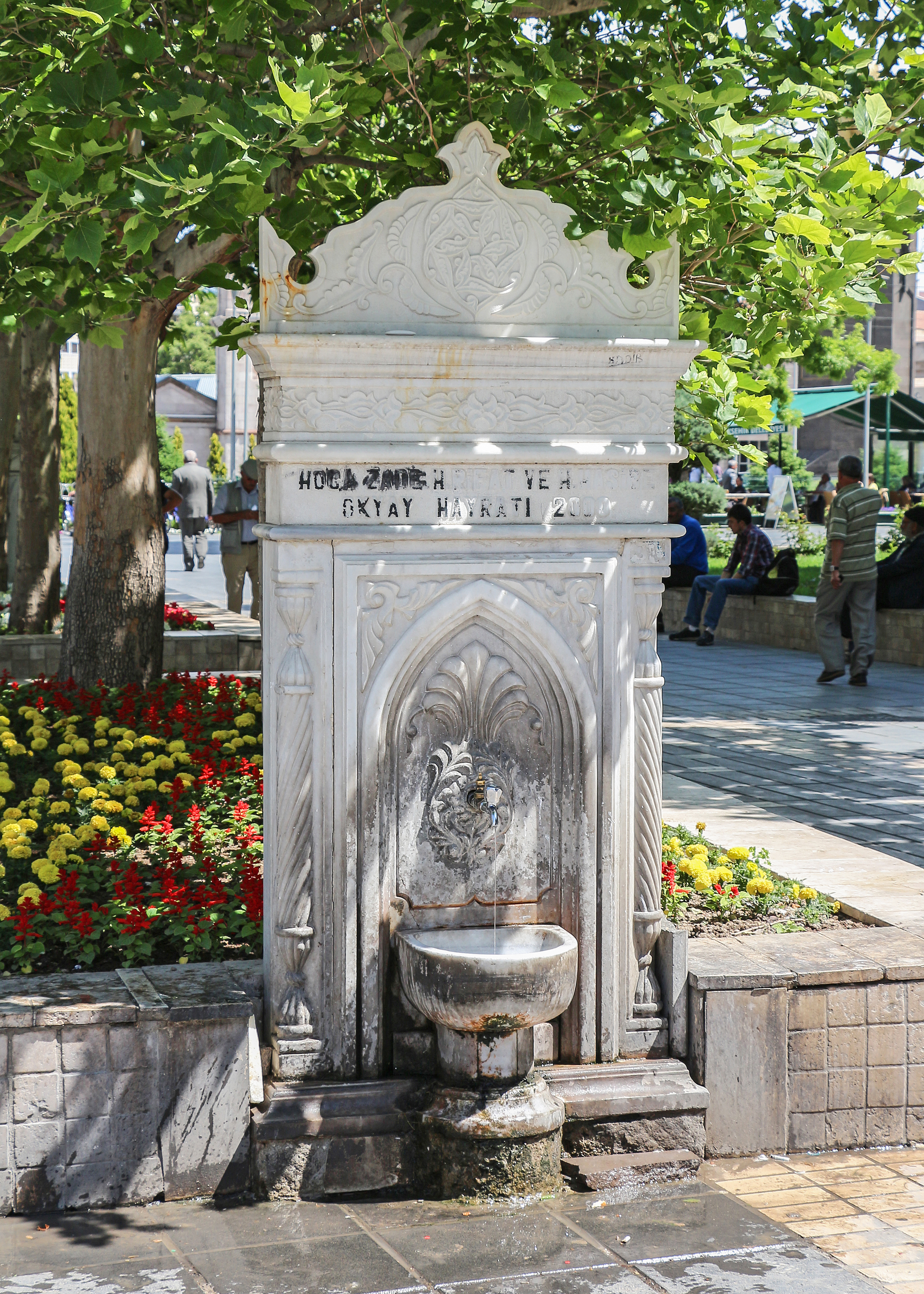
Fountain in Kayseri.

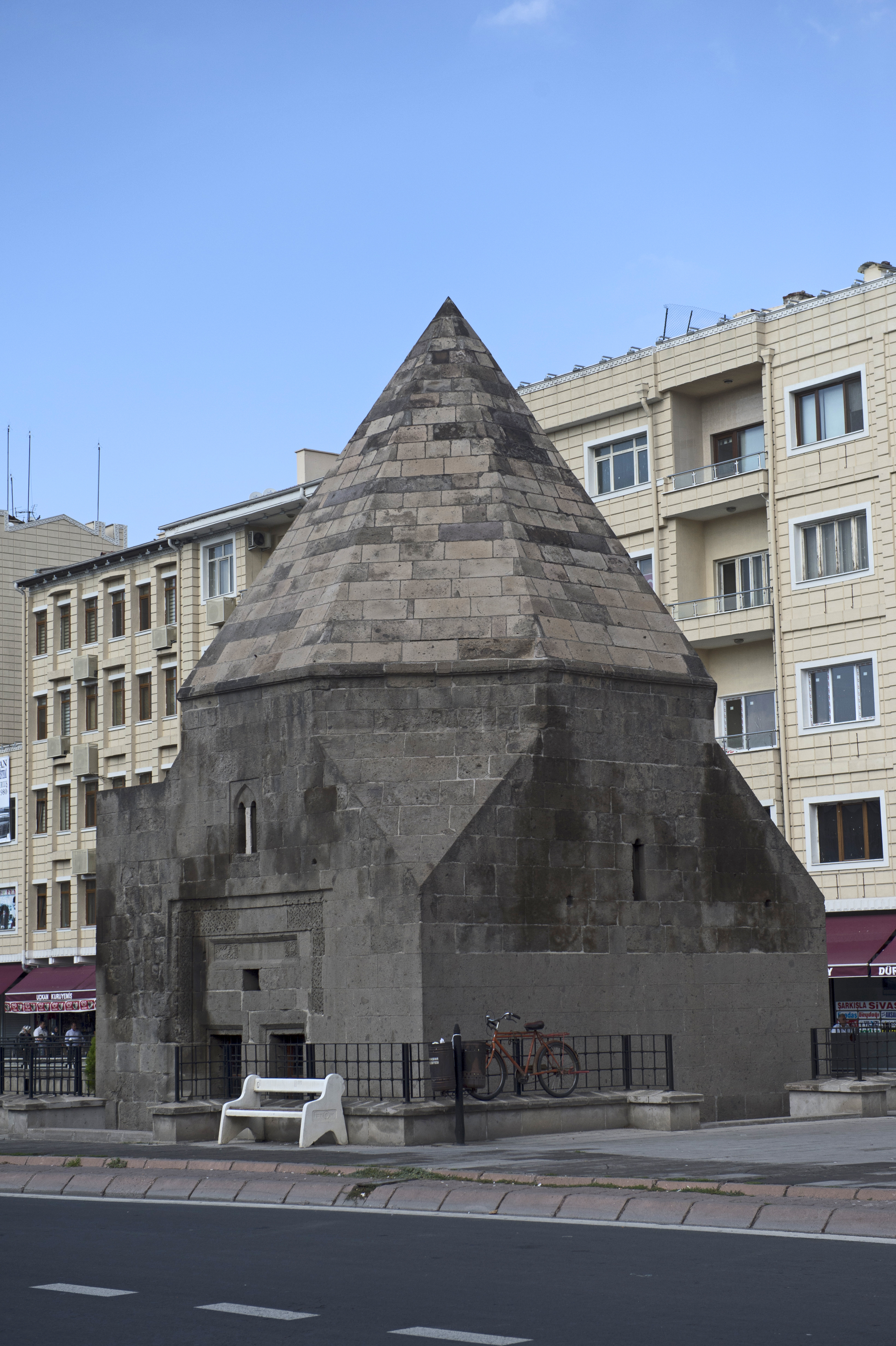
Kayseri Alaca Dome

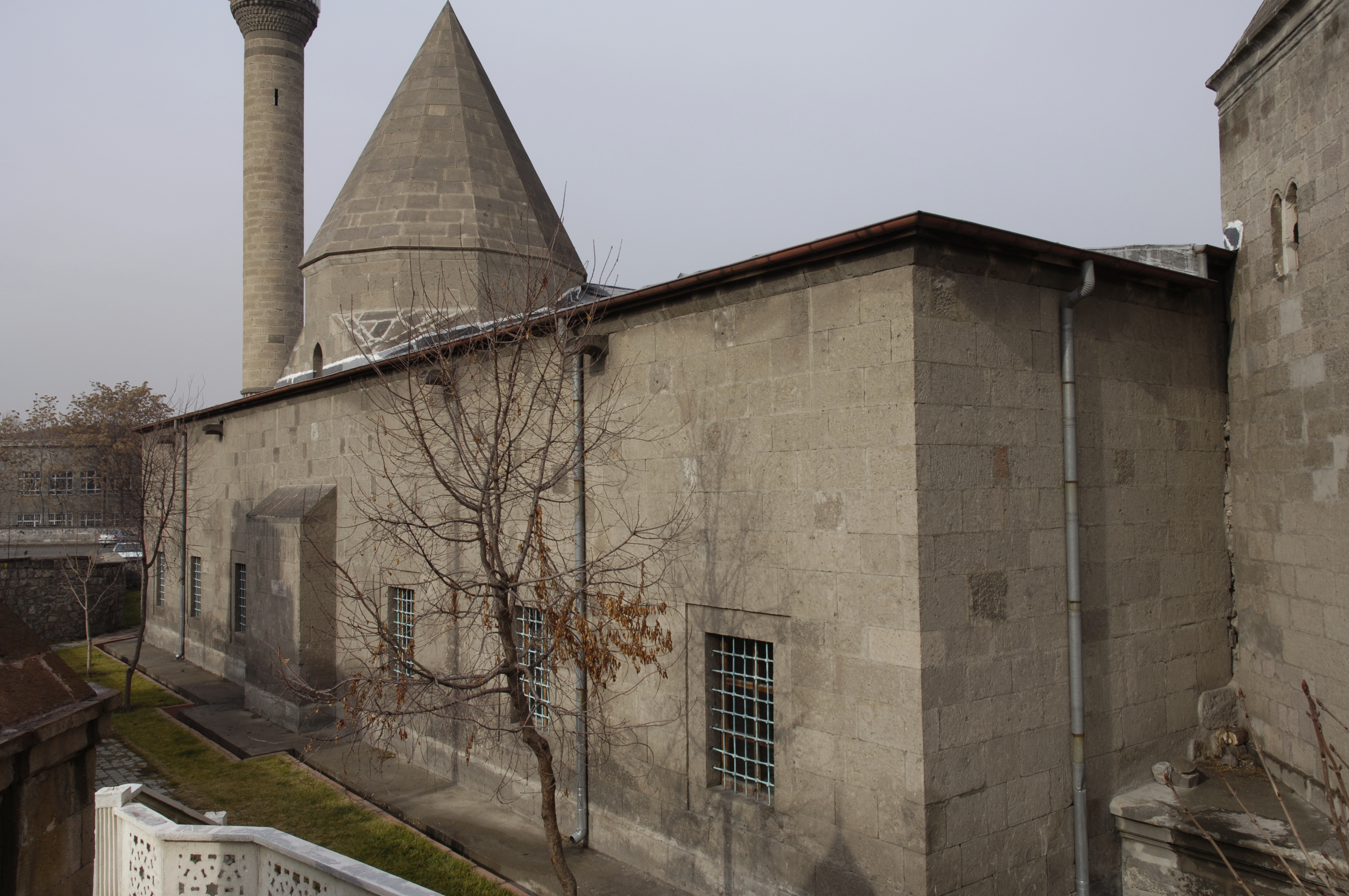
Lale Muslihiddin Paşa Mosque and Complex

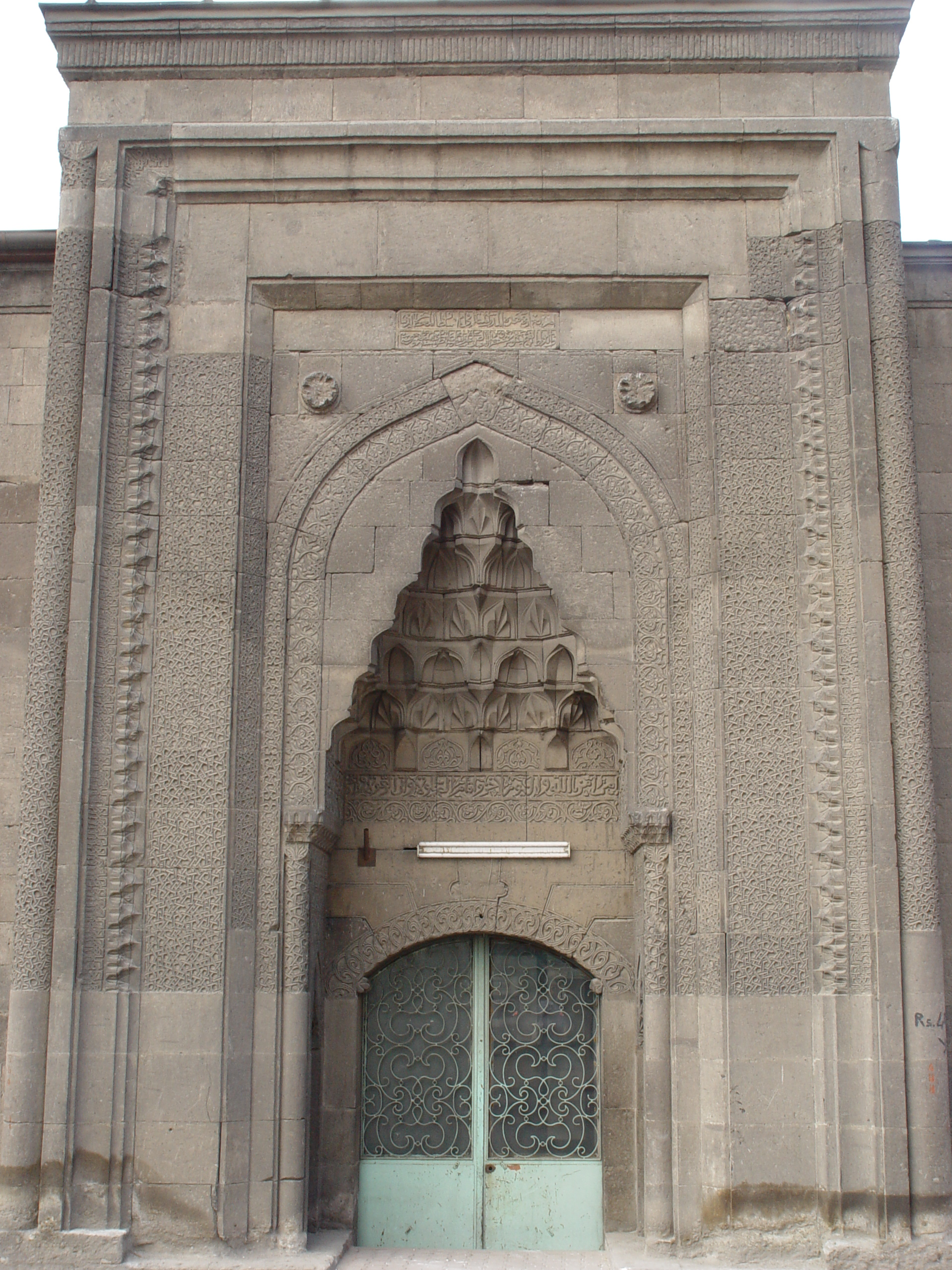
Kayseri Hacıkılıç Mosque and Medresesi

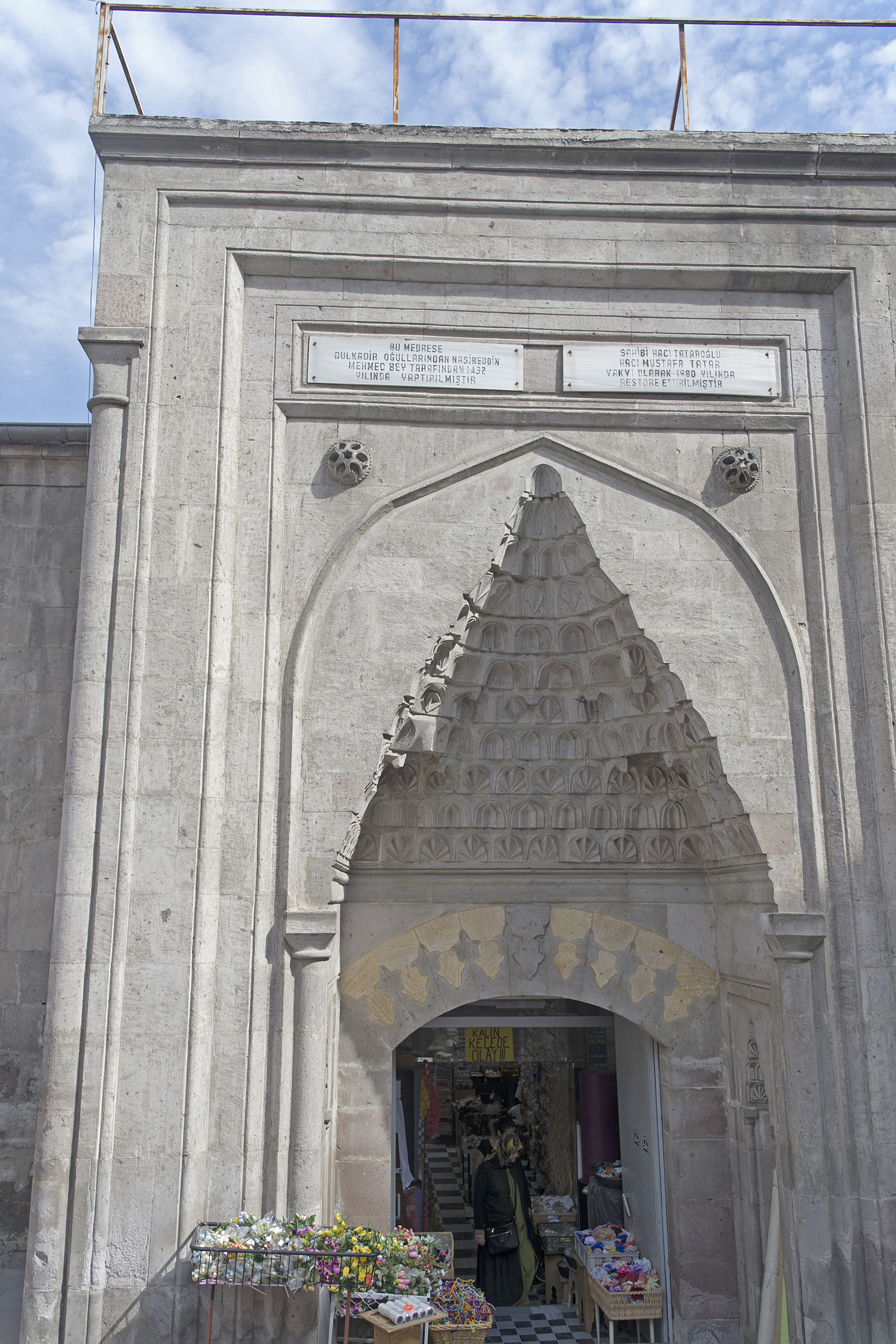
Kayseri Hatuniye Medresesi

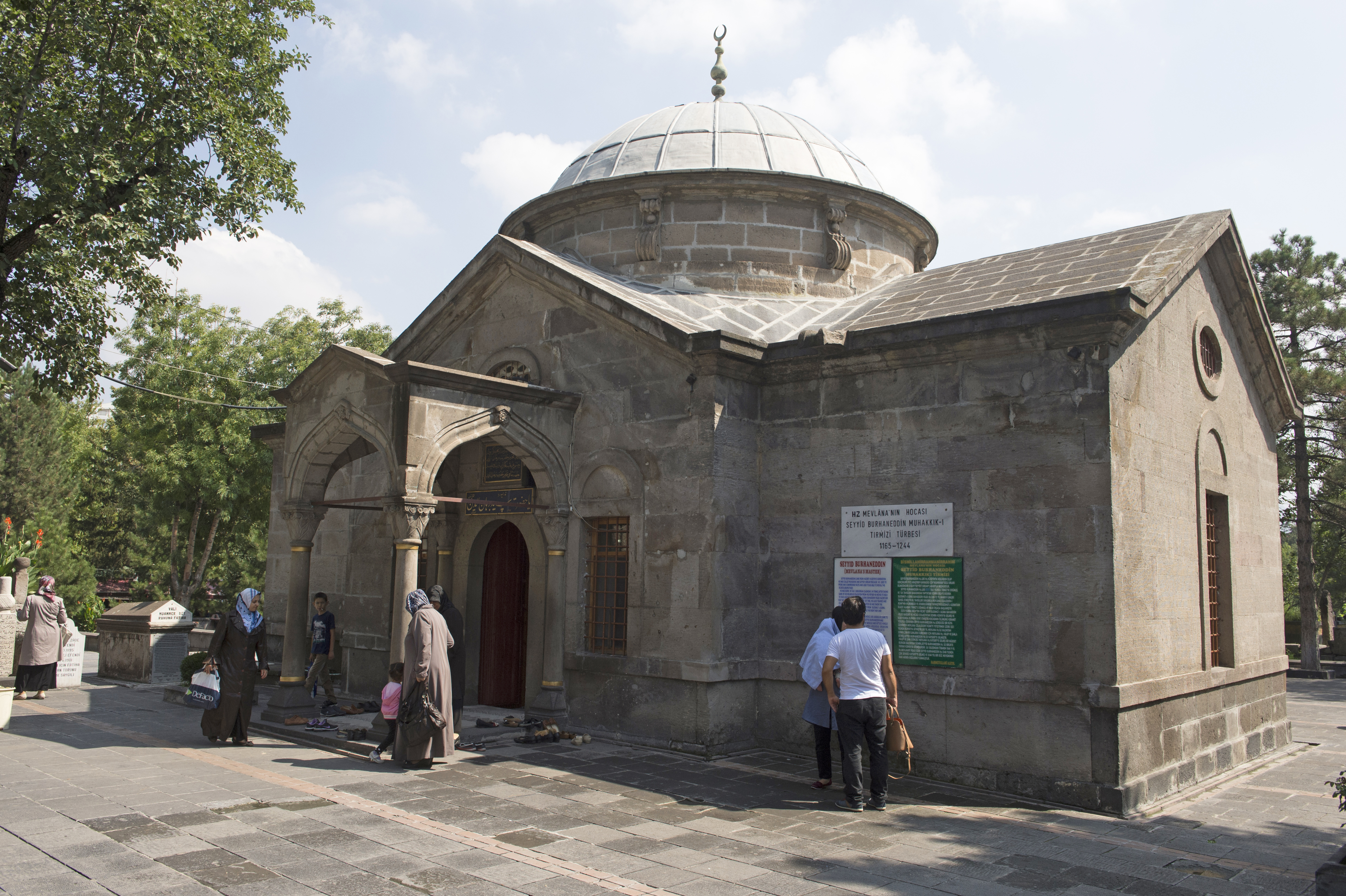
Seyyid Burhaneddin Tomb

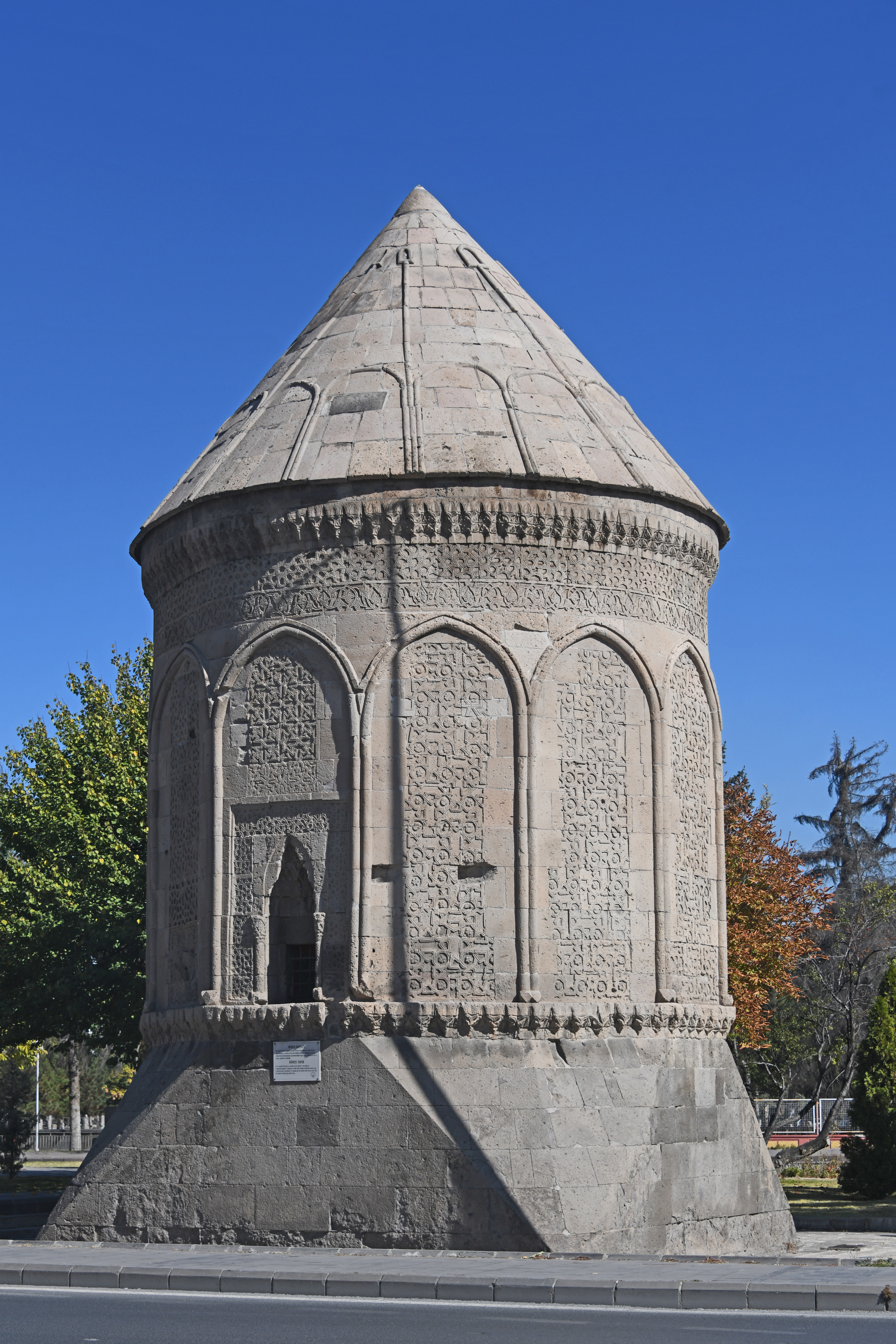
Kayseri Döner Tomb

== Notable people ==
- Konstantinos Adosidis, (1818–1895), Ottoman-appointed Prince of Samos from 1873 to 1874
- Hulusi Akar (born 1952), former chief of Turkish Armed Forces and Minister of National Defense and current MP
- Nikolaos Alektoridis (1874–1909), Greek painter and a member of the Munich School
- Arandzar (1877–1913), Armenian poet
- Paisios of Mount Athos (1924–1996), well-known Eastern Orthodox ascetic and Athonite monk
- Kadir Bal (born 1966), Turkish bureaucrat, diplomat and engineer
- Krikor Balyan (1764–1831), Patriarch of the Armenian Balyan Family of Ottoman court architects
- Mehmet Nâzım Bey (1886-1921), officer of the Ottoman Army and the Turkish Army
- Mehmet Bozdağ (born 1983), Turkish screenwriter, film producer, and director
- Arthur H. Bulbulian (1900–1996), Armenian-American physician and inventor
- Kadi Burhan al-Din (1345–1398), Vizier to the Eretnid rulers of Anatolia
- Basil of Caesarea (330–378), early Roman Christian prelate, one of the Cappadocian Fathers and Doctor of the Church
- Vahan Cardashian (1882–1934), Armenian-American political activist and lawyer
- Paisius II of Constantinople (?-1756), Ecumenical Patriarch of Constantinople for four times in the 18th century
- Halit Cıngıllıoğlu (born 1954), Turkish banker, industrialist and contemporary art collector
- Nuri Demirağ (1883–1957), Turkish engineer, businessman and politician of founder in Millî Kalkınma Partisi
- Emmanouil Emmanouilidis (1867–1943), Ottoman Greek MP for the Committee of Union and Progress
- Atilla Engin (1946–2019), Turkish-American fusion jazz drummer
- Elif Eralp (born 1981), German politician serving as the leader of Die Linke in the House of Representatives of Berlin
- Mehmet Burak Erdoğan (born 1972), Turkish mathematician at the University of Illinois Urbana-Champaign
- Ahmet Cemal Eringen (1921–2009), engineering scientist, professor at Princeton University
- Turhan Feyzioğlu (1922–1988), Turkish constitutional law professor, politician and first Turkish rector of METU
- Carrie Farnsworth Fowle (1854–1917), American missionary
- Michail Grigoriadis (1841-?), Ottoman-appointed Prince of Samos from 1900 to 1902
- Haig Gudenian (1885-1972), Armenian-American violinist, composer, and author
- Calouste Gulbenkian (1869–1955), British-Armenian businessman and philanthropist, shareholder of Royal Dutch Shell
- Nubar Gulbenkian (1896–1972), British-Armenian business magnate and socialite
- Berna Gözbaşı (born 1974), Turkish businesswoman and the former president of Kayserispor
- Hayrünnisa Gül (born 1965), 11th First Lady of Turkey
- Abdullah Gül (born 1950), 11th President of Turkey
- Ferruh Güpgüp (1891–1951), Turkish politician, one of the first women parliament members of Turkey
- Sarkis Jebejian (1864–1920), Armenian military leader, the head of the self-defense of Hadjin
- Metin Kaçan (1961–2013), Turkish writer of Ağır Roman
- Pavlos Karolidis (1849–1930), Greek historian
- Teodor Kasap (1835–1897), Ottoman-Greek newspaper editor and educator
- Elia Kazan (1909–2003), American film director, producer and co-founder of Actors Studio
- İhsan Ketin (1914–1995), Turkish geologist
- Hagop Kevorkian (1872–1962), Armenian-American archeologist, connoisseur of art, and collector
- Muhammad Khashoggi (1889–1978), Saudi physician, King Abdulaziz Al Saud's personal physician, father of Adnan Khashoggi
- Edgar Manas (1875–1964), Turkish-Armenian composer of the Turkish National Anthem, member of the Manas family
- Ziya Müezzinoğlu (1919–2020), diplomat and former Turkish Minister of Finance, Minister of Commerce
- Aristotle Onassis (1906–1975), Greek business magnate
- Hüsamettin Özkan (born 1950), Turkish politician, former Deputy Prime Minister of Turkey
- Hüsnü Özyeğin (born 1944), Turkish businessman, founder of Finansbank and Özyeğin University
- Nahapet Rusinian (1819-1876), Armenian poet, publicist, physician, orator, writer, political activist, translator, and contributor to the Armenian National Constitution
- Hacı Ömer Sabancı (1906–1966), Turkish businessperson and founder of Sabancı Holding
- Sakıp Sabancı (1933–2004), Turkish industrialist in former CEO of Sabancı Holding and founder of Sabancı University
- Güler Sabancı (born 1955), Turkish businesswoman and CEO of Sabancı Holding
- Mimar Sinan (1488–1588), the chief Ottoman architect for Suleiman the Magnificent, Selim II and Murad III
- Şule Yüksel Şenler (1938–2019), Turkish Islamist women writer, poet, senarist and Islamic democracy activist
- Nazım Terzioğlu (1912–1976), Turkish mathematician
- Tosun Terzioğlu (1942–2016), Turkish mathematician and former president of Sabancı University
- Mehmet Topuz (born 1983), Turkish footballer
- Mehmet Tüm (born 1957), Turkish politician from the Republican People's Party (CHP) who currently serves as a MP for Balıkesir
- Alparslan Türkeş (1917–1997), Turkish soldier and politician in founder of Nationalist Movement Party in ideology Idealism
- Tuğrul Türkeş (born 1954), Turkish economist, academic and politician in founder of Bright Turkey Party
- Abidin Ünal (born 1953), former commander of the Turkish Air Force and senior member of the NATO STARNET
- Murat Ünalmış (born 1981), Turkish actor

== Kayseri metropolitan municipality mayors ==
- 1984 – 1989 Hüsamettin Çetinbulut (ANAP)
- 1989 – 1994 Niyazi Bahçecioğlu (SHP)
- 1994 – 1998 Şükrü Karatepe (Welfare Party, Virtue Party)
- 1998 – 2014 Mehmet Özhaseki (Virtue Party, AK Party)
- 2014 – 2019 Mustafa Çelik (AK Party)
- 2019 – Memduh Büyükkılıç (AK Party)

== Twin towns ==
Kayseri is twinned with:

- Krefeld, Germany
- Maroua, Cameroon
- Miskolc, Hungary
- Homs, Syria
- Mostar, Bosnia and Herzegovina
- Nalchik, Russia
- Pavlodar, Kazakhstan
- Saarbrücken (district), Germany
- Shusha, Azerbaijan
- Yongin, South Korea

== See also ==
- Anatolian Tigers
- List of largest cities and towns in Turkey
