= Üsküdar American Academy =

- Üsküdar Amerikan Lisesi
- Istanbul; Turkey

Information
- Type: Private school
- Established: Historical: September 1, 1873; 153 years ago Official charter: 1876; 150 years ago Reestablishment in Üsküdar: September 15, 1921; 105 years ago
- Founder: American Board of Commissioners for Foreign Missions
- Oversight: Health and Education Foundation
- Principal: Ayşe Hillhouse
- Head of School: Cory Carson
- Grades: Prep, 9–12
- Gender: Co-educational
- Enrollment: 900
- Campus: 18,000 m² (Urban)
- Student Union/Association: UAA Student Association
- Colors: Blue and white
- Nickname: Tigers
- Rival: Robert College
- Accreditation: MEB, CIS, IB
- Yearbook: Memoranda
- Website: uaa.k12.tr

Üsküdar American Academy (Turkish: Üsküdar Amerikan Lisesi, pronounced [ys.cyd.aɾ a.me.ɾi.kan li.se.si]), often abbreviated as UAA or commonly referred to as Üsküdar Amerikan in Turkish, is a highly selective, coeducational, private high school located in the Üsküdar district of Istanbul, Turkey.

Founded in 1873 during the reign of Sultan Abdülaziz by the American Board of Commissioners for Foreign Missions (ABCFM) and officially recognized by the Ottoman government in 1876, it is among the oldest continuously operating educational institutions in Turkey. It is also among the oldest American-founded educational institutions outside the United States still in existence today. Originally established in Bahçecik, the Academy has operated on its current campus in Bağlarbaşı, Üsküdar since 1921.

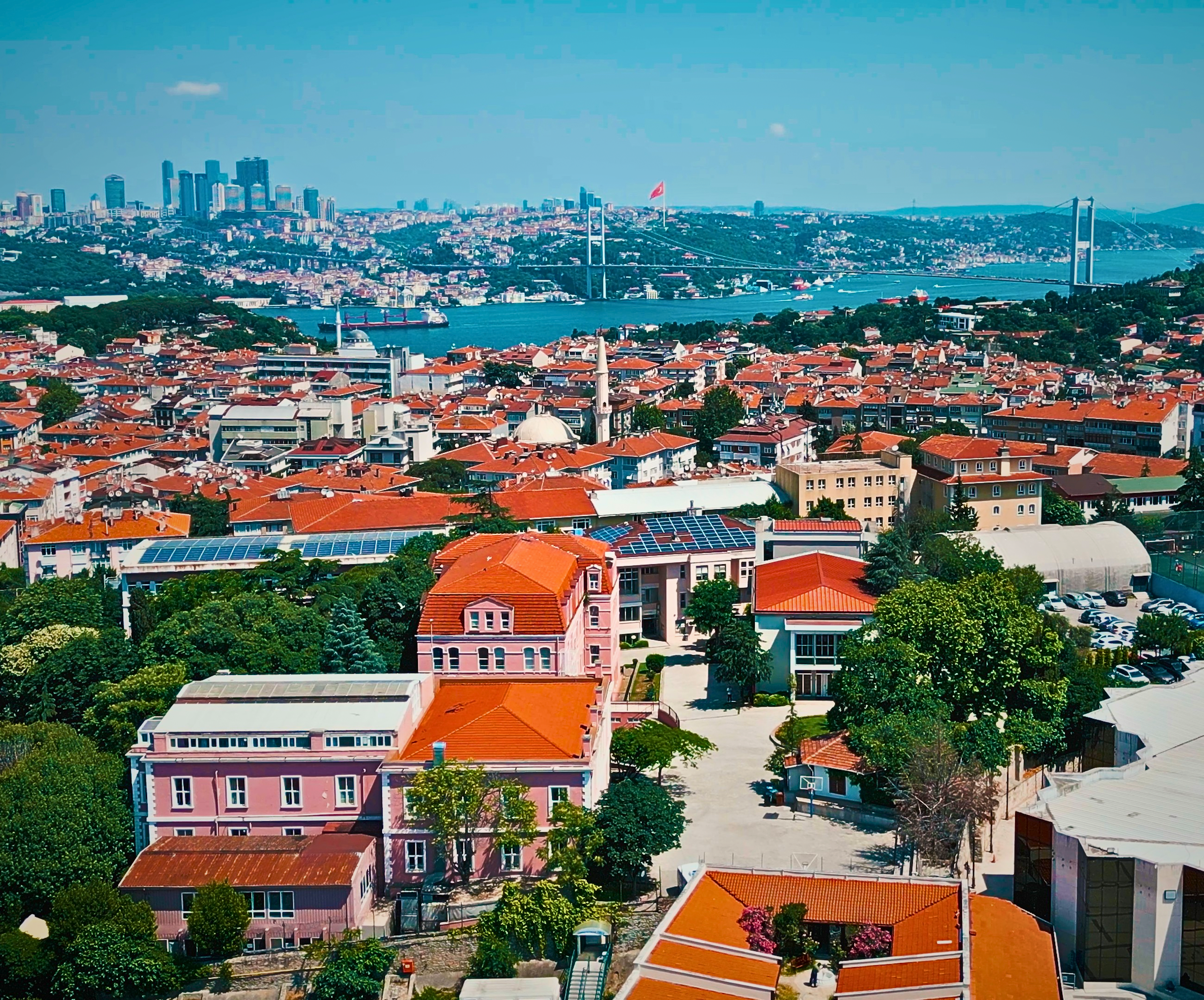
Üsküdar American Academy campus aerial view, 2023.

UAA is considered one of the most prestigious private schools in Turkey. From the late Ottoman era through the Republican period, UAA has produced generations of alumni who have played prominent roles in the arts, sciences, academia, politics, civil society, and business. Admission is highly competitive—typically limited to students from the top ~1% of the national entrance exam. The school operates fully under the regulations of the Turkish Ministry of National Education. It is also accredited by the Council of International Schools (CIS) and offers both the International Baccalaureate (IB) Diploma Programme and selected Advanced Placement (AP) courses. UAA graduates regularly continue their studies at Ivy League and other top-ranked universities abroad—including Harvard, Yale, Princeton, and MIT—as well as leading Turkish universities such as Boğaziçi University, Koç University, Sabancı University, and Istanbul Technical University.

== Background and origins of American schools in Turkey ==
=== Ottoman period ===
UAA is one of several Western institutions, including schools, hospitals, and printing houses—founded in the Ottoman Empire during the Tanzimat era, a period of reform that sought to modernize the state along Western lines in administration, law, the military, and education.

Among roughly two dozen surviving educational institutions established during this era, about half were originally founded by Western missions—primarily American, French, German, Austrian, and Italian, while Ottoman imperial institutions such as Galatasaray Sultanî, and Darülfünun (later reorganized as Istanbul University) were re-developed under substantial Western influence.

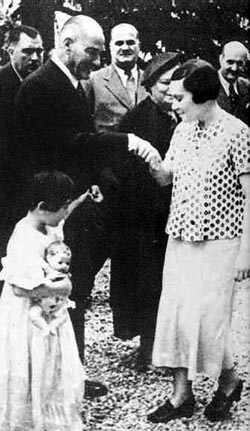
Mustafa Kemal Atatürk with his adopted daughters, Sabiha Gökçen (right) and Ülkü Adatepe (left), both of whom were students at Üsküdar American Academy.

The schools of the era played a transformative role in expanding access to education. Western institutions, initially aimed at non-Muslim students, developed within the more liberal environment established by the Islahat Edict of 1856, which sought to secure equal civil and legal rights as well as educational opportunities for non-Muslim subjects, and were later attended by Muslim students as well.

=== Republican period ===
With the founding of the modern Republic of Turkey, all foreign institutions—including the six American schools that survived—underwent secularization, transforming into key institutions that linked the Republic to the wider Western world with nationalized curricula in accordance with the republican principles and reforms of Mustafa Kemal Atatürk. The 32nd President of the United States, Franklin D. Roosevelt, and the founding president of the Republic of Turkey, Mustafa Kemal Atatürk, maintained a cordial relationship that reflected the growing diplomatic and economic ties between their countries. The warmth of diplomatic relations during this period and English, rapidly becoming an international lingua franca led to an interest in enrollment at American schools in Turkey.

Since 1971, including Üsküdar American Academy, four American schools remain active, alongside Boğaziçi University, which was originally founded as an American institution and later reorganized as a public university. American Collegiate Institute (ACI) and Tarsus American College (TAC) are sister institutions to UAA under the Health and Education Foundation (SEV), the non-profit trust that eventually succeeded the American Board in 2010.

== History ==
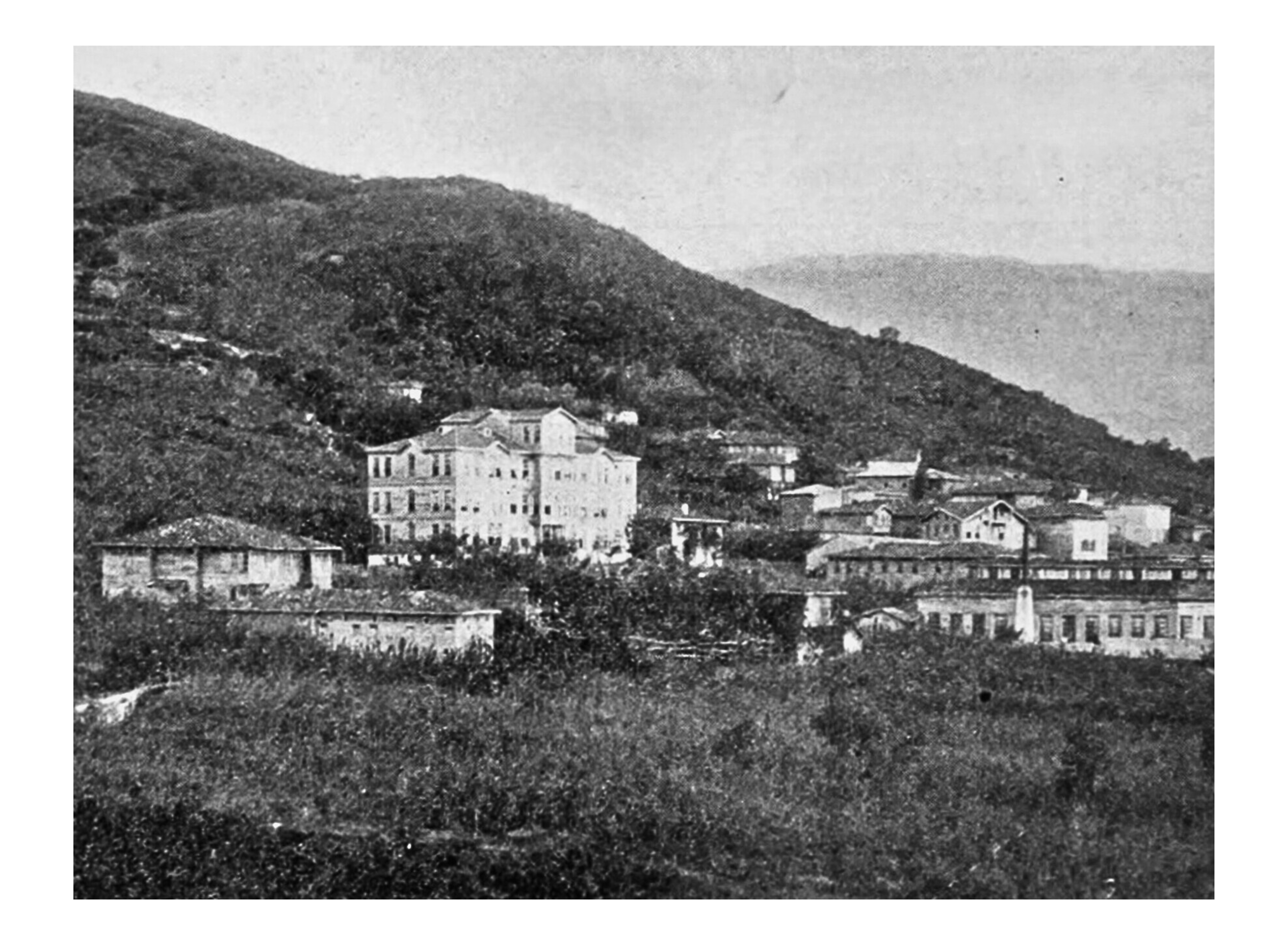
The American Girls’ Boarding School building, used between 1873 and 1885, seen on the right side of the second row, circa 1900 in Bahçecik.

=== Origins and Bahçecik period (1873–1885) ===
The Academy was established by the American Board of Commissioners for Foreign Missions (ABCFM), as the American Girls' Boarding School and began instruction in September 1873 in the coastal town of Bahçecik, located three miles from the Gulf of Izmit (historically known as Nicomedia), a neighboring city to Istanbul. The district was ethnically diverse, home to Muslim Turks, Greeks, Armenians and Circassians of various religious denominations. Housed in a converted silkworm cocoonery; the school offered instruction in languages, mathematics, history, geography, music, religion, physical education and domestic skills such as sewing.

The institution received its official recognition from Ottoman authorities in 1876.

The original school building was demolished around 1902, and no physical trace of it is known to exists today.

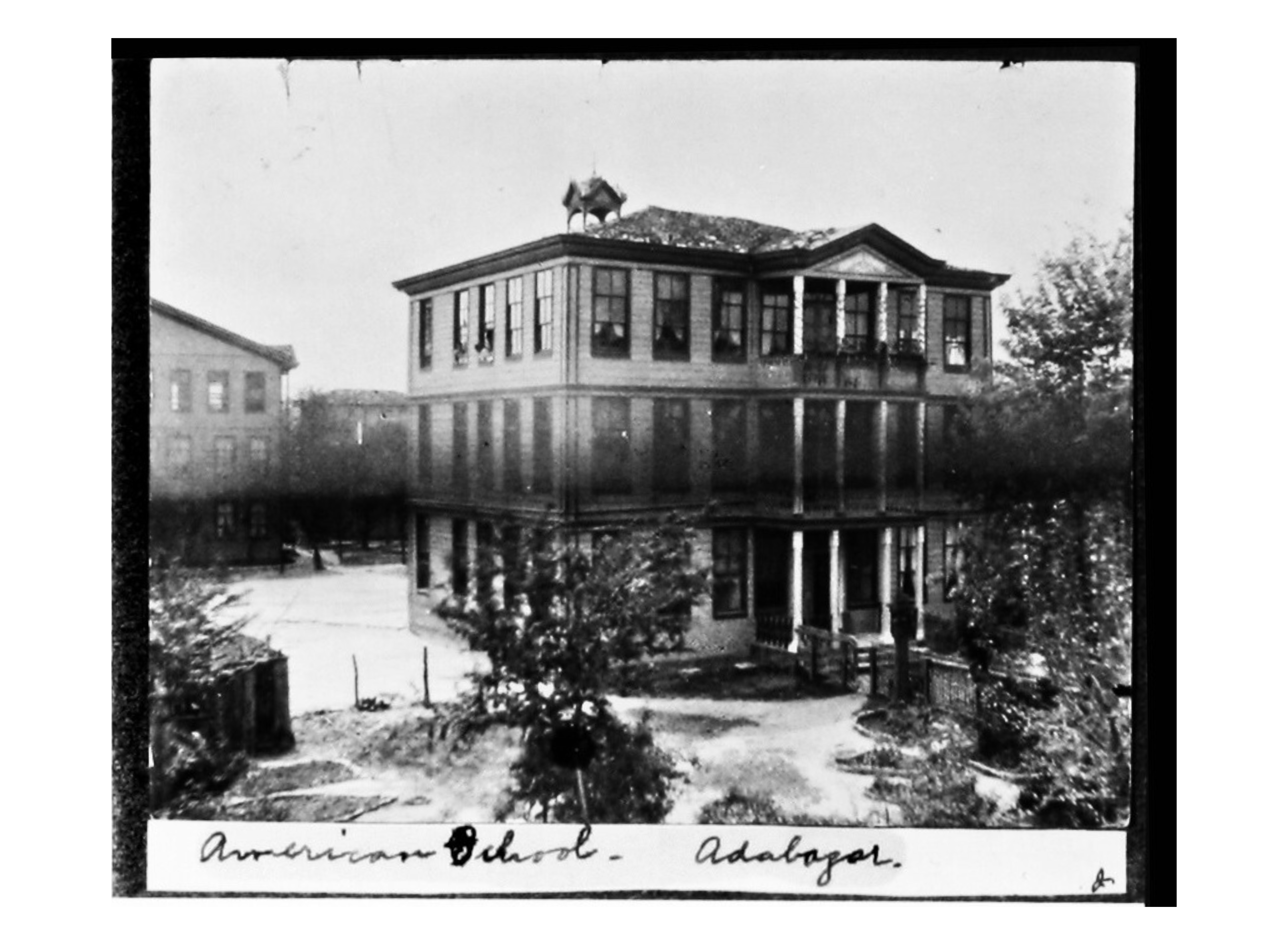
Alexander Hall, circa 1900s, with the caption reading "American School Adabazar"

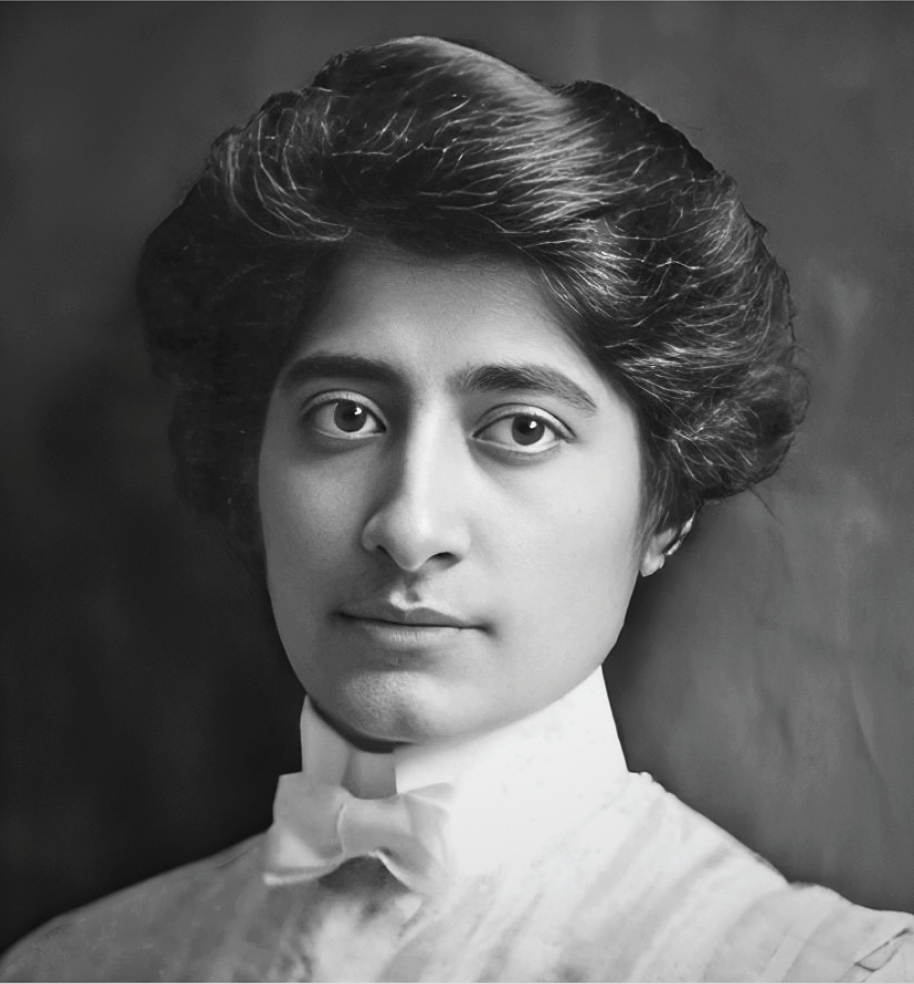
Dr. Zaruhi Kavaljian (Class of 1898), first female physician of the Ottoman Empire.

=== Adapazarı period (1885–1921) ===
As the school became well known in the region, it received an invitation from a local board of trustees in Adapazarı, a city with a larger community and resources, about 50 miles from Bahçecik and 90 miles from Istanbul, to relocate its operations. In 1885 the school was transferred to Adapazarı, where it began instruction on September 9, 1885 as the American School, Adabazar, in a new three-story building provided by the trustees. The government granted the school an official operating permit in 1886, making it the first American Board institution in the country to be managed primarily by local administrators, with the Board providing American teachers and scholarships while finances and governance largely in the hands of the Adapazarı trustees. English held a central place, with students required to use it in daily communication. Government officials attended commencement ceremonies, including representatives of the governor and the armed forces, with Turkish dignitaries delivering complimentary speeches as part of the event.

The school continued to establish its academic reputation, a notable example being Zaruhi Kavaljian (Class of 1898), who went on to study medicine at the University of Illinois College of Medicine and became the first female physician of the Ottoman Empire.

In 1915, the school buildings were requisitioned by the Ottoman Army and converted into a military hospital. School reopened in 1918. In the spring of 1921 it moved briefly to İzmit, and later that summer to Üsküdar, Istanbul.

=== Origins of the Üsküdar campus ===
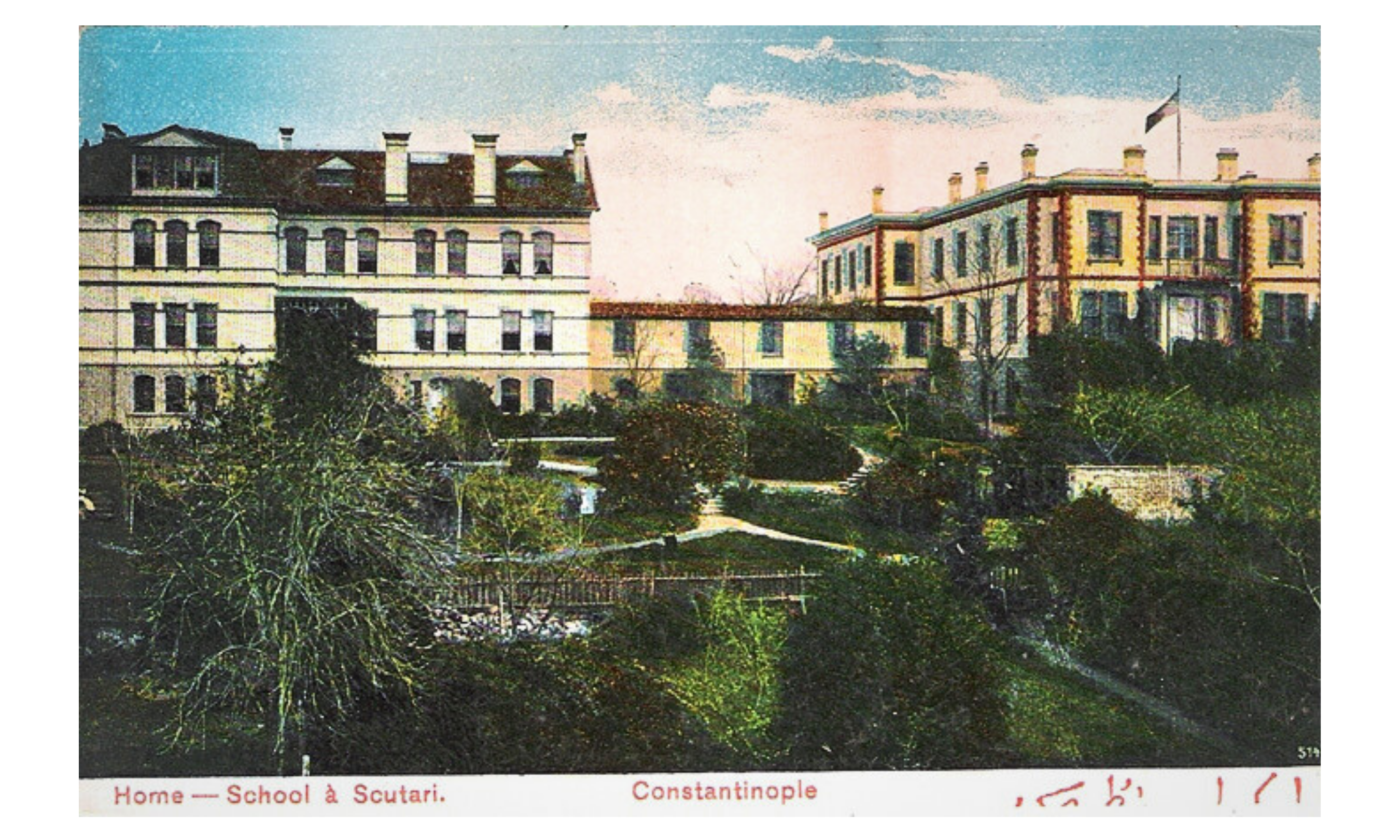
Üsküdar campus in the early 20th century, with Barton Hall (left) and Bowker Hall (right)

The Üsküdar campus had originally been built for the American College for Girls (ACG), also known as the Home School or Constantinople Home, later the girls’ section of Robert College. Founded in 1871 on Istanbul's historic peninsula, ACG moved to its permanent Üsküdar campus in 1876, when Bowker Hall was completed, followed by Barton Hall in 1883 and the Round House around 1890, in addition to a stable, which is now known as Kinney Cottage.

For nearly four decades (1876–1913), the Üsküdar campus served as ACG's home until the college transferred to a new site in Arnavutköy in 1913 (today the campus of Robert College).

=== Major Events ===
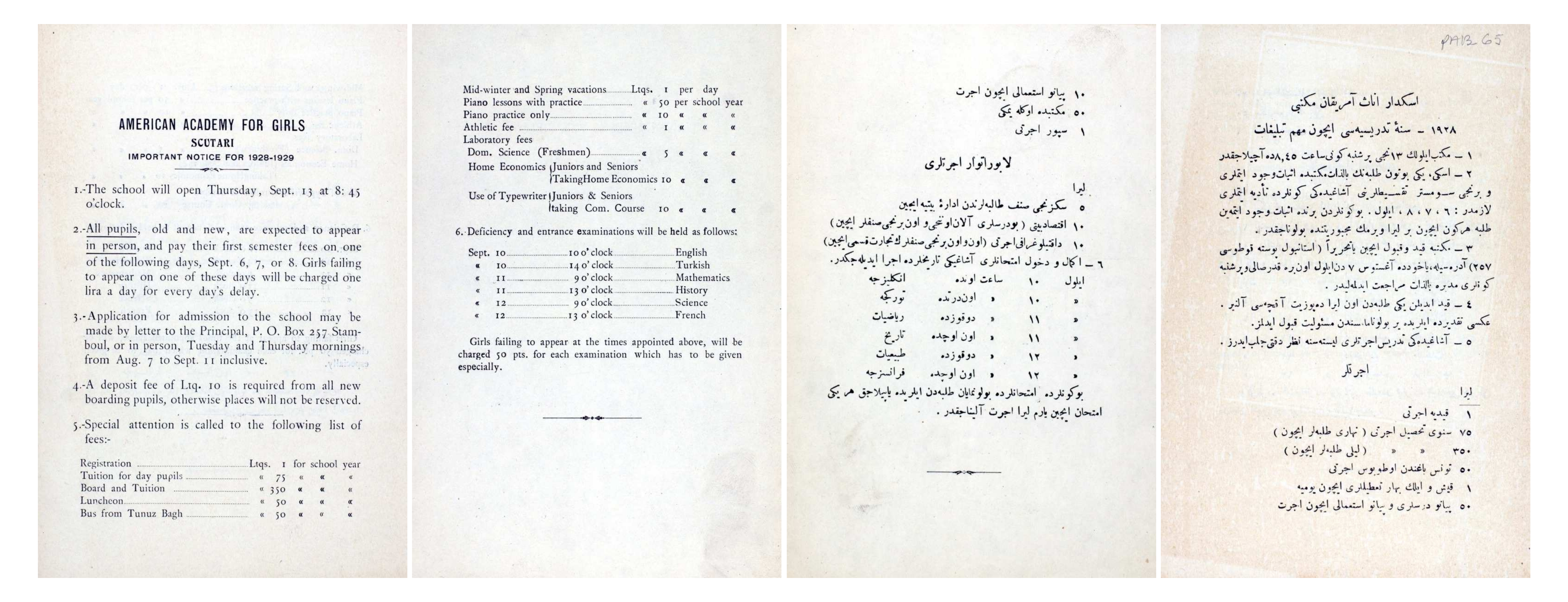
Bilingual English–Ottoman Turkish enrollment and fee notice issued by the Academy for the 1928–1929 academic year

- 1873 – The American Girls’ Boarding School was established by the American Board in the village of Bahçecik, Başiskele.
- 1876 – The school received its official charter from the Ottoman authorities.
- 1876 – The Üsküdar campus opened with the completion of Bowker Hall for the American College for Girls, which later became the girl’s section of Robert College.
- 1883 – Barton Hall was completed on the Üsküdar campus, expanding the facilities of the American College for Girls.
- 1885 – The American Girls’ Boarding School in Bahçecik accepted an invitation from a local board of trustees and relocated to Pazarcık, Adapazarı, where it expanded its operations on a new campus and became known as the American School Adabazar.
- 1914 – The American College for Girls relocated from the Üsküdar campus to a newly built campus in Arnavutköy, on the European side of Istanbul.
- 1915 – During World War I, the Adapazarı campus was requisitioned by the Ottoman Army for use as a military hospital, and the school remained closed until 1918.

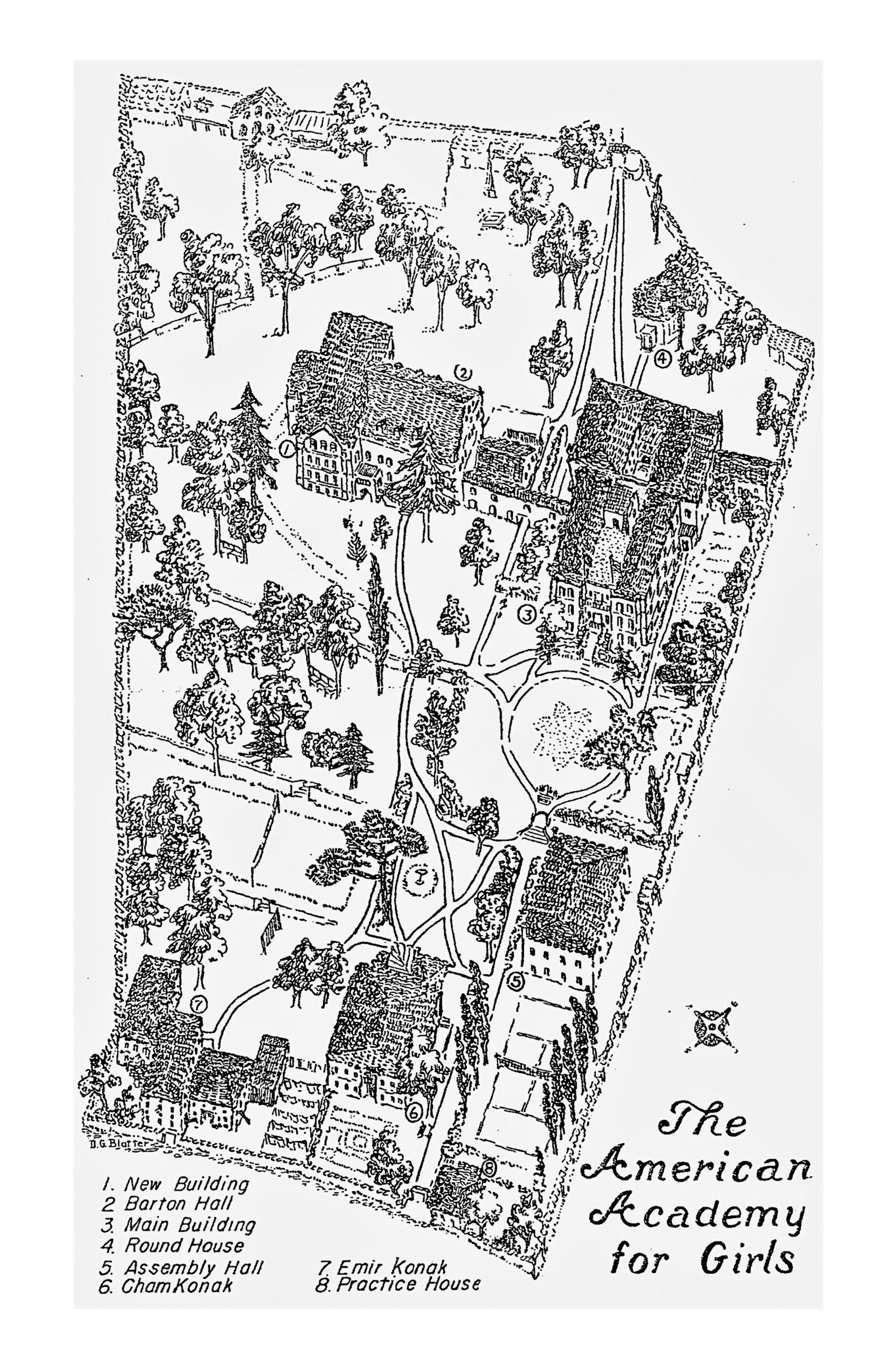
Üsküdar American Academy campus map, circa 1920s

- 1921 – The American Board relocated the American School Adabazar to the former American College for Girls campus in Üsküdar, where it reopened on 15 September 1921 as the American School for Girls.
- 1922 – May Day was celebrated for the first time on the Üsküdar campus.
- 1926 – The Turkish Ministry of Education officially recognized the school as the American Academy for Girls (AAG), and granted it lycée (high-school) status.
- 1935 – The Student Association was established under the name Turkish Society.
- 1936 – Jessie E. Martin (1892–1980) (Oberlin College B.A., 1915) began her twenty-year tenure as principal of the academy.
- 1947 – Barton Hall was fully restored, providing the academy with its first modern science laboratories, a gymnasium, and a large library.
- 1950 – Çalıdere Cottage, also known as Dorothy House, was built on the campus by art teacher and author Dorothy Blatter.
- 1951 – The academy published the first edition of its yearbook, Memoranda.
- 1952 – The Alumni Association was established.
- 1955 – Martin Hall was completed as the academy’s main classroom and dormitory building, with support from the Ford Foundation.
- 1956 – Helen Louise Morgan (1912–2004) (University of Chicago B.A., 1934; M.A., 1936) began her twenty-one-year tenure as principal of the academy.
- 1956 – The old barn on the campus was converted into Kinney Cottage for use as the Practice House and named in honor of former principal Mary Kinney.
- 1958 – Huntington Hall was constructed as the academy’s administrative center and auditorium.
- 1968 – The Health and Education Foundation (SEV) was established by graduates of Üsküdar American Academy, the American Collegiate Institute, Tarsus American College, and Talas American College.
- 1973 – Principal Helen L. Morgan represented the academy at the opening of the Bosphorus Bridge, having been invited by the Turkish government in recognition of her role as an educational leader.
- 1976 – The academy ranked among Turkey’s top ten high schools in the national university entrance examinations and first among girls’ schools.
- 1986 – Friends of the American Board Schools in Turkey (FABSIT) was established in the United States to help raise funds for the American Board schools in Turkey.
- 1989 – The academy was recognized as one of Turkey’s top two high schools based on its performance in the Turkish national university entrance examinations.
- 1990 – The academy admitted its first cohort of boys, becoming co-educational, and adopted the name Üsküdar American Academy.
- 1992 – The Sabancı Sports Hall was completed with the support of the Hacı Ömer Sabancı Foundation; its groundbreaking was attended by Minister of National Education Avni Akyol, and it was inaugurated by his successor, Köksal Toptan.
- 1994 – The Turkish International Model United Nations (TIMUN) conference was established at Üsküdar American Academy, becoming Turkey’s first Model United Nations conference for high-school students.
- 1994 – Morgan Hall, the academy’s Science and Mathematics Building, was completed with support from USAID/ASHA and dedicated in honor of former principal Helen L. Morgan, who jointly inaugurated the building with Minister of National Education Nevzat Ayaz.
- 1997 – Following the adoption of eight-year compulsory primary education in Turkey, the academy ceased admitting students to its middle school section.
- 2007 – The academy was accredited by the Council of International Schools (CIS).
- 2010 – The transition from the American Board to the alumni-founded Health and Education Foundation (SEV) was formally completed with the transfer of the schools’ foundership to SEV.

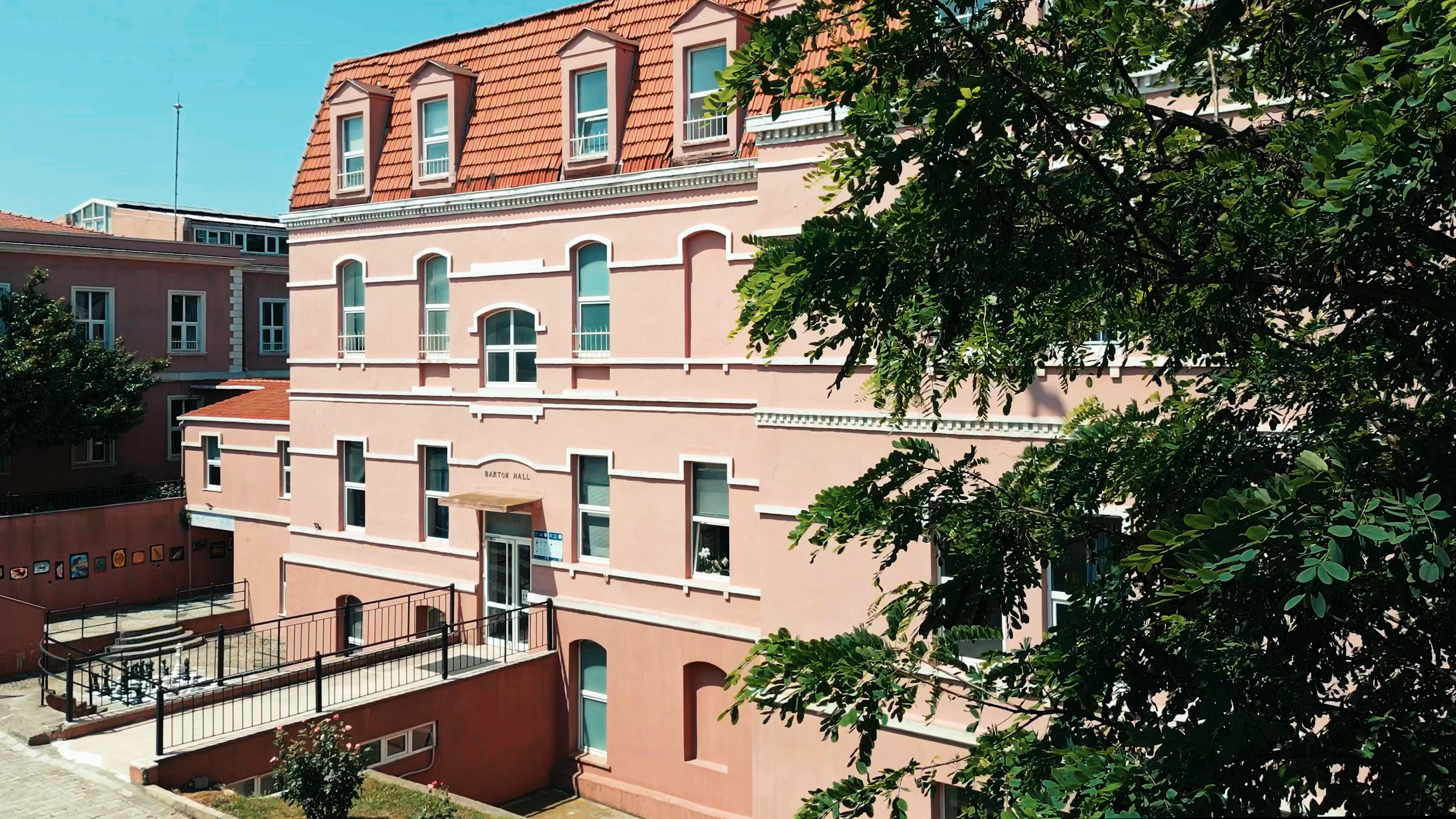
Barton Hall in 2023

- 2014 – The academy was authorized to offer the International Baccalaureate Diploma Programme (IBDP), beginning with the 2014–2015 academic year.

== Academics ==
Üsküdar American Academy (UAA) is recognized as one of Turkey's most prestigious private high schools. Admission is highly competitive—typically limited to students who place within the top 1% on Turkey's nationwide exam, "Liselere Geçiş Sınavı" or LGS. In 2025, the cutoff was approximately 0.8% for boys (score: 480) and 1.1% for girls (score: 476), consistent with thresholds in previous years.

The school operates under the regulations of the Turkish Ministry of National Education while maintaining international standards of academic quality. UAA is accredited by the Council of International Schools (CIS) and offers both the International Baccalaureate (IB) Diploma Programme and selected Advanced Placement (AP) courses. These programs allow students to engage in university-level study across disciplines such as calculus, physics, chemistry, biology, and world history.

The Academy provides a curriculum taught primarily in English, alongside Turkish courses included under Ministry standards and guidelines. French, German, and Spanish are also offered as foreign languages. Beyond core academics, UAA distinguishes itself with electives and specialized courses, including IB Computer Science, Coding & Game Design, Advanced Coding & Game Design, Bioinformatics, Neuroscience, Modern Physics, Film Production & Cinema Studies, Music & Technology, 3D Modelling, and Design & Innovation Management. Co-curricular programs reinforce this focus: the Maker & Robotics Club engages students in robotics, electronics, programming, and AI.

== Arts & sports, traditions, and school culture ==
=== Athletics and the UAA Tigers ===
Üsküdar American Academy's athletic teams compete as the UAA Tigers, based at the Özdemir Sabancı Sports Hall. The tiger mascot—adopted in the 2000s—represents the school in competitive school leagues. The Academy's facilities include a modern sports hall, a fully equipped fitness center, outdoor basketball and tennis courts, and a soccer field. UAA Tigers compete in a wide range of sports, including Basketball, Volleyball, soccer, swimming, Tennis, Table tennis, Badminton, hockey, and Fencing, and have earned numerous championships and top placements—particularly in basketball and volleyball—as well as strong results in swimming, table tennis, and fencing at both city and national levels. In addition, UAA plays a central role in organizing athletic events within the SEV Schools network, most notably tournaments that bring together sister institutions ACI, TAC, and SAC.

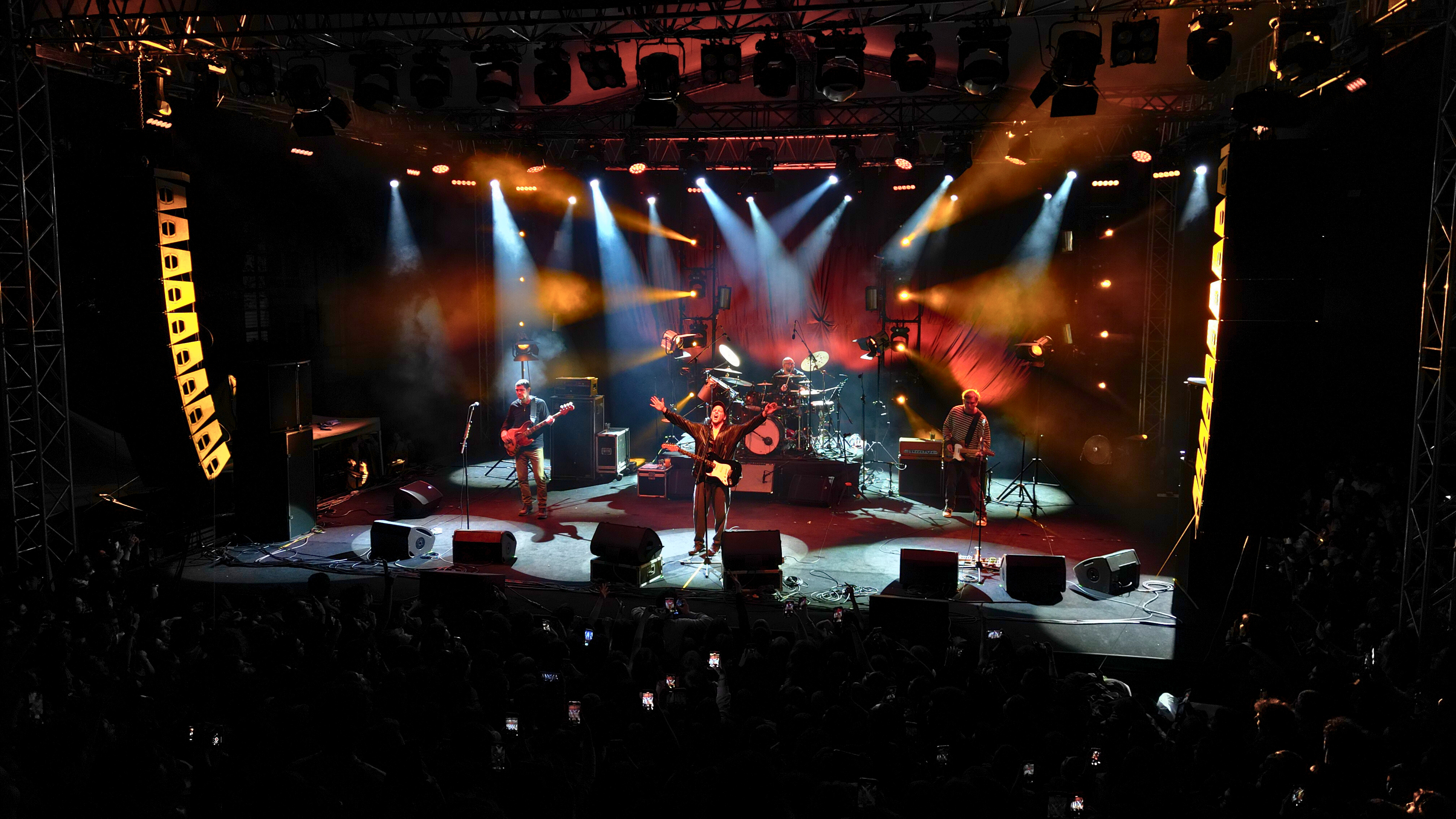
Renowned Turkish rock band Duman performing at the 100th MayDay Festival, Üsküdar American Academy, 2024.

=== MayDay ===
MayDay is one of Üsküdar American Academy's oldest and most cherished traditions, celebrated annually as a spring festival that brings together students, teachers, alumni, and families for a day of music, performances, and community. The festival, which marked its 101st edition in 2025, has featured renowned artists such as Duman, Mor ve Ötesi, and Teoman, alongside student and teacher bands, while the traditional Maypole dance has remained its signature highlight for more than a century. Organized largely by the Student Association, MayDay continues to stand as a vibrant symbol of the school's history and spirit.

=== TIMUN ===
The Üsküdar American Academy Model United Nations (MUN) program was first established in 1991, and UAA soon became a regular participant of The Hague International Model United Nations (THIMUN) in the Netherlands.

TIMUN (Turkish International Model United Nations), the Academy's international, student-run conference, was founded in 1994 and became the first high school MUN conference in Turkey. In 1996, TIMUN was affiliated by the THIMUN Board, becoming one of the first conferences to be affiliated worldwide and the first in all of Asia. Since then, UAA MUN club members have also served as Judges and Advocates in the International Court of Justice (ICJ), as well as Deputy Secretaries-General, chairs, co-chairs, and presidents in THIMUN conferences abroad.

Over the years, notable guest speakers at TIMUN have included Kemal Derviş, Turkish Minister of Economy and Administrator of the United Nations Development Programme, Ecumenical Patriarch Bartholomew I alongside ambassadors, journalists, and leading figures in international relations. In 2024, TIMUN marked the 30th anniversary of its founding.

=== Serçe and Memoranda ===
Üsküdar American Academy publishes two long-standing student periodicals that showcase literary and creative expression. Serçe, a Turkish-language literary magazine produced by the school's Journalism Club, is issued twice annually and features student poetry, essays, short stories, and other original works, providing a platform for young writers to share their voices within the school community. Complementing this is Memoranda, the Academy's yearbook, which records each academic year through photographs, articles, and student reflections, documenting campus life, events, and traditions.

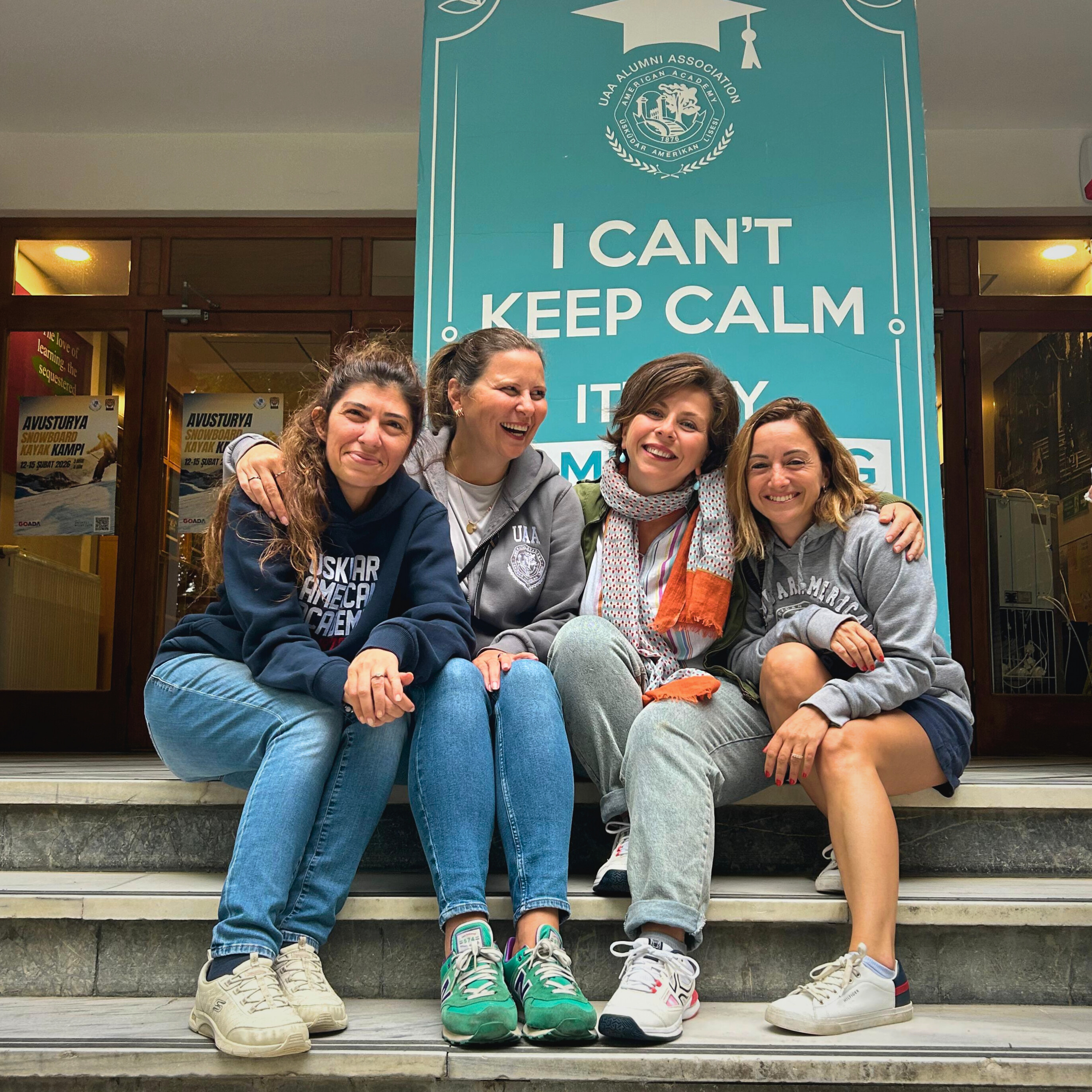
A group of alumni from the Class of 1999 at the steps of Martin Hall, Brownie Day, 2025.

=== UAA Alumni Association, Reunions, and Brownie Day ===
The UAA Alumni Association, founded in 1952, serves as the main body connecting graduates of Üsküdar American Academy with each other and with the school community. Based at Kinney Cottage on the campus, the Association oversees annual reunion gatherings for classes celebrating milestone anniversaries, offering opportunities for alumni to return and renew their ties to the Academy. It also organizes the annual Brownie Day, a long-standing tradition that brings together graduates, teachers, and families for a day of celebration. In addition, the Association sponsors outside events and social activities and plays an active role in fundraising to provide scholarships for current students.

== Campus ==
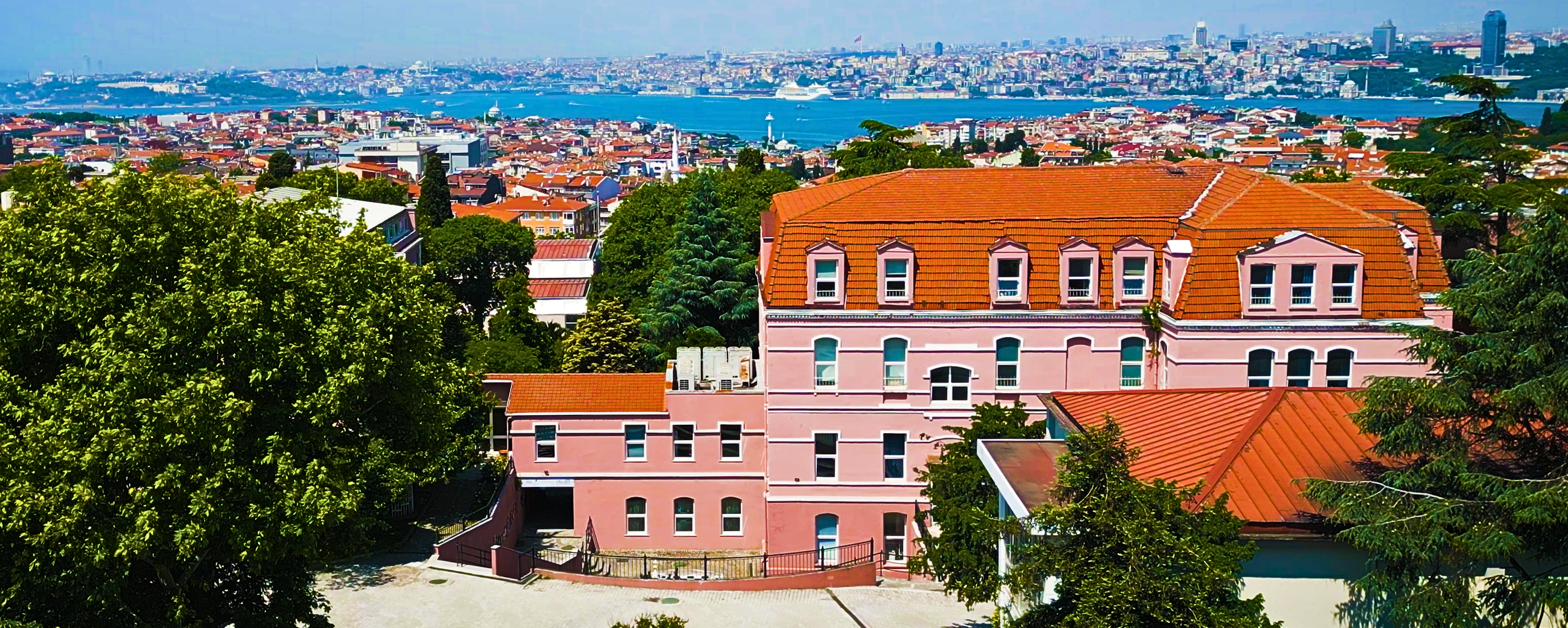
Barton Hall overlooking Üsküdar and the Bosphorus

Üsküdar American Academy campus is one of the oldest continuously used educational sites in Istanbul. Located on a hill in the residential district of Üsküdar, the campus covers 18,000 square meters and includes eight principal buildings.

=== Bowker Hall (1876) ===
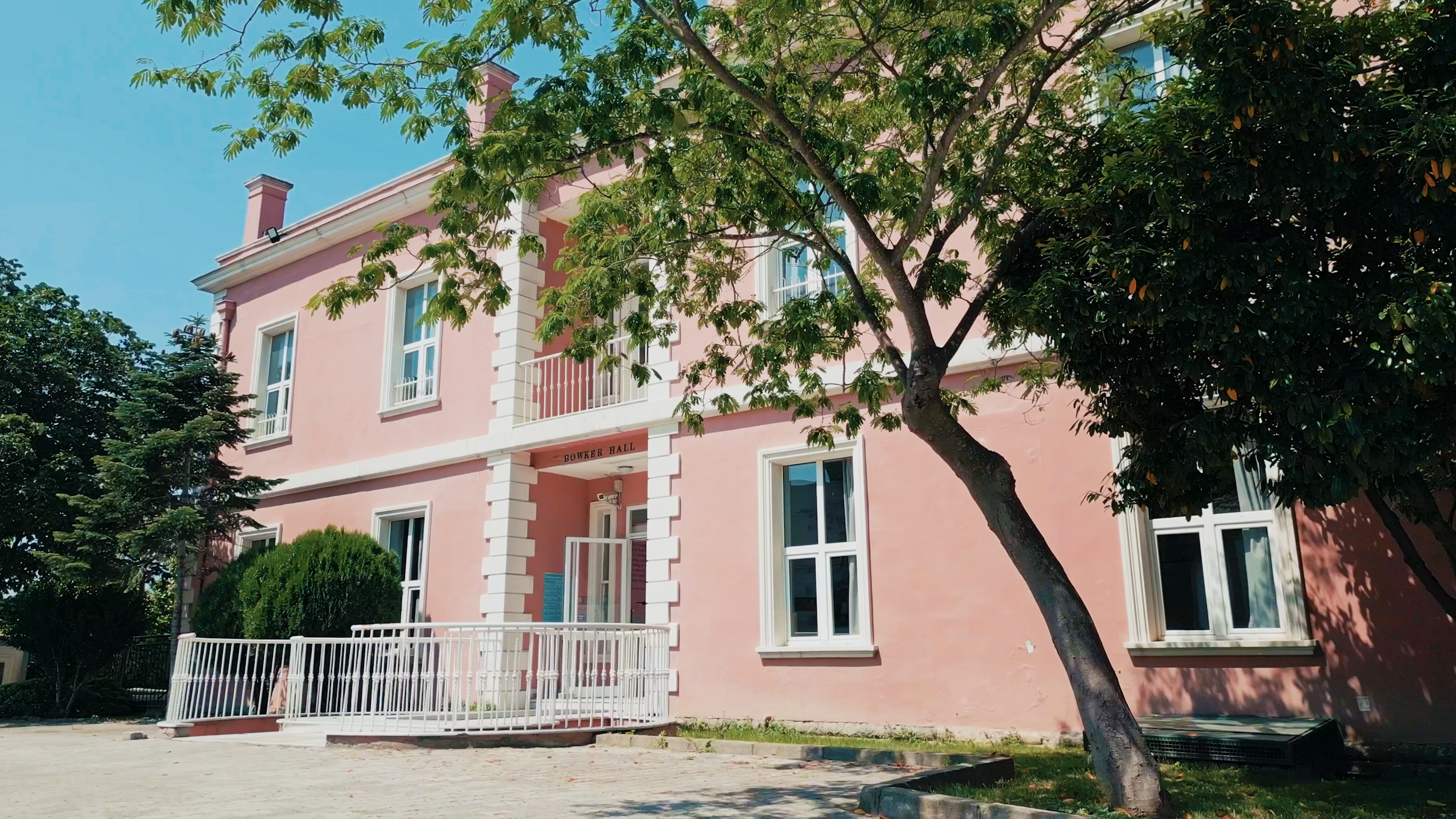
Bowker Hall, east façade on the Üsküdar American Academy campus

The first permanent campus building, Bowker Hall, was completed in 1876 and named in honor of Mrs. Albert Bowker, who helped raise the funds for its construction in Boston, Massachusetts. The three-storey stone building is built in a Victorian style combining New England colonial symmetry with late-Ottoman masonry craftsmanship with a distinctive double flight of steps leading to its western entrance.

Today, Bowker Hall houses the Turkish Language and Literature and Visual Arts departments, as well as the school dining hall. Its western gate, opening to Bowker Garden, has remained one of the campus's most recognizable architectural features and appears on the Academy's official insignia. The building has undergone several restorations, most recently in the late twentieth century.

=== Barton Hall (1883) ===
Barton Hall, completed in 1883, is the second major building constructed on the campus.

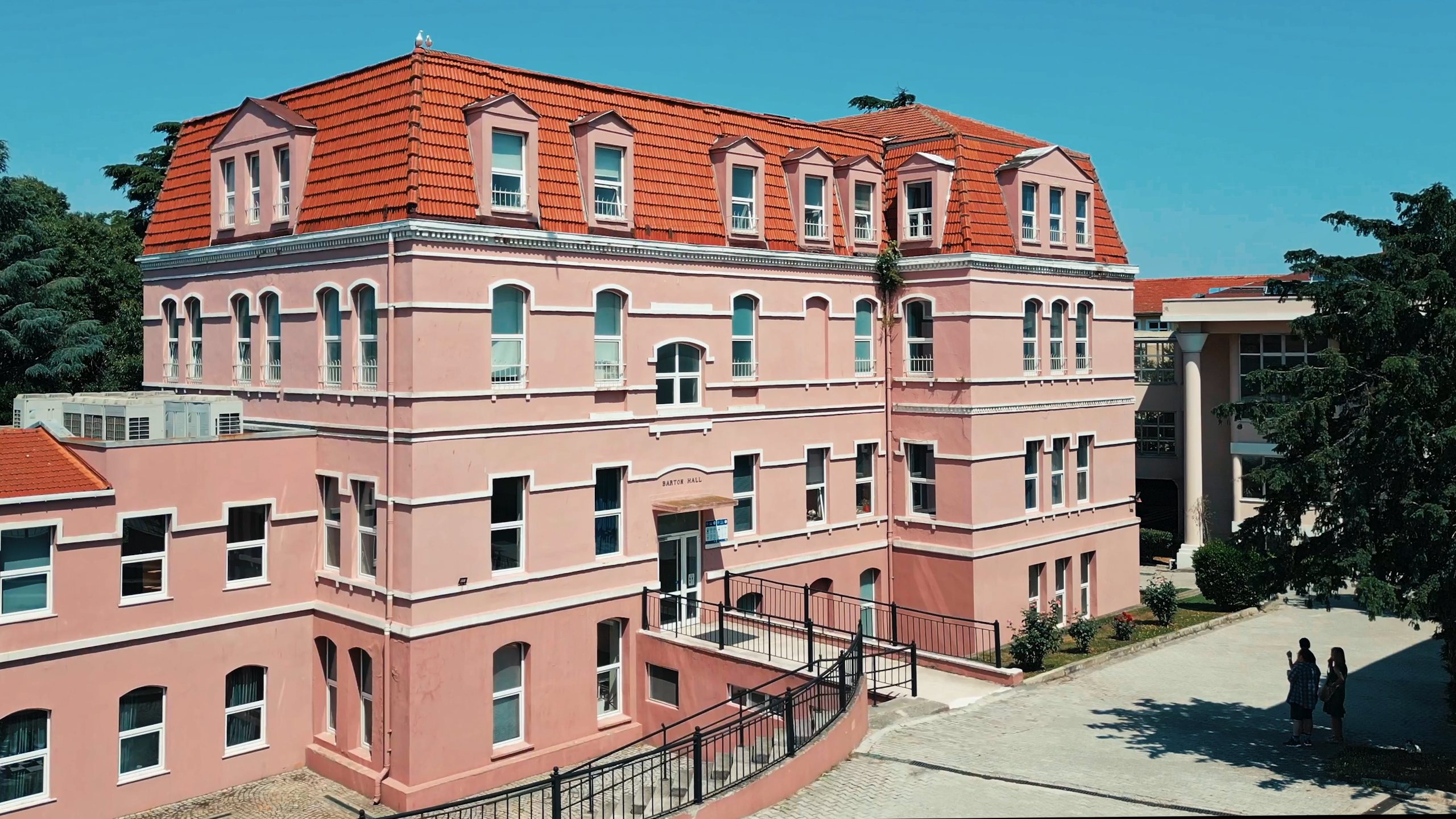
Barton Hall (1883), east façade; currently housing the English Department

It was named in honor of the Barton family, who provided funds for its construction. Built adjacent to Bowker Hall, the four-storey building is designed in a late Victorian eclectic style, featuring a French-inspired mansard roof with dormer windows, and is connected to Bowker Hall by a long interior corridor.

The building was severely damaged by a fire in 1905 during the ACG period and remained only partially functional for more than four decades. In 1946–47, under the direction of principal Jessie E. Martin, Barton Hall was fully restored. The renovation also provided the school with its first modern science laboratories, gymnasium, and a large library.

Today, Barton Hall serves as the home of Üsküdar American Academy's English Department.

=== Round House (1890s) ===
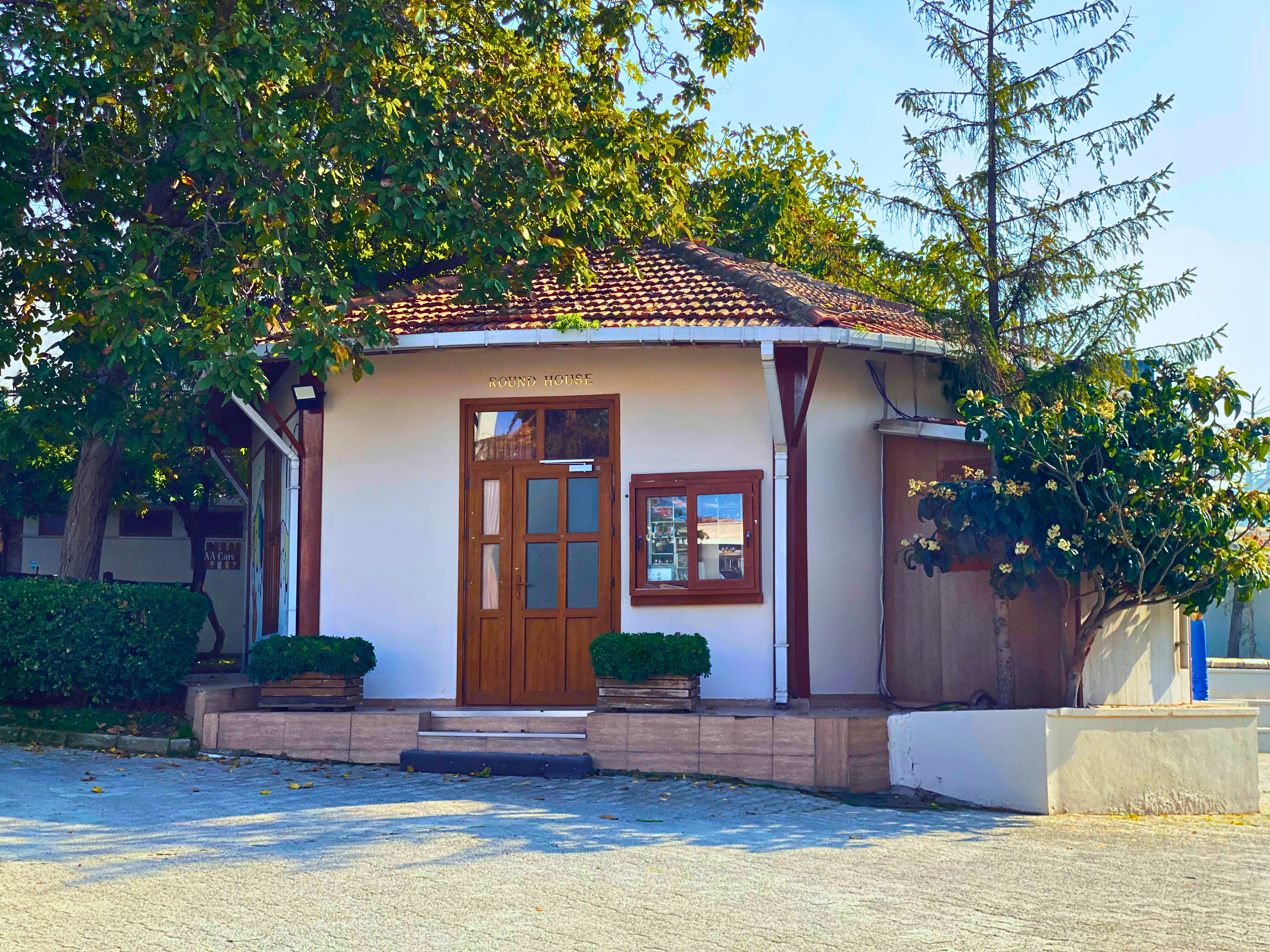
Round House, 2025

The Round House, a circular cottage built in the 1890s, was originally constructed as a dormitory and staff residence and has undergone several restorations since then.

Since the 1950s, it has served as the home of Üsküdar American Academy's Music Department.

=== Kinney Cottage (c. 1900s) ===
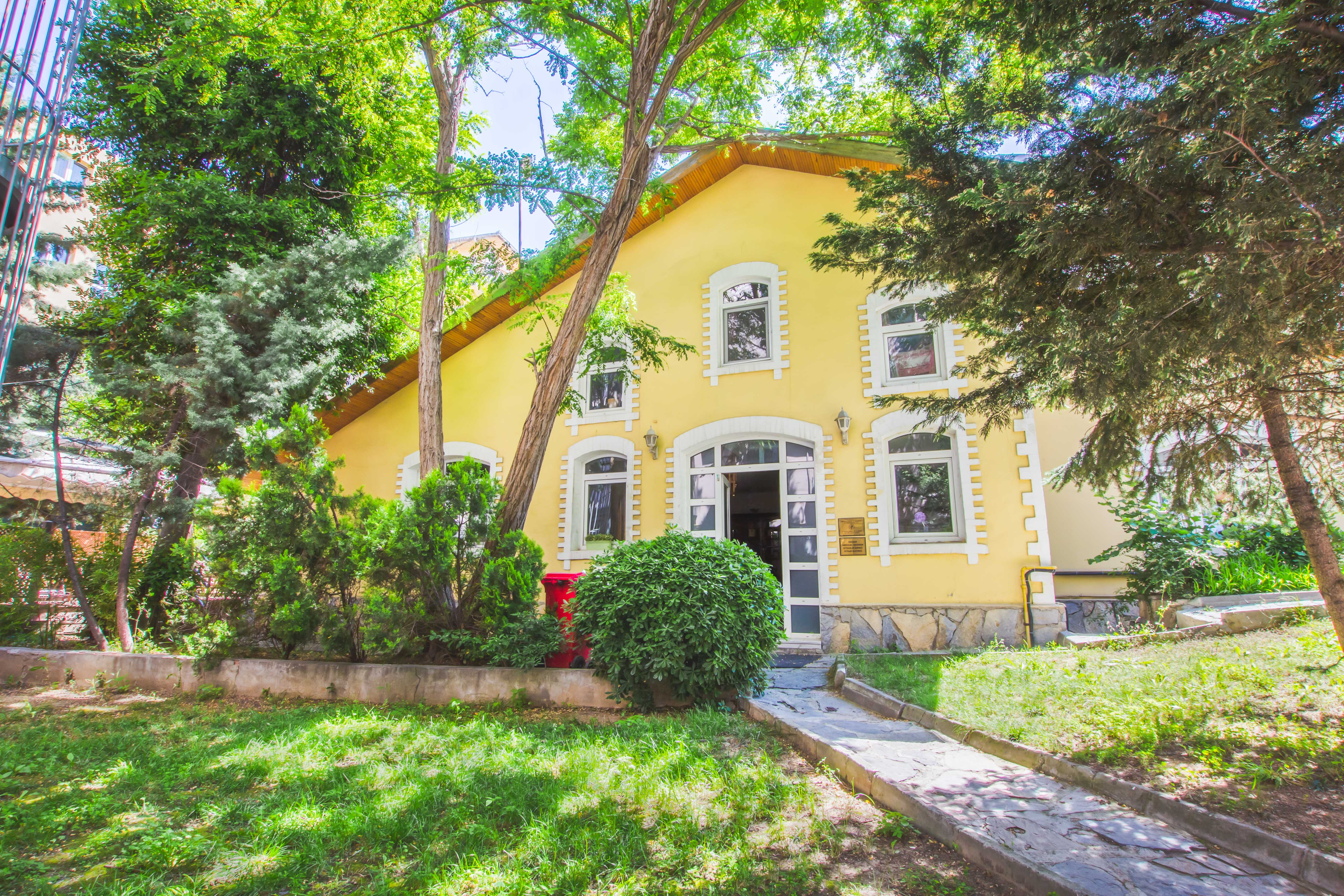
Kinney Cottage, currently used as the UAA Alumni Office

Built as a faculty residence and later named for Mary Kinney, the cottage was long used for homemaking and home economics courses, hence previously known as Practice House. It was restored in the 1990s and converted into the Alumni Center.

=== Emir Konak (1951) ===
A historic wooden structure that had stood on the campus since 1925, Emir Konak was fully restored in 1951 during Jessie Martin's administration. It was renovated again in the 1990s and now houses the computer center and the “Maker Lab,” a classroom equipped with 3D printers used by the school's Maker Club.

=== Martin Hall (1955) ===
Constructed during Helen Morgan's tenure and named in honor of her predecessor Jessie Martin (principal 1935–1950), Martin Hall was funded in part by the Ford Foundation and opened with a ceremony on 14 November 1955. Today, it houses the mathematics department as well as the Halide Edip Adıvar Library.

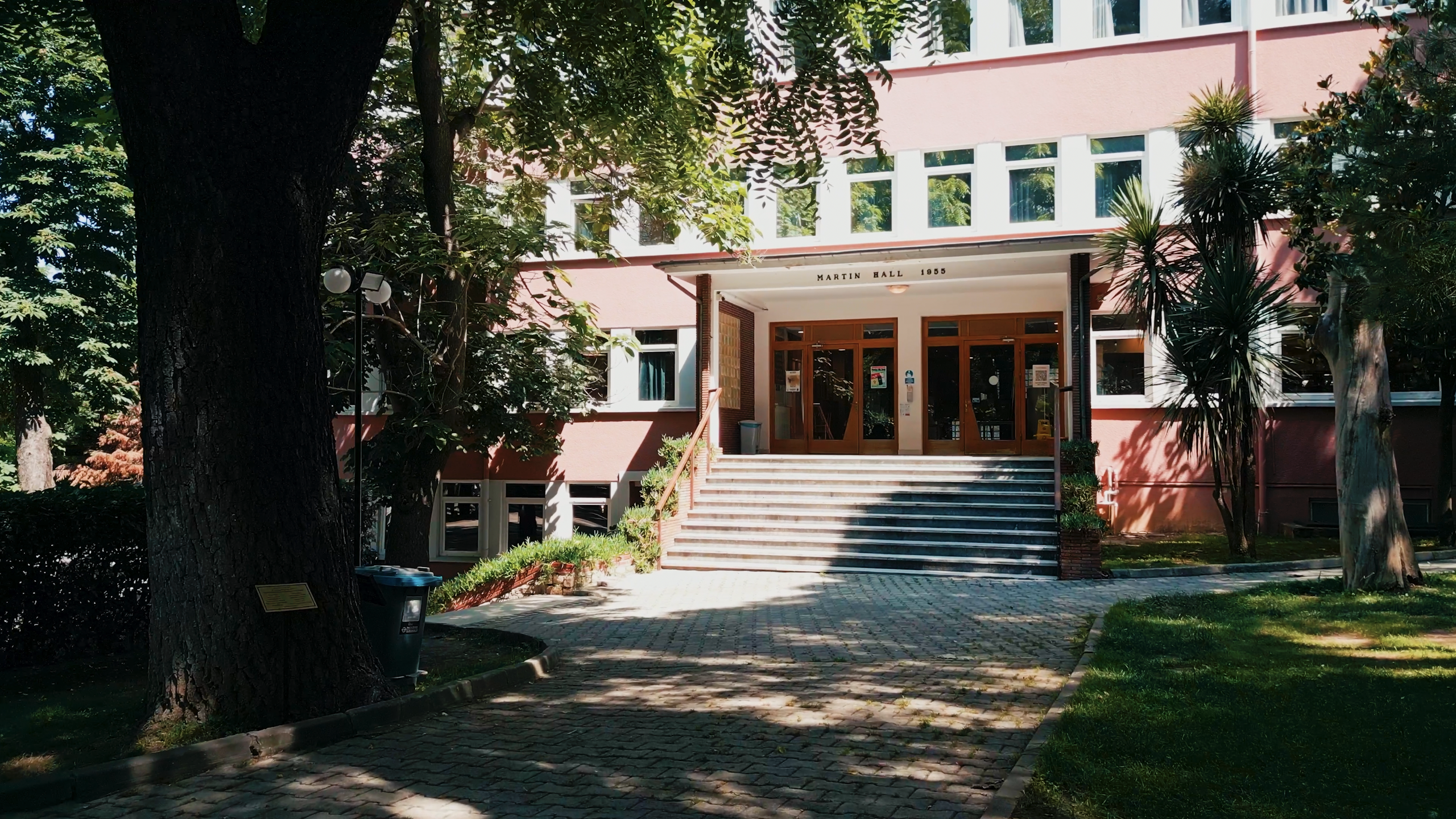
Martin Hall named in honor of Jessie Martin (principal 1935–1950)

The Halide Edip Adıvar Library is the main library of Üsküdar American Academy, named after the Turkish writer and Halide Edip Adıvar, an alumna of the Academy's predecessor, the American College for Girls, from which she graduated in 1901. It was established during a major campus renovation in 1946–47, when a large library was created in Barton Hall, and expanded significantly under Principal Helen Morgan between 1956 and 1977, growing from about 3,000 to nearly 10,000 volumes. Today, the library houses a collection of more than 22,000 print books, approximately 7,500 e-books, periodicals, and multiple academic database subscriptions, making it one of the best-equipped high school research facilities in Turkey. In addition to supporting the school's curriculum, it provides resources for student research, literacy, and interdisciplinary projects, with access both on-site and through digital platforms.

=== Huntington Hall (1958) ===
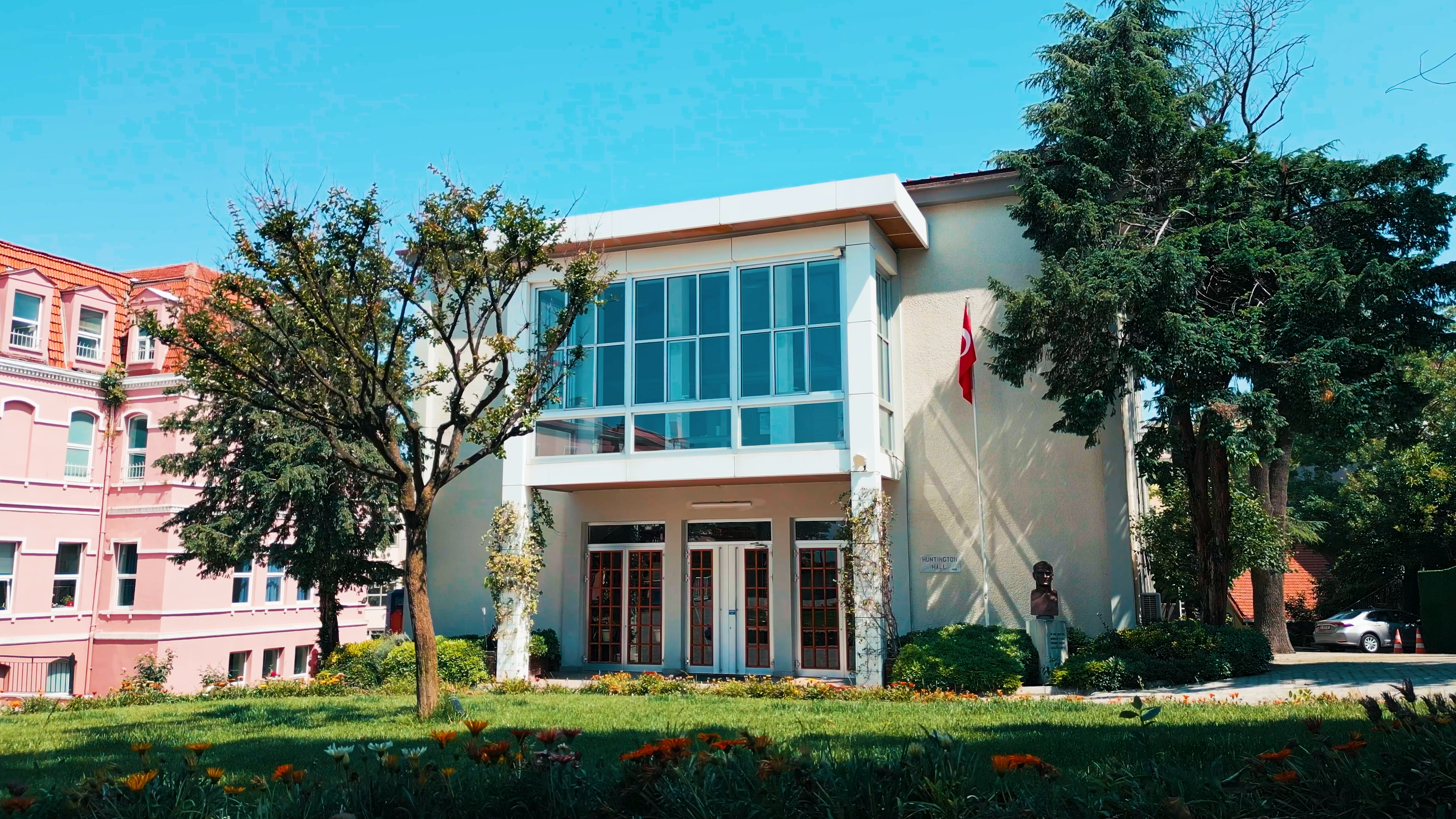
Huntington Hall (1958) on the Üsküdar American Academy campus (2023)

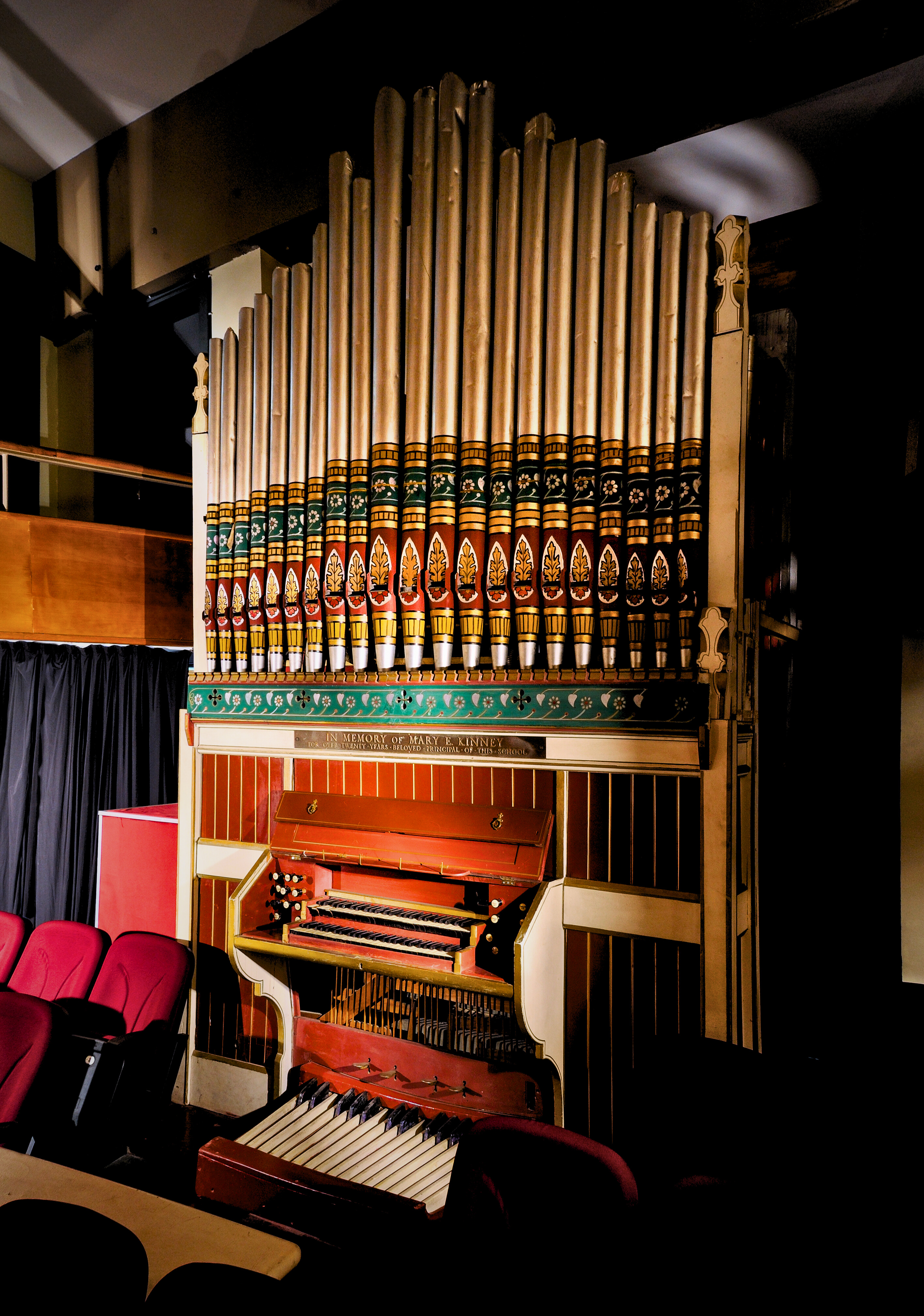
Pipe organ

Named after George Huntington, a professor at Robert College, this building serves as the school's administrative center. It also contains the auditorium, which houses a historic pipe organ dating from 1950, one of the few of its kind in Turkey. The organ was restored in 2022 by the UAA Alumni Association.

=== Özdemir Sabancı Sports Hall (1992) ===
Built with support from the Sabancı Foundation and named in memory of Özdemir Sabancı, a graduate of Tarsus American College, the hall is the school's main athletic facility. It includes a multi-use games area where basketball, volleyball, and kin-ball are played, along with table tennis and a fitness room.

=== Morgan Hall (1994) ===
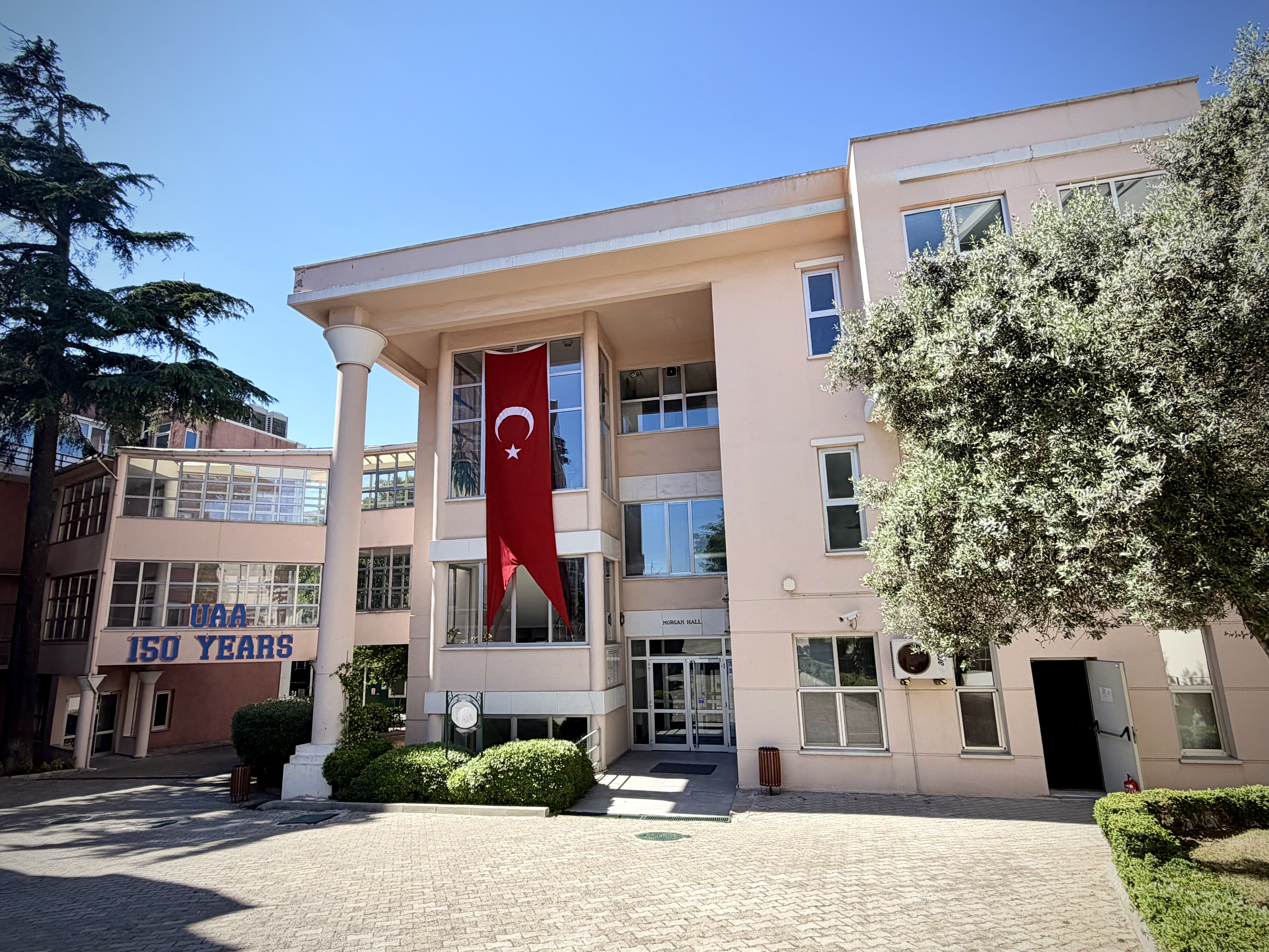
Üsküdar American Academy campus in 2026, featuring Morgan Hall (1994), home of the Science Department.

Dedicated to Helen Morgan (principal 1950–1977), this science building was constructed to house laboratories and the computer center. As of 2023, it accommodates the Physics, Chemistry, and Biology departments, along with the Redroom, a multipurpose mini-auditorium.

== Notable alumni and faculty ==
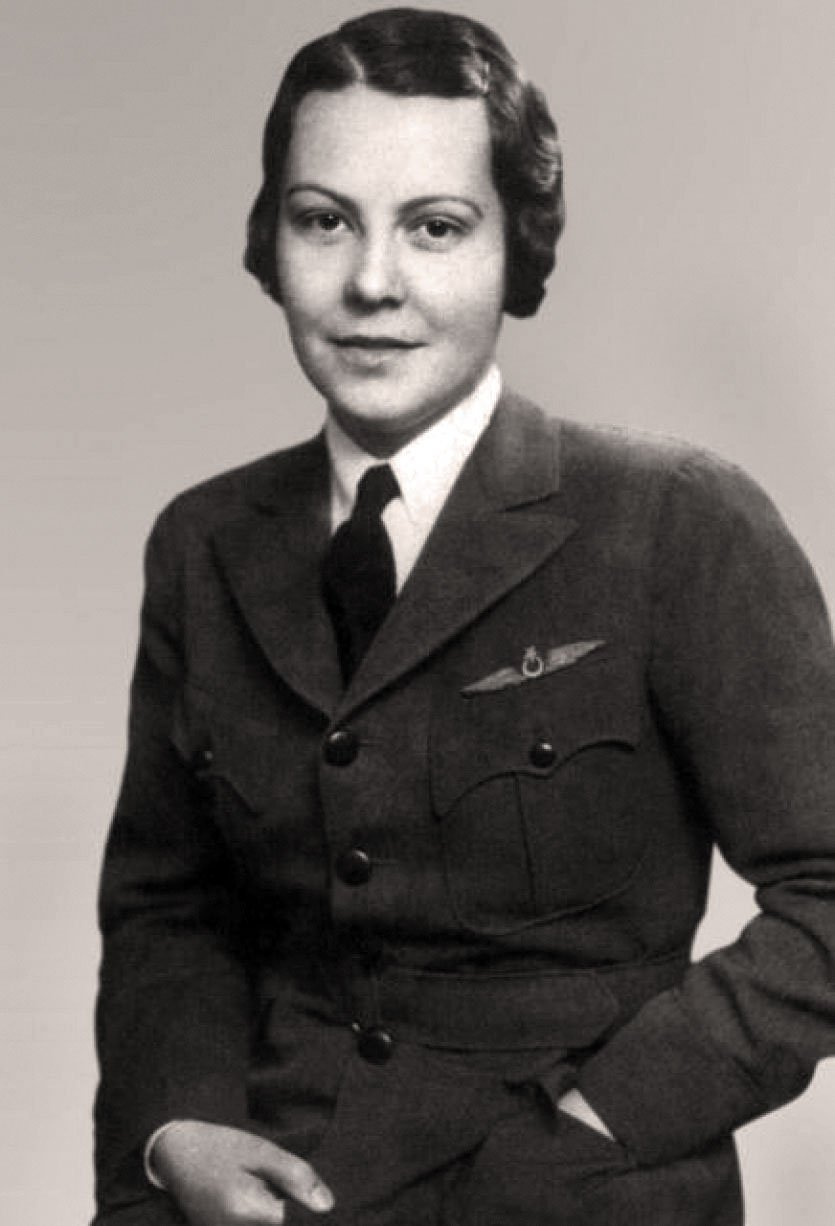
Sabiha Gökçen (1903–2001), pioneering aviator and the world's first female combat pilot

UAA alumni include Sabiha Gökçen, the first female fighter pilot in the world and namesake of Sabiha Gökçen International Airport; Dr. Zaruhi Kavaljian, the first woman doctor of the Ottoman Empire; Prof. Dr. Sevim Tekeli, the first female science historian of Turkey; Prof. Dr. Sabahat Tuluy Kaymakçalan, the first female cardiologist of Turkey; and Dr. Paris Pişmiş, the first female astronomer of Turkey.

Contemporary alumni include Prof. Feryal Özel (Class of 1992), the first Turkish scientist to be accepted into the NASA Hubble program; Dr. Ahmed Akgiray (Class of 2001), the youngest Turk to work at NASA; Prof. Dr. Aslı Tolun (Class of 1967), the only Turkish female scientist elected to the EMBO; and Fatma Torun Reid (Class of 1958), psychologist and founder of AŞAM, Turkey's first psychological counseling institute. The school is affiliated with various business leaders both domestically and internationally.Serpil Timuray (Class of 1985) was listed by Fortune Magazine as No. 23 on the World's Most Powerful Women list in 2016, and also appeared in Newsweek on its list of World's Most Influential Women in 2013. Magdalena Yeşil, a significant figure in Silicon Valley, entrepreneur, author, and venture capitalist, best known as the first investor and founding board member of Salesforce, and Dr. Canan Özsoy, longtime CEO of General Electric Turkey, are both UAA alumni.

Many artists and journalists are among the alumni, including Tülay German (Class of 1956), folk and jazz vocalist, awarded the Grand Prix du Disque by the Académie Charles Cros in 1981; Gülbün Mesara (Class of 1958), illumination (tezhip) artist and educator, recognized as one of Turkey's "Living Human Treasures" and recipient of the 2022 Turkish Presidential Culture and Arts Grand Award; and Leyla Umar (Class of 1948), award-winning journalist and columnist, considered one of the pioneers of Turkish journalism.

=== Academia, Science & Medicine ===
- Ahmed Akgiray (Class of 2001) – RF/microwave engineer; worked on sub-millimeter instrumentation at the NASA Jet Propulsion Laboratory; later faculty in electrical engineering at Özyeğin University.
- Karabekir Akkoyunlu (Class of 2001) – Political scientist specializing in comparative politics and authoritarian regimes; faculty member at SOAS University of London.
- Gülşat Aygen (Class of 1977) – Distinguished Teaching Professor of Linguistics at Northern Illinois University; specializes in syntax, morphology, and Turkish linguistics.
- Ayşe Durakbaşa (Class of 1979) – Sociologist and historian of modern Turkey and women's studies; professor at Marmara University.
- Beki Kan (Class of 1969) – Professor of biophysics; head of department at Acıbadem University School of Medicine.
- Gizem Karaali (Class of 1992) – Professor of mathematics at Pomona College; co-founder and editor of the Journal of Humanistic Mathematics; recipient of the 2010 Young Investigator Award from the National Security Agency.
- Türkan Kumbaracı Gardenier (Class of 1958) – Chair of Industrial Engineering at the Middle East Technical University in Ankara; named a Lifetime Achiever by Marquis Who’s Who; recognized in 2000 Outstanding Scholars of the 21st Century and Great Women of the 21st Century.
- Canan Karatay (Class of 1961) – Renowned cardiologist; founding rector of the Faculty of Medicine at Istanbul Bilim University; widely known for public work on nutrition and health.
- Zaruhi Kavaljian (Class of 1898) – Medicine; the first woman doctor of the Ottoman Empire.
- Sabahat Tuluy Kaymakçalan (Class of 1943) – First female cardiologist in Turkey; co-founder of the Turkish Cardiology Society; professor and head of the Cardiology Department at Ankara University; served as personal physician to İsmet İnönü, the second President of Turkey.
- Zeynep İlsen Önsan (Class of 1964) – Emeritus professor of chemical engineering at Boğaziçi University; specialized in heterogeneous catalysis and reaction engineering.
- Sibel Özbudun (Class of 1973) – Anthropologist, translator, and academic at the Hacettepe University Department of Anthropology.
- Paris Pişmiş (Class of 1930) – First female astronomer of Turkey; first Turkish woman to earn a PhD in science from Istanbul University; researcher at Harvard, Princeton, and NASA.
- Semra Somersan (Class of 1963) – Sociologist and anthropologist; professor at Istanbul Bilgi University Department of Sociology; noted for work on urban issues and human rights.
- Azade Seyhan – Academic and author; Professor of German and Comparative Literature at Bryn Mawr College.
- Ayshe Talay-Ongan (Class of 1965) – Developmental psychologist; professor at Macquarie University, Australia.
- Meliha Terzioğlu (Class of 1934) – Renowned biochemist and academic; founder of the Department of Physiology at the Cerrahpaşa Faculty of Medicine; recognized among The Leading Women of the 20th Century by the Cambridge Biographical Centre (1989); honorary member of the Turkish Academy of Sciences (1995).
- Fatma Torun Reid (Class of 1958) – Psychologist; founder of AŞAM, Turkey's first psychological consultancy center.
- Sevim Tekeli (Class of 1950) – Renowned historian of science; professor emerita at Ankara University; specialized in Ottoman and Islamic scientific history.
- Feryal Özel (Class of 1992) – World-renowned astrophysicist; fellow at the Harvard-Radcliffe Institute; recipient of the 2013 Maria Goeppert Mayer Award from the American Physical Society; former chair of NASA’s Astrophysics Advisory Committee.

=== Politics, diplomacy and social work ===
- Fatma Serpil Alpman, diplomat and ambassador
- Sevda Bakman, professor at Boğaziçi University; co-founder of the Mother Child Education Foundation (AÇEV).
- Melek Sina Baydur, diplomat and ambassador
- Zehra Zeynep Dereli, politician and entrepreneur; founding member of DEVA Party; founder of TINK Schools.
- İdil Eser, human rights advocate; director of Amnesty International Turkey.
- Sabiha Gökçen, aviator; first female combat pilot; adopted daughter of Mustafa Kemal Atatürk
- İştar Gözaydın, academic and human rights activist; co-founder of Açık Radyo and the Helsinki Citizens' Assembly
- Göksel Kalaycıoğlu, politician
- Birgen Keleş, politician
- Melek El Nimer, social entrepreneur and social worker; founder of the Social Support Society and Unite Lebanon Youth Project
- Ayşen Özyeğin, philanthropist and social worker; co-founder and president of AÇEV.
- Ayşe Sezgin, diplomat and ambassador
- Nur Serter, academic and politician
- Binnaz Toprak, CHP Member of Parliament; political scientist and professor at Boğaziçi University

=== Arts, Literature & Media ===
- Uğur Akdora (Class of 1969) – Musician and vocalist best known for “Hayırdır İnşallah (Neler Oluyor Hayatta)” in the 1970s.
- Benli Belkıs (Class of 1935) – Actress, model, and socialite; prominent figure in Turkish cinema and society life.
- Bahar Erkal Bahar (Class of 1998) – Actress; co-founder of Craft Tiyatro.
- İpek Çalışlar (Class of 1965) – Journalist at Cumhuriyet and author; known for her biographies of Halide Edib Adıvar and “Latife Hanım”.
- Nilgün Cerrahoğlu (Class of 1970) – Journalist and longtime columnist for Cumhuriyet.
- Selma Emiroğlu (Class of 1946) – First female cartoonist of Turkey, best known for work in Akbaba magazine.
- Gülsün Erbil (born 1948) – Painter and visual artist; considered one of the pioneering figures of contemporary Turkish abstract art; founding member and president of the Istanbul Museum of Modern Art Association (İstanbul Modern Sanat Müzesi Derneği).
- Canan Ergüder (Class of 1994) – Actress with notable roles in Turkish television and cinema.
- Mahinur Ergun (Class of 1974) – Screenwriter and film director; directed the influential TV series Şaşıfelek Çıkmazı and Asmalı Konak; recipient of Kültür Bakanlığı Başarı Ödülü (1994).
- Kerem Esemen (Class of 2002) – Musician, composer, and conductor; founder and artistic director of the İstanbul Film Music Orchestra (İFMO).
- Can Evrenol (Class of 2000) – Film director; known internationally for horror films including the feature Baskın.
- Tülay German (Toulaï in France) (Class of 1956) – Renowned musician; folk and jazz vocalist; awarded the Grand Prix du Disque (Académie Charles Cros, 1981).
- Ece Hakim (Class of 2017) – Actress known for roles in TV series Yağmur Zamanı (2004), Gece Gündüz, Umutsuz Ev Kadınları and Eşkıya Dünyaya Hükümdar Olmaz.
- Metin Hara (Class of 2000) – Writer and alternative therapist; author of Invasion of Love.
- Emre Karacaoğlu (Class of 2001) – Music and literature writer for Yüxexes and Bantmagazine.
- Pelin Ekinci Kaya (Class of 1993) – Prominent film and television producer; known for her work with Beşiktaş Kültür Merkezi and Netflix.
- Çiçek Kahraman (Class of 1995) – Award-winning film editor; recipient of Altın Koza for Best Film Editing (twice) for the feature films Ara and Ses.
- Hikmet Körmükçü (Class of 1970) – Award-winning screen and theatre actress; recipient of Afife Tiyatro Ödülleri three times.
- Gülbün Mesara (Class of 1958) – Illumination (tezhip) artist and educator; directed the Süheyl Ünver Nakışhanesi at Istanbul University–Cerrahpaşa; recognized as one of Turkey's “Living Human Treasures”; recipient of the 2022 Türkiye Cumhurbaşkanlığı Kültür ve Sanat Büyük Ödülü.
- Füsun Onur (Class of 1957) – Renowned sculptor and visual artist; recognized for installations and conceptual art; received the 2004 Uluslararası Eleştirmenler Derneği Onur Sanatçısı Ödülü.
- Zeynep Arabacıoğlu Özbilen (Class of 1983) – Jazz and world-music singer; best known as a vocalist for Ayhan Sicimoğlu and Latin All Stars.
- Semra Özdamar (Class of 1974) – Award-winning actress; Altın Portakal for Kara Çarşaflı Gelin (1977).
- Deniz Özerman (Class of 1988) – Actress known for comedy and theatre; best known as part of BKM Oyuncuları and Bir Demet Tiyatro in the 1990s.
- Leyla Sayar (Class of 1958) – Actress; prominent figure of Turkish cinema's classical era.
- Seçkin Selvi (Class of 1957) – Award-winning translator, theatre critic, writer, and stage and costume designer; columnist for Günaydın and Sabah newspapers; recipient of multiple honors, including the Translators’ Association Honor Award.
- Ayşe Sezerman (Class of 1982) – Renowned soprano; academic at the Istanbul University State Conservatory; recipient of the Ferhan Onat Honor Award presented by the Semiha Berksoy Opera Foundation.
- M. Ferhan Şensoy (Class of 2007) – Actress and writer; known for her performances in Çalıkuşu (2013), Fi (2017), and Hot Skull (2022), and as a writer for Hot Skull.
- Derya Şensoy (Class of 2008) – Actress; known for Doksanlar (2013) and Dünya Hali (2018).
- Sevil Üstekin (Class of 1961) – Award-winning screen and stage actress; recipient of two Avni Dilligil Awards; known for Bizimkiler.
- Nazlı Tolga (Class of 1997) – Award-winning journalist and TV anchor with Fox TV Turkey.
- Çiğdem Tunç (Class of 1978) – Actress, ballerina, and TV host.
- Leyla Umar (Class of 1948) – Award-winning journalist and columnist; considered one of the pioneers of Turkish journalism.
- Ayşegül Yüksel (Class of 1959) – Award-winning theatre scholar, critic, and author; head of the Department of English Language and Literature at the Ankara University Faculty of Languages, History and Geography;

=== Business, Entrepreneurship & Technology ===
- Didem Ün Ateş (Class of 1992) – Senior business leader and technology executive; founder and CEO of LotusAI.
- Sedef Ayhan (Class of 1996) – Managing Director, Maersk Eastern Mediterranean.
- Hakan Baş (Class of 2001) – Entrepreneur; co-founder of Lidyana and Peak Games.
- Bahar Birinci (Class of 1973) – CEO, Emirates Turkey (1993–2013).
- Sibel Demir (Class of 1995) – CEO, Kotex Turkey; listed in Capital/Ekonomist “50 Powerful Women CEOs” (No:46).
- Yıldız Günay (Class of 1985) – CEO and board member; general manager for Turkish Education Foundation (TEV) (2012–2021).
- Zeynep Keskin (Class of 1984) – Vice President at Oracle; former CEO of SAP Turkey.
- Melike Koçoğlu (Class of 1997) – CEO, Alarko Holding; previously GM for Tamek and Eczacıbaşı Profesyonel.
- Viki Motro (Class of 1982) – General Manager, Henkel Beauty Care Professional; previously GM for Eczacıbaşı Schwarzkopf.
- Canan Özsoy (Class of 1980) – CEO, General Electric Turkey (2012–2022); featured in Fortune Turkey “Most Powerful Women.”
- İnci Pirinççioğlu (Class of 1941) – Pioneer as Turkey's first professional tourist guide.
- Serra Sabancı (Class of 1993) – Businesswoman, 3rd generation of the Sabancı family; board member at Sabancı Holding; trustee at Sabancı University and Sabancı Foundation.
- Lale Saral Develioğlu (Class of 1986) – Senior executive in Ülker and Turkcell; board director for Turkcell, Isuzu, Anadolu Efes, and Nobel İlaç.
- Kağan Sümer (Class of 2005) – Entrepreneur; co-founder of Gorillas, Berlin-based delivery startup.
- Aylin Uçkunkaya Suntay (Class of 1992) – Finance executive; CEO of Gazprombank.
- Serpil Timuray (Class of 1987) – CEO of Vodafone Turkey; named among Fortune magazine's “Most Powerful Women in the World.”
- Berna Ülman (Class of 1983) – Board member; Senior Vice President for Visa Europe & Turkey; featured in Fortune Turkey “Most Powerful Women.”
- Magdalena Yeşil (Class of 1976) – Silicon Valley entrepreneur; investor and board member of Salesforce.

=== Notable faculty ===
- Ahmet Hamdi Tanpınar – Renowned novelist, poet, and essayist; taught literature at UAA.
- Layika Karabey – Educator; long-serving faculty member.
- Mebrure Gönenç – Educator; one of the first female MPs of the Republic of Turkey.

=== Historic Figures from American College for Girls’ Üsküdar era ===
- Halide Edip Adıvar – Novelist, nationalist, and political leader; prominent during the Turkish War of Independence.
- Gülistan İsmet – Turkish writer; leading female figure of the Second Constitutional Era.
- Safiye Ali – First female physician of the Republic of Turkey.
- Mihri Pektaş – One of the first female members of the Turkish Parliament (1935).

== In popular culture ==
In 2013, Turkish musician Can Bonomo filmed the music video for his song Şaşkın on the Üsküdar American Academy campus.

The feature film Sesinde Aşk Var (2019) was shot primarily on the UAA campus, with its grounds and buildings serving as central filming locations.

== See also ==
- Koç School
- Robert College
- Boğaziçi University
- American Collegiate Institute
- Talas American College
- Turkey–United States relations
- Education in the Ottoman Empire
- List of missionary schools in Turkey
