= Kalaycıoğlu =

Kalaycıoğlu is a Turkish surname which means the child of a tinman. One of the earliest records of the surname was found in Kayseri, Turkey, in the 1660s. Notable people with the surname include:

- Ersin Kalaycıoğlu, Turkish academic
- Göksel Kalaycıoğlu (born 1936), Turkish politician
- Zafer Kalaycıoğlu (born 1965), Turkish basketball coach
