= Canan Karatay =

Turkish medical doctor

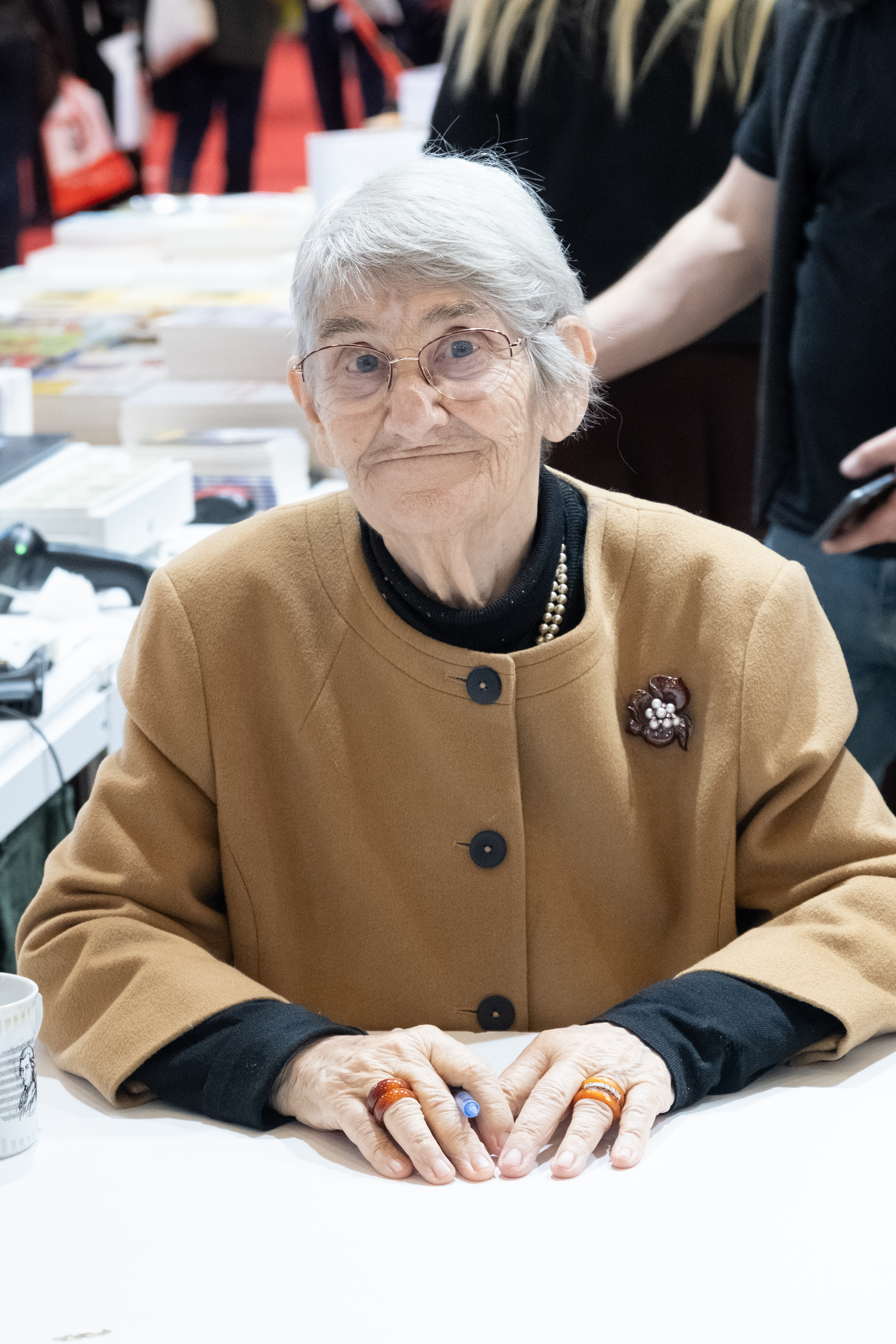
- Karatay at the Istanbul Book Fair in 2025
- Born: Mutia Canan Erdem; 2 March 1943 (age 83); Elazığ, Turkey
- Other names: Mutia Canan Karatay, Canan Efendigil Karatay
- Citizenship: Turkey
- Education: Istanbul University
- Occupation: Medical doctor
- Spouse: Ali Başak Karatay (m. 1979; died 2025)
- Children: 1

Mutia Canan Karatay (born 2 March 1943) is a Turkish medical doctor, heart and internal medicine professor, former rector of Istanbul Bilim University and internal medicine and cardiology sciences Main Branch teacher, and heart and internal medicine specialist.

== Life ==
Canan Karatay was born on 2 March 1943 in Elazığ as the daughter of Vasfiye and Ömer Naimi Erdem. Their surname, which was Erdem, was changed to Efendigil by her father in the 1950s. She graduated high-school from Üsküdar Amerikan Academy in 1961, and in 1967 graduated from Istanbul Üniversitesi Medical Faculty. In 1972 she completed her Internal medicine residency training at the Treatment Clinic of Istanbul University. With the scholarship she earned from the English Government she studied at Liverpool Regional Cardiac Center in cardiology specialist education between the years 1972–1974. Between the years 1974-1976 she worked as a chief assistant at Istanbul University Treatment Clinic. Karatay continues her duty at Florence Nightingale Group Hospital. She is married to Ali Karatay, who is one of the founders of Boğaziçi University's Department of Philosophy and is still teaching as an Honorary Faculty Member. She has a son named Mehmet Rahmi Karatay.

Karatay belongs to the Islamic faith and is Sunni. She comes from a religious family and her grandfathers were muftis.

== Books ==
- Karatay Diyeti Bilimsel Gerçeklerle Kilo Vermenin ABC'si, HAYY KİTAP, 2011 ISBN 978-605-4325-48-1
- Karatay Diyeti'yle Yaşam Boyu Sağlık, HAYY KİTAP, 2012 ISBN 978-605-4325-72-6
- Karatay Mutfağı Kalıcı Kilo Verdiren Yemek Tarifler, HAYY KİTAP, 2012 ISBN 978-605-4325-84-9
- Karatay Diyeti'yle Beslenme Tuzaklarından Kurtuluş Rehberi, HAYY KİTAP, 2013 ISBN 978-605-5181-38-3
- Anne Adayları ve Hamileler İçin Karatay Diyeti, HAYY KİTAP, 2015 ISBN 978-605-9841-06-1
- Gerçek Tıbbın 10 Şifresi, HAYY KİTAP, 2018 ISBN 978-975-2477-75-9
- Karatay Diyeti'yle Obezite ve Diyabete Çözüm Var! HAYY KİTAP, 2018 ISBN 978-605-5181-15-4

Her first book was published in April 2011 with the name "Karatay Diet". Later, November 2011 "Lifelong Health with Karatay Diet", May 2012 "Karatay Cuisine", February 2013 "There is a Solution to Obesity and Diabetes with Karatay Diet!" In October 2013, her book titled "The Karatay Diet Guide to Freedom from Nutritional Traps" was published.

== Criticisms ==
Karatays recommendations such as: diabetes test being harmful during pregnancy, that Vitamin D protects against diabetes, that drinking Turkish coffee is beneficial for children have been debated in the media, Turkish Society of Endocrinology and Metabolism filed a criminal complaint against Karatay to the Office of the Chief Public Prosecutor due to her statements about sugar loading. It was filed by the Central Council of the Turkish Medical Association and the Istanbul Chamber of Physicians on the grounds that she violated medical ethics and medical professional ethics. The Scientific Committee of the Ministry of Health made a statement on these issues and defended the opposite of Karatay's statements. A decision of non-prosecution was given by the Office of the Chief Public Prosecutor about the accusations. Karatay was suspended from the profession for 15 days by the Istanbul Medical Chamber and the Constitutional Court ruled that Karatay's freedom of expression was violated by this sentence.
