= Alpman =

Alpman is a Turkish surname. It may refer to:

- Ayten Alpman (1929–2012), Turkish female jazz and pop singer
- Fatma Serpil Alpman (born 1950), Turkish female diplomat and former ambassador
