= Ersin Kalaycıoğlu =

Turkish political scientist

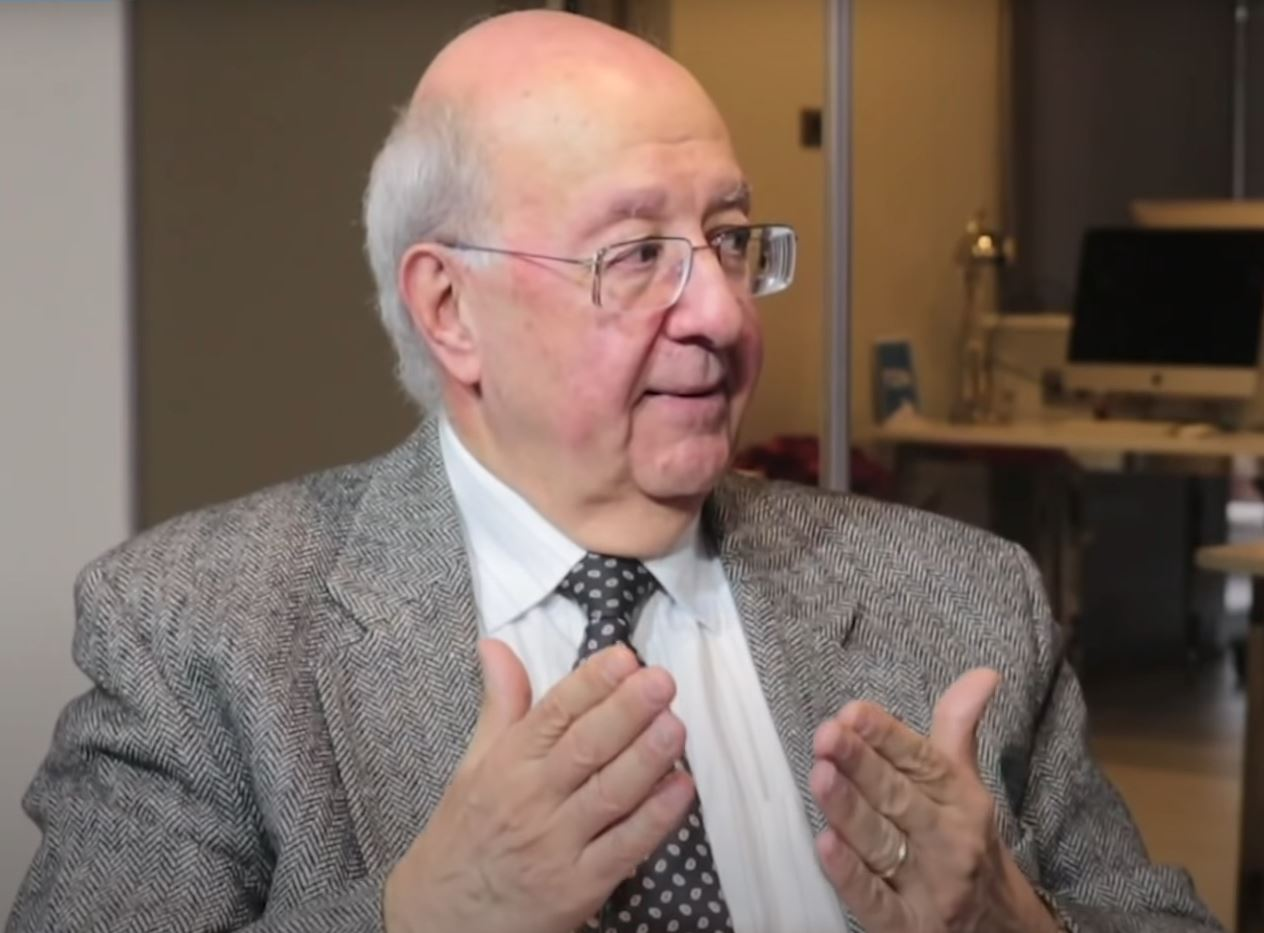
Portrait of Ersin Kalaycıoğlu

Mahmut Ersin Kalaycıoğlu is a Turkish political scientist, professor of political sciences at Sabancı University and former president of Işık University, Istanbul (2004–2007). He is also a nephew of the well-known Turkish constitution professor, Tarık Zafer Tunaya.

Kalaycıoğlu received his undergraduate degree from Istanbul University, Faculty of Economics in 1973 (major Economics, minors Political Science and Statistics). He continued his education at the University of Iowa, Department of Political Science, and received his M.A. in 1975, and his Ph.D. in 1977. Kalaycıoğlu started his academic career at Istanbul University, Faculty of Economics from fall 1977 through spring 1982, and at the Faculty of Political Science of the same university between fall 1982 and spring 1984. Kalaycıoğlu was employed as a full-time faculty member at Boğaziçi University from fall 1984 to spring 2002.

As an academic, Kalaycıoğlu specializes in the study of political representation and participation. Kalaycıoğlu has contributed a chapter on Turkey in Mark Kasselman, Joel Krieger and William A. Joseph (eds.) Introduction to Comparative Politics, 3rd ed., (Boston, Houghton-Mifflin: 2005).

Kalaycıoğlu is currently a full-time professor of political science at Sabancı University. Present courses offered by him include: Introduction to Turkish Politics and Comparative Party Systems and Interest Groups.

Kalaycıoğlu is a board member of the Turkish Economic and Social Studies Foundation, and also a member of Turkish Political Science Association, Turkish Social Science Association, International Studies Association, International Political Science Association, and Middle Eastern Studies Association of North America (MESA).
