= Ayşe Sezgin =

Turkish diplomat (born 1958)

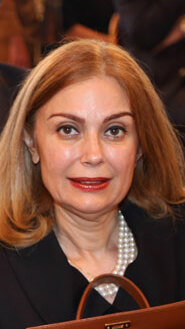
- Sezgin in 2013

Turkey Ambassador to Malta
- In office 30 November 2013 – 1 July 2015
- President: Abdullah Gül; Recep Tayyip Erdoğan
- Succeeded by: Reha Keskintepe

Turkey Ambassador to Austria
- In office 25 October 2011 – 18 November 2013
- President: Abdullah Gül
- Preceded by: Kadri Ecvet Tezcan
- Succeeded by: Hasan Göğüş

Turkey Ambassador to Slovenia
- In office 15 March 2008 – 9 October 2009
- President: Abdullah Gül
- Preceded by: Melek Sina Baydur
- Succeeded by: Derya Kanbay

Personal details
- Born: 23 January 1958 (age 68) Ankara, Turkey
- Spouse: Aydın Adnan Sezgin
- Children: 1
- Education: Administrative and Social Science
- Alma mater: Hacettepe University
- Profession: Diplomat

Ayşe Sezgin (born 23 January 1958) is a Turkish diplomat and former Ambassador of Turkey.

== Private life ==
Ayşe Sezgin was born in Ankara, Turkey in 1958. She completed her high school education at Üsküdar American Academy in Istanbul, and was then educated at the Faculty of Administrative and Social Science in Hacettepe University, Ankara.

She is married to diplomat and ambassador Aydın Adnan Sezgin. They have one child.

== Career ==
Ayşe Sezgin entered in the service of Ministry of Foreign Affairs in 1983. She worked in many diplomatic missions of Turkey, including Antwerp, Belgium, Mosul, Iraq, Lyon, France, Geneva, Switzerland (United Nations), Paris, France and London, United Kingdom. From 2006 to 2008, Sezgin was the Deputy General Manager of the European Union Affairs Department in the Ministry.

She was appointed Ambassador of Turkey to Slovenia succeeding Melek Sina Baydur and serving in Ljubljana between 15 March 2008 and 9 October 2009. Returned home, she became in 2010 Deputy Undersecretary responsible for European Union Affairs in the Ministry, the highest-ranked position held for the first time ever by a female civil servant in Turkey. In 2011, Sezgin was appointed ambassador to Austria succeeding Kadri Ecvet Tezcan. Her next appointment was to Valletta as Ambassador to Malta, where she served until 1 July 2015. On 14 June 2017, she became advisor at the Ministry.
