= Aydın Adnan Sezgin =

Turkish diplomat and politician (born 1956)

Personal details
- Born: 13 July 1956 (age 70) Aydın, Turkey
- Party: Justice Party; Good Party
- Spouse: Ayşe Sezgin
- Children: 1
- Education: Hacettepe University; Paris-Panthéon-Assas University

Aydın Adnan Sezgin (born 13 July 1956) is a Turkish diplomat and a politician. He is one of the founders of the Good Party which was established in 2017. He is a member of the Turkish Parliament.

== Biography ==
Sezgin was born in Aydın on 13 July 1956. He is a graduate of Tevfik Fikret High School. He received a degree in economy from Hacettepe University. During his studies at Hacettepe he was a member of the Justice Party and served in its youth branch in Ankara. He obtained his Ph.D. in economy and anthropology from Paris-Panthéon-Assas University. His thesis was about economy and civilization.

In 1982 Sezgin joined the Ministry of Foreign Affairs and served in different diplomatic posts until 2010 when he was named as the ambassador of Turkey to Russia. In 2014 he was appointed ambassador of Turkey to Italy. He retired from diplomatic post in late 2016. He involved in the establishment of the Good Party in 2017. In the 2018 elections Sezgin was elected from Aydın and was a member of the 27th term of the Parliament. Sezgin was not included in the deputy list of the Good Party for the general election held on 14 May 2023.

Sezgin's wife is Ayşe Sezgin who is also a diplomat. They have a daughter.
