= Serpil Timuray =

Turkish businesswoman

- Education: Üsküdar American Academy; Asheville High School
- Alma mater: Boğaziçi University (BS)
- Known for: CEO, Vodafone Turkey; CEO, Vodafone Africa, Middle East and Asia-Pacific (AMAP)
- Children: 1

Serpil Timuray is a Turkish businesswoman, the current Chief Executive of Vodafone Africa, Middle East and Asia-Pacific (AMAP) region.

== Early years ==
She was educated in the Üsküdar American Academy in Istanbul, and graduated from the Asheville High School in North Carolina, USA. Returning to Turkey, she studied Business Administration at Boğaziçi University and earned a B.S. degree.

== Career ==
She started her business life in the marketing department of Procter & Gamble Turkey in 1991. She joined DanoneSA Tikveşli company of DanoneSA, a Turkish joint venture company of Groupe Danone with Sabancı Holding, and became marketing director and member of the executive committee in 1999. She was appointed general manager and chairperson of the executive committee at DanoneSA Dairy Products in June 2002.

In following years, Serpil Timuray was engaged in the takeover of DanoneSA companies and Nestlé Turkey Dairy Products by the Danone Group with their subsequent consolidation and integration. She was jointly responsible for Danone Group's one of the most comprehensive industrial investment programs worldwide. She administered so a 100%-domestic production realized in Turkey.

On November 11, 2008 she transferred to Vodafone Turkey. Timuray became its chief operating officer on January 1, 2009. She helped the company grow more than 30%.

After the subordination of Turkey Vodafone to Africa, Middle East and Asia-Pacific Operations (AMAP), she was appointed director of AMAP, Vodafone's one of the two operational regions, with effect of October 1, 2013 in addition to her existing post. In this capacity, she reports to the CEO of the AMAP Region Nick Read. Vodafone CEO Vittorio Colao announced that she is appointed CEO of the AMAP replacing Nick Read as of January 1, 2014.

On October 1, 2018, Serpil Timuray, Member of the Vodafone Group World Executive Board, was appointed as the Chief Executive Officer (CEO) of Vodafone Group Europe.

== Personal life ==
She is married and has one child.
