= Günaydın =

Günaydın is a Turkish surname, literally “good morning”. Notable people with the surname include:

- Dilara Buse Günaydın (born 1989), Turkish female swimmer
- Engin Günaydın (born 1972), Turkish actor and comedian
- Erol Günaydın (1933–2012), Turkish actor

It is also a Turkish newspaper,

- Günaydın
