= Ayshe Talay-Ongan =

Turkish writer

Ayshe Talay-Ongan (born 23 September 1947) is a Turkish-born author and a retired academic from Macquarie University, Sydney (1989–2007), from where she received the Outstanding Teacher Award in 2003. She is a psychologist and specialises in early development and intervention, and is an alumnus of American Academy for Girls (Istanbul, 1965), Middle East Technical University (Ankara, 1969) and Columbia University (New York City, 1975). She is married and has two daughters.

== Publications ==
Her textbooks are Typical and Atypical Development in Early Childhood (Memo Press, 1999), Early Development, Risk and Disability: Relational Contexts (Pearson, 2004) and with Emily Ap, Child Development and Teaching Young Children (Thomson, 2006). She is also the author of Turquoise: A Love Story (Sid Harta Publishers, 2012). "Emerald: Scenes from a Marriage (2015) is her second novel.
