= Introduction to Comparative Politics =

2018 political science-based book

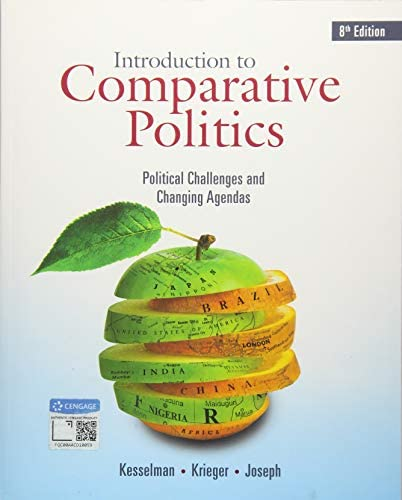
- 8th edition (2018)
- Author: Mark Kesselman, Joel Krieger; William A. Joseph
- Language: English
- Genre: Political science
- Published: 2018
- Publisher: Cengage
- Publication place: United States
- ISBN: 9781337560443

Introduction to Comparative Politics: Political Challenges and Changing Agendas is a political science-based book co-written by Mark Kesselman, Joel Krieger, William A. Joseph, published by Cengage. It discusses comparative politics. The book consists of 754 pages, which make up 15 chapters. The book was originally published on September 7, 1999, and has 9 editions as of 2025.

== Contents ==
The text serves as an introductory level book to comparative politics. The book consists of four parts: Introduction, Consolidated Democracies, Mixed Systems, and Authoritarian Regimes. Each part of the book consists of chapters that go into detail to explain the vast amount of topics that make up comparative politics. The book reflects on numerous nations across the globe, ranging from Britain, France, Germany, and The United States, to Brazil, Mexico, South Africa, Nigeria, and Russia.

=== Part I: Introduction ===
The first part consists of a singular chapter, which introduces readers to comparative politics around the globe. This part discusses many topics, such as the state of comparative politics in a volatile world, what and how comparative politics compares, themes for comparative analysis, classifying political systems, and organization of the text.

=== Part II: Consolidated Democracies ===
The second part consists of 7 chapters, which focus on consolidated democracies around the globe. Nations that are discussed are: Britain, France, Germany, European Union, Japan, India, and the United States. This part discusses many topics, such as the making of these modern states, political and economic development, governance and policy-making, representation and participation, and politics in transition, in reference to Britain, France, Germany, European Union, Japan, India, and the United States.

=== Part III: Mixed Systems ===
The third part consists of 5 chapters, which focus on mixed systems around the globe. Nations that are discussed are: Brazil, Mexico, South Africa, Nigeria, and the Russian Federation. This part discusses many topics, such as the making of these modern states, political and economic development, governance and policy-making, representation and participation, and politics in transition, in reference to Brazil, Mexico, South Africa, Nigeria, and the Russian Federation.

=== Part IV: Authoritarian Regimes ===
The fourth part consists of 2 chapters, which focus on authoritarian regimes around the globe. Nations that are discussed are: Iran and China. This part discusses many topics, such as the making of these modern states, political and economic development, governance and policy-making, representation and participation, and politics in transition, in reference to Iran and China.

== Background ==
Each author of the book is in the political science profession, and all have developed several academic papers that discussed the main findings of the book, especially in the years prior to its publication. Mark Kesselman is a political scientist at Columbia University, with an interest in research. He is a Professor Emeritus of Government at the university. Joel Krieger is a political scientist at Wellesley College, and is a scholar of comparative and international politics. He is a Professor Emeritus of Political Science at the university. William A. Joseph is a political scientist at Wellesley College. He is a professor of Political Science at the university.

== Publication history ==
- Krieger, Joel; Kesselman, Mark; Joseph, William A., eds. (2000). Introduction to comparative politics: political challenges and changing agendas (2nd ed.). Boston, Mass.: Houghton Mifflin. ISBN 978-0-395-93704-4.
- Kesselman, Mark; Krieger, Joel; Joseph, William A., eds. (2004). Introduction to comparative politics (3rd ed.). Boston: Houghton Mifflin. ISBN 978-0-618-21446-4.
- Kesselman, Mark; Abrahamian, Ervand, eds. (2007). Introduction to comparative politics: political challenges and changing agendas (4th ed.). Boston, Mass.: Houghton Mifflin. ISBN 978-0-618-60447-0.
- Krieger, Joel; Kesselman, Mark; Joseph, William A., eds. (2009). Introduction to Comparative Politics (5th ed.). Cengage Learning. ISBN 978-0-547-21629-4.
- Kesselman, Mark; Krieger, Joel; Joseph, William A., eds. (2013). Introduction to comparative politics: political challenges and changing agendas (6th ed.). Boston, MA: Wadsworth. ISBN 978-1-111-83498-2. OCLC 863645372.
- Kesselman, Mark; Krieger, Joel; Joseph, William A., eds. (2016). Introduction to comparative politics: political challenges and changing agendas (7th ed.). Boston, MA: Cengage Learning. ISBN 978-1-285-86533-1.
- Kesselman, Mark; Krieger, Joel; Joseph, William A., eds. (2019). Introduction to comparative politics: political challenges and changing agendas (8th ed.). Boston, MA: Cengage. ISBN 978-1-337-56044-3.
- Kesselman, Mark; Krieger, Joel; Joseph, William A.; Brown, Colin; Bauer, Kelly (2025). Introduction to Comparative Politics: Political Challenges and Changing Agendas. Mason: Cengage. ISBN 978-0-357-79616-0.
