= Fatma Serpil Alpman =

Turkish diplomat

Turkey Ambassador to Kyrgyzstan
- In office October 2004 – September 2009
- President: Ahmet Necdet Sezer; Abdullah Gül
- Preceded by: Muzaffer Eröktem

Personal details
- Born: Fatma Serpil Uludoğan; 30 June 1950 (age 75) Erzurum, Turkey
- Spouse: Önder Alpman
- Children: 2
- Profession: Diplomat

Fatma Serpil Alpman (born Uludoğan on 30 June 1950) is a Turkish retired diplomat and former Ambassador of Turkey.

== Personal life ==
Fatma Serpil Uludoğan was born in Erzurum, Turkey on June 30, 1950. After completing her high school education at Üsküdar American Academy in Istanbul, she studied at Faculty of Political Science, Ankara University graduating in 1972.

She was married to Turkish diplomat Öncer Alpman (1947-2002), who died end May 2002 at the age of 55 in brussels, Belgium, where he was the general consul. She has two children from this marriage.

== Career ==
After serving in various positions in the Ministry of Foreign Affairs, she became general consul in 1999 in Rotterdam, Netherlands, where she was until 2001. In October 2004, she was appointed Ambassador of Turkey to Kyrgyzstan succeeding Muzaffer Eröktem. She became so the first ever female ambassador of Turkey to a country in Central Asia. She served in Bishkek until September 2009. After returning home, she served as the Undersecretary of the Ministry and Chief Advisor for Foreign Policy of the Turkish Grand National Assembly. In 2012, she was appointed Representative of the Ministry in İzmir serving until 2014.

Currently, she is retired.
