= Gulsat Aygen =

Turkish linguist

Academic work
- Discipline: Linguistics

Gülşat Aygen is a Turkish linguist, educator, author, editor, and translator. Aygen's research agenda includes both theoretical and applied linguistics, encompassing morphosyntax, language education, and many Turkic languages, particularly Turkish, her native language. She is currently a distinguished teaching professor of linguistics at Northern Illinois University.

Aygen's wider intellectual interests have led her to translate dozens of articles, a book, and edit many translated books from English to Turkish, transcribe and edit old Ottoman manuscripts. The 8th edition of her translation of Elias Canetti’s Crowds and Power was published in 1998.

== Education ==
Aygen received her BA in 1996 and her MA in 1998 from Boğaziçi University, Istanbul, Turkey. She received her Ph.D. in linguistics from Harvard University, after completing her graduate studies at Harvard and MIT (1998–2002). Her formal advisors were primarily Jim C-T Huang of Harvard and Shigeru Miyagawa of MIT. Noam Chomsky was her informal advisor.

== Research agenda ==
In theoretical linguistics, Aygen has worked extensively on the nature of finiteness, case, and agreement regarding clausal architecture in the world's languages, as well as the structure of reduced relative clauses and embedded clauses, specificity, scrambling, the copula.

In applied linguistics and language education, she cultivated a descriptive linguistics approach to English grammar designed to not only assist language learners of all levels to develop and refine their English language use, but also to help those language users understand the deeper structures behind the language without resorting to simple memorization.

In her book English Grammar: a descriptive linguistics approach, she focused on the contradiction between descriptive and prescriptive grammar by developing a new framework with which prescriptive grammar can be re-analyzed using the linguistic tools of descriptive linguistics. This approach has been adopted to teach English grammar to native speakers or non-native speakers of English. The same approach has been adopted to teaching different aspects of English, such as writing. In Word Choice Errors: A descriptive linguistics approach, this descriptive linguistics approach is applied by enabling language learners to understand their choice of words at a true descriptive linguistics level.

In languages other than English, Aygen also worked and published on teaching Turkish as a second language, English as a second language, and gave talks on teaching Kurdish as a second language. She has also authored reference grammars of Kurmanji Kurdish and Kirmancki/Zazaki Kurdish.

In sociolinguistics, she has worked on the languages of the Grand Bazaar and in media studies on syntax of the TV series Frasier.

She has also co-authored work on morphosyntax of agrammatic aphasia, neurology, and history of neuroscience.

Podcast Talks

- Part 1 (Northern Public Radio)
- Part 2 (Northern Public Radio)
- Part 1 (Spotify)
- Part 2 (Spotify)
