= Melek Sina Baydur =

Turkish diplomat

Turkey Ambassador to Bosnia and Herzegovina
- In office 3 January 2003 – 16 December 2005
- President: Ahmet Necdet Sezer
- Preceded by: Ahmet Kamil Erozan
- Succeeded by: Bülent Tulun

Turkey Ambassador to Slovenia
- In office 1 January 2006 – 29 February 2008
- President: Ahmet Necdet Sezer; Abdullah Gül
- Preceded by: Balkan Kızıldeli
- Succeeded by: Ayşe Sezgin

Personal details
- Born: 1948 (age 77–78) Karadeniz Ereğli, Turkey
- Education: Economics
- Alma mater: Istanbul University
- Profession: Diplomat

Melek Sina Baydur (born 1948) is a Turkish retired diplomat and former ambassador of Turkey.

Melek Sina Baydur served as Ambassador of Turkey to Bosnia and Herzegovina in Sarajevo between 3 January 2003 and 16 December 2005. Her next appointment as an ambassador was to Slovenia on 1 January 2006. She served in Ljubljana until 29 February 2008.

Currently, she is retired.
