= Safiye Ali =

First female Turkish physician (1894–1952)

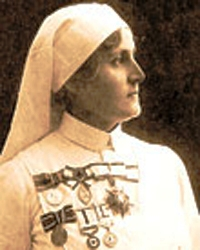
- Born: 2 February 1894; Istanbul, Ottoman Empire
- Died: 5 July 1952 (aged 58); Dortmund, West Germany
- Education: Robert College
- Known for: First female doctor of the Republic of Turkey
- Medical career
- Profession: Physician
- Sub-specialties: Social Medicine
- Research: Pediatrics,Gynecology

Safiye Ali (2 February 1894 – 5 July 1952) or Hatice Safiye Ali was a Turkish physician. She was the first female doctor in the Republic of Turkey. She graduated from the Robert College in Istanbul. She treated soldiers in the Balkan Wars, World War I, and the Turkish War of Independence. She studied medicine in Germany in 1916 and opened her office in Istanbul in 1923.

Safiye researched maternal and infant health. She was also the first woman to teach medicine in Turkey.

== Early life ==
Safiye Ali was born in Istanbul to Emine Hasene Hanım (her mother) and Ali Kırat Pasha (her father). Her father died while she was young, and she was raised in the house of her grandfather, Sheikh Hacı Emin Pasha of Mecca.

== Education ==
In 1916, Safiye graduated from Arnavutköy American College for Girls and was sent to the University of Würzburg (Julius-Maximilians-Universität) at Würzburg. Her education was partly funded by the Ottoman Ministry of Education. During her studies, she took lessons in philosophy and history.

The Bavarian Ministry of Education in Germany did not initially issue the necessary papers for Safiye to take the physical exam (her first medical exam) because she was a graduate of the American College. However, she eventually took the exam in 1918 and graduated in 1921, becoming a physician. After briefly returning to Istanbul, she then returned to Germany once again to specialize in gynecology and pediatrics. During this time, she married her husband, Dr. Ferdinand Krekeler, who later adopted the name of Ferdi Ali.

== Career ==
In June 1923, in Turkey, Safiye obtained her license to practice medicine, becoming the first female doctor in the country. She opened her first practice in Cağaloğlu. Safiye advertised her practice in the newspapers, as other doctors of the time did.

When she began, she had difficulty obtaining patients. Wealthy women did not trust her work as a doctor because she was a woman. Poor women would seek her services, but they did not want to pay the full visit fee for a female physician. There was no support in the medical community, either. In response to those who wished to pay a lower visit fee, she charged the same as her male colleagues. Exceptions were made for patients who were unable to pay, but Safiye Ali fought for "equal pay for equal work".

Safiye Ali was the first female lecturer to teach medicine to girls, giving gynecology and obstetrics lessons at the first girls' medical school established within the American College. She also worked with the Süt Damlası program, a project of the French Red Cross whose goal was to educate mothers about the importance of breastfeeding.

Safiye Ali eventually resigned from Süt Damlası. Her resignation was met with great sorrow by her patients. Women organized protests, first in front of the Hilal-Al-Ahmar society, and then in front of the house of Fuat Bey, who was appointed to replace her. While her critics claimed that she had organized the protests, Ali denied the allegations, claiming that the issue was "created by male doctors who could not tolerate the success of women" and refusing to withdraw her resignation.

After being diagnosed with cancer, she settled in Germany, where she continued to practice medicine until her death at 58 years old in Dortmund, West Germany.

== Research and medical contributions ==
Ali’s research and scientific work were centered on clinical pediatrics, social medicine, and maternal-infant health. Her professional contributions included:

Social Pediatrics and Puericulture: Ali conducted extensive work on the scientific methods of childcare (puericulture). During her leadership at the Süt Damlası (Goutte de Lait), she focused her research on the clinical benefits of breastfeeding and investigated the impact of sterilized milk on reducing infant mortality rates in the post-war period.

Maternal-Infant Health Education: She developed structured training programs for mothers, focusing on infant hygiene and dietetics. She established the "Hilal-i Ahmer Ladies Center Little Children Practice," which served as a clinical research site for monitoring the development of children across different age groups.

Gynecological Advocacy: In her clinical practice and lectures at the medical school for girls within the American College, she emphasized the integration of modern gynecological and obstetrical techniques into the Turkish healthcare system.

Public Health and Social Policy: Her research extended to the socio-economic factors influencing public health. She represented Turkey at international congresses, such as the 1923 Vienna Medical Women’s Congress, where she presented on the status of healthcare and the role of female physicians in social medicine.

== International representation ==
Ali represented the Turkish medical community at several international platforms, including:

The International Medical Women's Congress in Vienna (1923), as the sole delegate from Turkey.

The International Council of Women in London (1924).

The Turkish Women’s Union, where she led the Health Committee and campaigned for the social welfare of vulnerable young women.

== Works on Breastfeeding ==
During her time at Süt Damlası, Safiye Ali emphasized the superiority of breast milk over all other kinds of milk, encouraged women to breastfeed, and led training sessions for malnourished children where she encouraged them to practice healthier diets. She also established the "Hilal-Al-Ahmar Ladies Center Little Children Practice," the first pediatric clinic in Turkey, which resembled Süt Damlası but treated children of different ages.

== Women's People Party and Safiye Ali ==
Safiye was a member of the delegation in the Women's People Party, which promoted the active participation of women in politics and emphasized the needs of children. The Turkish government dismissed the party in 1924, but they continued to organize under the name of the Turkish Women's Union.

She served in the Women's Union as the head of the Health Committee. She also fought to end prostitution, working to establish a girls' dormitory for any girls who were forced into the sex trade.

== Legacy ==
- A family health center in Istanbul is named after her.
- On 2 February 2021, Google celebrated her 127th birthday with a Google Doodle.
- On 30 November 2022, a street in Dortmund was named after her.

== Bibliography ==
- Abadan-Unat, Nermin; Kandiyoti, Deniz; Kıray, Mübeccel Belik (1981), Women in Turkish Society, BRILL, ISBN 90-04-06346-3.
- Arda, Berna (2009), Anatolia; The Cradle of Modern Medicine (PDF), Journal of Ankara University Faculty of Medicine, 62(1)
- Davis, Fanny (1986), The Ottoman Lady: A Social History from 1718 to 1918, Greenwood Publishing Group, ISBN 0-313-24811-7.
