= Zaruhi Kavaljian =

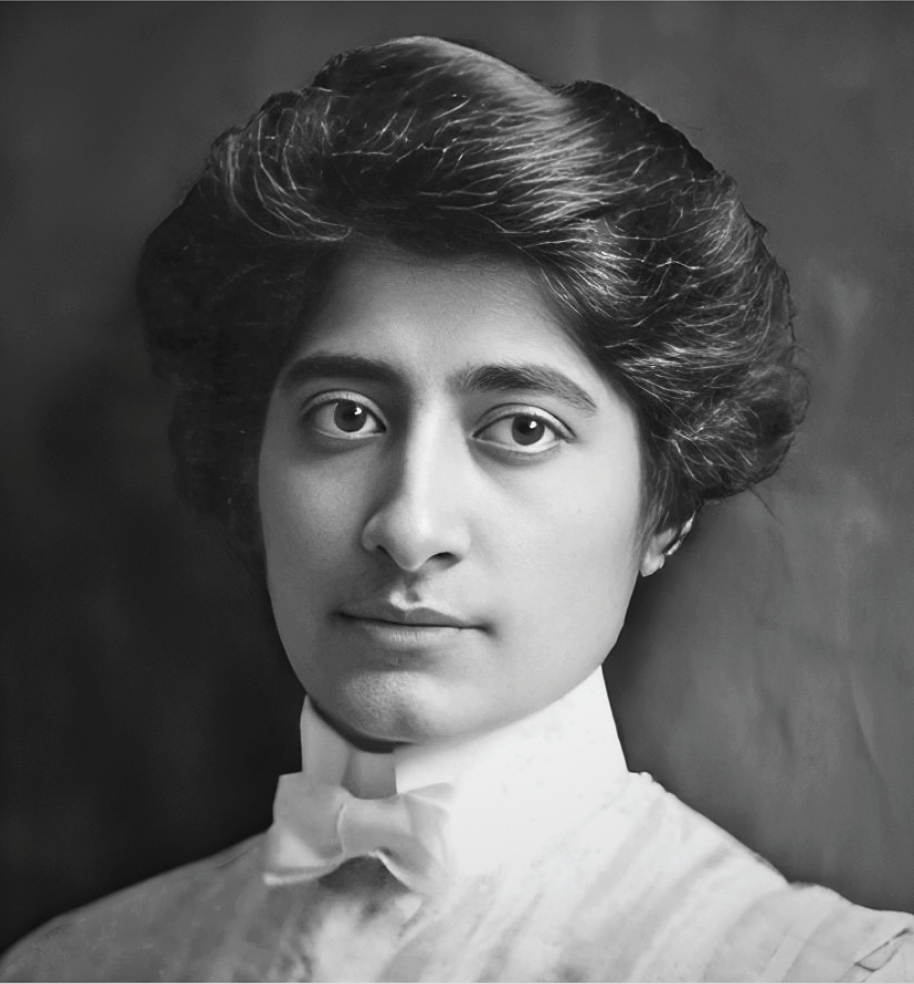
- Born: 1877; Adapazarı
- Died: June 10, 1969 (aged 91–92); Istanbul
- Education: University of Illinois College of Medicine
- Occupations: physician, pedagogue

Zaruhi Kavaljian (Zaruhi Kavalcian, Armenian: Զարուհի Քավալջյան, 1877 – June 10, 1969), first female physician of Armenian descent in Turkey.

== Life and education ==
Zaruhi Kavaljian was born in the city of Adapazar, Turkey, in the family of doctor Serob Kavaljian, who had graduated from the Boston University School of Medicine. He had worked as a doctor in Adapazar and Izmit. After graduating from the American College of Girls of Adapazar in 1898, Kavaljian left for the United States since in the Ottoman Empire women were not allowed to study medicine. In 1903 she graduated from the University of Illinois College of Medicine and in 1904 she returned to Adapazar and worked as a doctor with her father meanwhile she taught biology at the American College.

During World War I Kavaljian worked in the institutions providing assistance to the wounded. In 1921 Zaruhi, together with American College of Girls of Adapazar, moved to Üsküdar district of Istanbul.

Alongside medicine, Zaruhi taught at the American Girls’ College of Üsküdar where she was known as Dector Kaval.

== Death ==
Zaruhi died on June 10, 1969. She is buried in the Armenian Protestant Cemetery of Ferriccio.
