= Göksel Kalaycıoğlu =

Turkish politician (born 1936)

Member of the Parliament
- In office 6 November 1983 – 20 October 1991

Personal details
- Born: 1936 (age 89–90) Ankara, Turkey
- Party: Motherland Party
- Education: Virginia Intermont College

Göksel Kalaycıoğlu (born 1936) is a Turkish politician. She served as a deputy from the Motherland Party for two terms in the period between 1983 and 1991.

== Biography ==
Kalaycıoğlu was born in Ankara in 1936. She obtained a degree in education from the Virginia Intermont College, U.S.A. Following her graduation she worked as a translator and researcher in Turkey and in other countries, including Germany and the U.S.A.

Kalaycıoğlu joined the Motherland Party. In November 1983 general elections she was elected as a deputy from the party representing Ankara. She was also elected in the next general election held in 1987 and served at the Parliament until 1991.

Following her retirement Kalaycıoğlu settled in Alaçatı, İzmir. In 2019 she was named by the Güzelbahçe branch of the Association of Republican Women as the mother of the year.
