= Demiroğlu Bilim University =

Private university in İstanbul, Turkey

- Motto: "University to be exceptional in medicine field with quality and experience of Florence Nightingale Hospitals"
- Type: Private
- Established: 2006
- Affiliations: Erasmus Exchange Programme
- Dean: Prof. Dr. Çavlan Çiftçi
- Students: 2486
- Location: Istanbul, Turkey; 41°04′09″N 29°00′44″E
- Website: demiroglu.bilim.edu.tr

Demiroğlu Bilim University is a private university located in Istanbul, Turkey. It was established in 2006 by the Turkish Cardiology Foundation.
