= Sabancı =

Sabancı may refer to:

== People ==
- Sabancı family, dynasty of Turkish businesspeople founded by Hacı Ömer Sabancı
- Ali Sabancı
- Hacı Sabancı
- Mehmet Sabancı
- Özdemir Sabancı
- Şevket Sabancı

== Other uses ==
- Sabancı University, private research institution located in Istanbul, Turkey
- Sakıp Sabancı Museum, private fine arts museum in Istanbul, Turkey
- Sabancı Holding, the second largest industrial and financial conglomerate in Turkey
