= İhsan Sabancı =

Turkish businessman

- Born: 1931; Akçakaya village, Kayseri Province
- Died: 1979 (aged 47–48)
- Organization: Sabancı Holding
- Children: Güler Sabancı, inter alia
- Parent: Hacı Ömer Sabancı (father)

İhsan Sabancı (1931–1979) was a Turkish businessman and a second-generation member of the Sabancı family.

He was born in 1931 in the village of Akçakaya village in Kayseri Province as the first of six sons of Hacı Ömer Sabancı and Sadıka. His brothers were Sakıp (1933–2004), Hacı (1935–1998), Şevket (1936–2021), Erol (1938–) and Özdemir (1941–1996), all of whom contributed to the growth of a business imperium from nothing, founded by their father.

İhsan dropped out of school, and was a passionate football player in his youth. Unlike his father and brothers, he was not much interested in business. With his father's backing, he dealt with textile and cotton purchasing until 1975, during the time his family's major business was cotton trade. However, he spent most of his time at the Demirspor football club's facilities in Adana.

He married Yüksel in 1953, with whom he had two daughters, Güler (born 1955 in İstanbul) and Nur, and a son, Ahmet Yakup. İhsan had also three more children from his second marriage (religious marriage) with Nevin Tenik in Adana, two daughters, Sevgi Sabancı and Sevilay Sabancı (born 1966), and a son, Murat Sabancı (born 1967).

İhsan Sabancı died in 1979 at a young age of 48. After the death in 2004 of İhsan's brother Sakıp, who led the family-controlled Sabancı Holding, İhsan's daughter Güler Sabancı was appointed the chairperson of the second-biggest industrial and financial conglomerate of Turkey.
