= Ömer Sabancı =

Turkish businessman

- Born: 1959 (age 66–67); Adana, Turkey
- Education: Economics
- Alma mater: University of Delaware, Newark, Delaware, USA
- Organization: Densa Holding
- Spouse: Arzu Sabancı
- Children: 3
- Parent(s): Hacı Sabancı; Özcan Sabancı

Ömer Sabancı (born 1959) is a Turkish businessman and a member of Turkey's second-wealthiest Sabancı family in third generation in Turkey.

== Biography ==
He was born 1959 in Adana as the first son of Hacı Sabancı (1935–1998), son of Hacı Ömer Sabancı (1906–1966), the founder of Turkey's second-largest industrial and financial conglomerate Sabancı Holding. After finishing high school at Tarsus American College in Tarsus, province Mersin, he was educated in Economics at the University of Delaware in Newark, Delaware, United States.

Ömer Sabancı worked first in a number of family-owned companies in Europe. Upon returning to Turkey, he was promoted to the top management in SaSA, and held this position for 15 years. In 2000, he initiated a joint venture with DuPont for polyester fabric production, and became president of the newly founded DupontSA.

Ömer Sabancı was elected chairman of the Turkish Businesspeople Association (TÜSİAD) on January 22, 2004, and his term ended in January 2007. He is also president of the European Association of Synthetic fibers Industrialists (CIRFS), headquartered in Brussels, Belgium.

He has left his duties in the Sabancı Holding, the family business. He has started his own businesses. He has made partnerships with Demir Sabanci and Yalcin Sabanci. They have founded Doysa VIP Air, Inc., a private jet charter company. He has shares in Odesa Polymer, a company which produces and exports Turkey's only recyclable foldable crates. They are manufactured at Odesa Polymer's plant, located at Duzce Industrial Zone, directed by Dr. Naim H. Alemdaroglu. Furthermore, he owns an electronic retailing company, Electroworld Turkey. He has been listed as a billionaire by Forbes. The majority of his wealth comes from his stakes in the family company Sabancı Holding and its subsidiary, the largest private bank in Turkey, Akbank. He also has stakes in several subsidiaries of Sabancı Holding.

He married Arzu in 1986 and has three children; Hacı Sabancı (born 1987), Hakan Sabancı (born 1991), and Kerim Sabancı (born 1996). Hacı, after finishing Saint-Benoit French high school, continued education at Tufts University in the US and achieved his bachelor's degree in economics.

He is the elder brother of the late Mehmet Sabancı and Demet Çetindoğan.
