= Dinçer =

Dinçer is a surname of Turkish origin. People with the name include:

- Haluk Dinçer (born 1962), Turkish businessman
- Kemal Dinçer (born 1963), Turkish basketball player
- Ömer Dinçer (born 1956), Turkish politician
- Semra Dinçer (actress) (1965-2021), Turkish actress
- Semra Dinçer (politician), Turkish politician (born 1966)
- Suzan Sabancı Dinçer (born 1965), Turkish businesswoman
