= Mehmet Sabancı =

Turkish businessman

- Born: April 25, 1963; Adana, Turkey
- Died: November 9, 2004 (aged 41); London, United Kingdom
- Resting place: Zincirlikuyu Cemetery, Istanbul
- Education: Business administration
- Alma mater: US International University Europe, London, UK
- Organization: Doysa VIP Air
- Spouse: Zeynep Sabancı
- Children: 2
- Parent(s): Hacı Sabancı; Özcan Sabancı

Mehmet Sabancı (April 25, 1963 – November 9, 2004), a member in third generation of the renowned Sabancı family in Turkey, was a businessman.

Mehmet was born on April 25, 1963, in Adana as the third child and the second son of Hacı Sabancı (1935–1998). His father was the son of Hacı Ömer Sabancı (1906–1966), the founder of Sabancı Holding, the second largest industrial and financial conglomerate of Turkey. After he finished the high school at Tarsus American College in Tarsus, province Mersin, he was educated in Business Administration at US International University Europe in London, UK.

He worked from 1983 on 18 years long at several posts in the family owned Akbank and Sabancı Holding. In 2001, he quit his high ranked position in the holding as head of the food group with US$1.3 billion turnover, and started his own business in upper class car trade representing Smart, Aston Martin, Cadillac, Porsche, Brabus Mercedes-Benz, Startech Chrysler, MG and Rover brands. Later, he extended his business interests to food, electronics and petroleum products under the roof of his F&B-Group Company.

Mehmet Sabancı died of a heart attack on November 9, 2004, in a hotel room during a business trip in London at age 41. His corpse was brought to Turkey and was buried in Zincirlikuyu Cemetery in İstanbul. He and his wife Zeynep and two sons, Faruk and Burak. He was brother of Ömer Sabancı, former chairman of the prestigious "Turkish Businesspeople Association" TÜSİAD, and Demet Cetindogan, member of the board of textile giant Bossa.
