= Suzan Sabancı =

Turkish businesswoman (born 1965)

Suzan Sabancı CBE
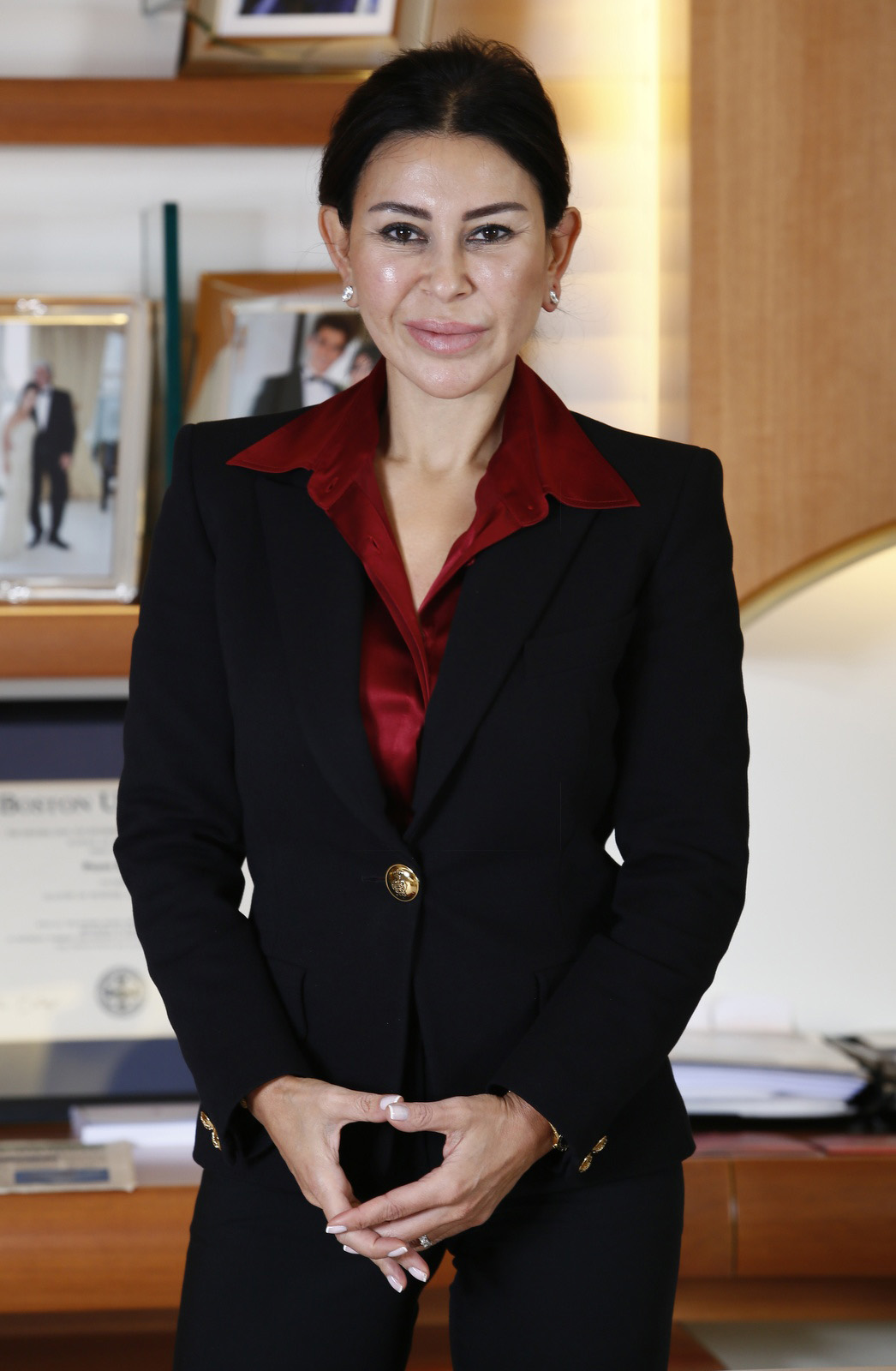
- Born: 1965 (age 60–61); Istanbul, Turkey
- Other name: Suzan Sabancı Dinçer
- Citizenship: Turkey; Malta
- Education: Richmond American University London (BA); Boston University (MBA)
- Occupation: Businesswoman
- Board member of: Akbank (chairperson); Sabancı Holding
- Spouse: Haluk Dinçer (div. 2023)
- Children: 2
- Parents: Erol Sabancı (father); Belkıs Sabancı (mother)
- Family: Sabancı family

Suzan Sabancı, CBE (Turkish pronunciation: [suˈzan saˈbaːndʒɯ]; formerly Sabancı Dinçer [dinˈtʃæɾ]; born 1965), is a Turkish businesswoman and a member of the Sabancı family in third generation. She is currently chairperson of Akbank, as well as board member of Sabancı Holding. Suzan Sabancı is the 26th wealthiest person in Turkey according to Forbes Türkiye.

Suzan Sabancı, specializing in treasury and risk management since 1993, also serves as a board member of the Institute of International Finance and is a member of the Advisory Board for Emerging Markets. She is also an international advisory board member for the National Bank of Kuwait and a member of the International Advisory Board for Blackstone.

== Education ==
Suzan Sabancı holds a Bachelor of Arts degree in Finance and International Marketing from Richmond, The American International University in London and an MBA degree from Boston University in the United States.

== Career ==
Suzan Sabancı is the chairperson of Akbank. Sabancı is also a board member of Sabancı Holding and a member of the board of trustees of Sabancı University. In 2009, Sabancı founded the Akbank International Advisory Board and currently serves as its chairperson.

Suzan Sabancı began her career in banking in 1986 and joined Akbank as executive vice-president in charge of treasury in 1989. In 1997, she was named executive board member for treasury and international banking relations. Sabancı was appointed as executive board member to oversee the bank-wide change and transition program in 2001. She was appointed chairperson in March 2008.

Sabancı also served as the chairperson of the advisory board of Women on Board Association Turkey.

== Memberships ==
Sabancı is a member of the Institute of International Finance Board of Directors and Emerging Markets Advisory Board, Harvard University's Global Advisory Council, Harvard Business School's Global Leaders Circle, Harvard Kennedy School Mossavar-Rahmani Center for Business and Government's Advisory Council and an emeritus member of the Harvard Business School's Middle East and North Africa Advisory Board. Suzan Sabancı is also a member of the Global Board of Advisors at the Council on Foreign Relations (CFR), and a member of the Board of Managing Directors of Venetian Heritage, Inc.

From 2010 to 2014, Suzan Sabancı served as the chairperson of the Turkish-British Business Council for two terms. From 2009 to 2016, Sabancı sat on the Global Board of Advisors of Chatham House. In 2012, Queen Elizabeth II appointed Sabancı as a Commander of the Most Excellent Order of the British Empire (CBE) in recognition of her significant contributions to the development of relations between Turkey and the United Kingdom.

Suzan Sabancı is strongly committed to corporate social responsibility activities and assumes various positions in the fields of culture, education, and the promotion of entrepreneurship. She is a founding member and board member of the leading high-impact entrepreneurship movement, Endeavor Turkey, and a member of the board of patrons of the Contemporary Istanbul Art Fair. Sabancı served as the Honorary Consul of Luxembourg in Istanbul for 17 years from 2005 to 2022. In 2014, Sabancı was given the Order of Civil Merit (Spanish: Orden del Mérito Civil) of the Kingdom of Spain by King Felipe VI for her contributions to the relations between the two countries and for her support to the cultural convergence.

Furthermore, Suzan Sabancı currently serves as a patron of King’s Trust International, a charitable organization established by King Charles III, then Prince of Wales, in 1976 with the aim of promoting the development of young people.

== Personal life ==
Sabancı has two children with her former husband Haluk Dinçer.
