= Semra Dinçer =

Semra Dinçer may refer to one of the following people:

- Semra Dinçer (actress)
- Semra Dinçer (politician)
