= Emine Sabancı Kamışlı =

Turkish businesswoman

- Born: 1966 (age 59–60); Adana, Turkey
- Education: Economics London School of Economics and Political Science
- Organization: Esas Holding
- Parent(s): Şevket Sabancı; Hayırlı Zerrin Sabancı

Emine Sabancı Kamışlı (born 1966) is a Turkish billionaire businesswoman and a third-generation member of the Sabancı family. She is the co-founder of Esas Group, a multi billion dollar alternative investment firm based in Istanbul, Turkey, and London, UK.

== Early years ==
She was born in Adana, Turkey as the second child of billionaire and philanthropist Şevket Sabancı (1936–2021). Between 1984 and 1987, she studied economics at London School of Economics and Political Science in London, United Kingdom. She then worked in Willis Towers Watson for two years as an analyst.

== Career ==
Upon her return to Turkey she started working at her family's insurance company Aksigorta, and eventually became the CEO of the firm. She also served on the board of her family's conglomerate Sabancı Holding. In 2001, Kamışlı quit her roles at Sabancı Holding, and co-founded Esas Holding with her father Şevket Sabancı. She is currently the vice-chair of Esas Holding, with her brother Ali Sabancı as chairman and H. Çağatay Özdoğru as chief executive officer.
