= Endürlük =

Neighborhood (formerly a village) in the Talas district of Kayseri Province, Turkey

Endürlük is a neighborhood (formerly a village) in the Talas district of Kayseri Province, Turkey. It was formerly a Turkish-speaking Orthodox village, also called Andronik, Andronike, or Androniki, as well as Endüllük or Enderlik.

Endürlük faces the southern slopes of Mt. Ali and is located 13 kilometers from the city center of Kayseri.

Its population is 320 (2025), and its surface area is 5.912 square kilometers.

It is bordered by the Harman neighborhood of the Talas district on the north, the Akçakaya neighborhood of the Talas district on the east, the Kıranardı neighborhood of the Melikgazi district on the south and west, and the Erenköy neighborhood of the Melikgazi district on the northwest.

== History ==
In the 1500s, Endürlük was part of the nahiye of Cebel-i Erciyes (the Mt. Erciyes district). In the census of 1500, 27 non-Muslim households were counted, while in the census of 1520, 1 Muslim and 44 non-Muslim households were counted.

In June 1728, villagers of neighboring Kıranardı filed complaints of banditry against villagers of Endürlük.

In the census of 1834, 22 households were counted, with a Muslim population of 110, while in the census of 1875, 684 households were counted, with 1264 Greek Christians, 67 male Muslims, and a total population of 3420. In an annual report (salname) of 1878, 684 households again were counted, with 1264 Greeks and 67 Muslims, but with a total population of 1331.

The Christians of Endürlük were sent to Greece in 1924 as part of the population exchange between Greece and Turkey. Albanian migrants from the Balkans who had first been settled in Konya were settled in Endürlük between 1924 and 1926. In 1935, the village's population was 429, and in 1940, it was 411.

== Notable people ==
Endürlüklü Abraham (Abraham of Endürlük) wrote the book Acının Kapısı in Karamanli (Turkish language written in Greek letters), published in Istanbul in 1818.

Saz player and singer Ahmet Gazi Ayhan (1921-1987) was born in Endürlük, but grew up in Akçakaya.
