= Güler Sabancı =

Turkish businesswoman

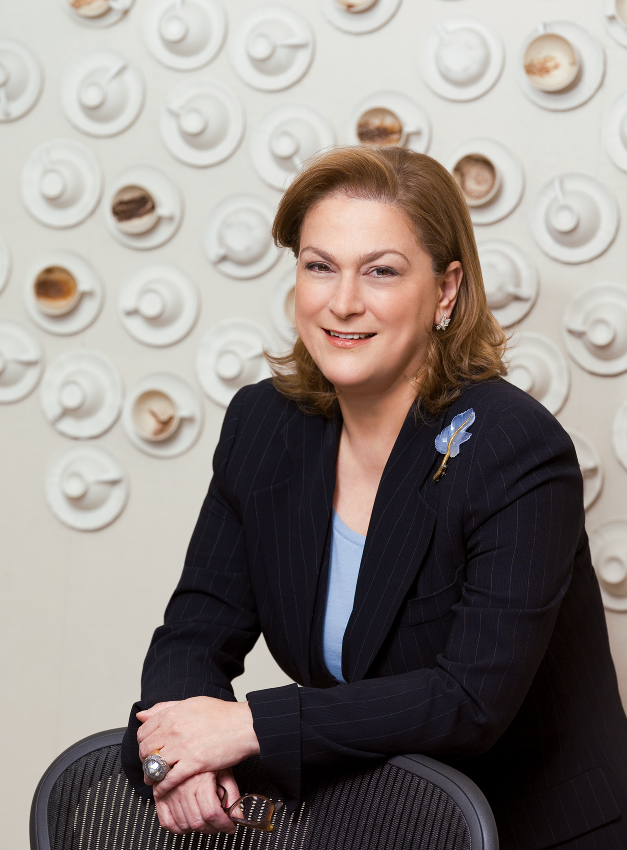
- Born: 1955 (age 70–71); Adana, Turkey
- Education: TED Ankara College
- Alma mater: Boğaziçi University
- Occupation: Businesswoman
- Organization: Sabancı Holding
- Parent(s): İhsan Sabancı; Yüksel (Tarcan) Sabancı

Güler Sabancı (born 1955) is a Turkish businesswoman, a third-generation member of the Sabancı family, and the former chair of the family-controlled Sabancı Holding, the second-largest industrial and financial conglomerate in Turkey. As of 2023, she was listed as the 77th most powerful woman in the world by Forbes, which first recognized her in 1999.

== Early life ==
Güler was born the daughter and first child of İhsan Sabancı and his wife Yüksel in 1955 in Adana, Turkey. After finishing high school at TED Ankara College in Ankara, she was educated in business administration at Boğaziçi University in Istanbul.

== Career ==
In 1978, she started her professional career at LasSA, a family-owned tire production company in Kocaeli Province. She was then appointed general manager of KordSA, a position she held for 14 years. Later, she became a member of the board of directors at Sabancı Holding, heading the tires and reinforcement materials group, as well as having responsibility for human resources.

Güler Sabancı was the chairwoman and managing director of Sabancı Holding. She is the founding president of the Sabancı University and also acts as chairman of the Sakip Sabancı Museum and chairwoman of the board of trustees of the Sabancı Foundation, the leading private foundation in Turkey. She is the first and only female member of European Round Table of Industrialists (ERT). In October 2013, she was named 2nd on Fortune's 50 Most Powerful Women in Business (outside USA). She has received several awards for philanthropy and leadership including the David Rockefeller Bridging Leadership Award, the Clinton Global Citizen Award, a Raymond Georis Innovative Philanthropist Award and a European School of Management Responsible Leadership Award.

In 2012, Sabancı was appointed a member of the board of United Nations Global Compact, the UN's highest-level advisory body involving business, civil society, labour and employers organizations.

She was listed as the 76th most powerful woman in the world by Forbes in 2022 and 77th in 2023.

She is a member of the Trilateral Commission.

== Awards, decorations and honorary degrees ==
- 2023 European Sustainability Award – Prix Film4Climate
- Fortune's 50 Most Powerful Women in Business (outside USA)
- David Rockefeller Bridging Leadership Award
- Clinton Global Citizen Award
- Raymond Georis Innovative Philanthropist Award
- European School of Management Responsible Leadership Award

== Personal life ==
Sabancı is notably private about her personal life, purposefully keeping quiet about her relationships. As of 2021, she was in a relationship with Eda Taşpınar.
