= Skandos =

Town of ancient Cappadocia

Coordinates: 38°43′51″N 35°24′02″E

Skandos was a town of ancient Cappadocia, inhabited in Byzantine times.

Its site is located near Talas, Asiatic Turkey.
