= Hacı Sabancı =

Turkish businessman and philanthropist

- Born: 25 June 1935; Akçakaya village, Kayseri Province, Turkey
- Died: 26 June 1998 (aged 63); Istanbul
- Resting place: Adana Asri Cemetery
- Organization: Sabancı Holding
- Spouse: Özcan Sabanci
- Children: 3, including Ömer and Mehmet
- Parent(s): Hacı Ömer Sabancı; Sadıka Sabancı

Hacı Sabancı (25 June 1935 – 26 June 1998) was a Turkish businessman, philanthropist, and second-generation member of the renowned Sabancı family.

He was born in the Akçakaya village of Kayseri Province as the third son of Hacı Ömer Sabancı, who founded Turkey's second largest industrial and financial conglomerate, Sabancı Holding.

Hacı went to school and spent most of his life in Adana. After dropping out of the secondary school, he started his career in the family-owned automobile dealing and cotton exporting companies. He later served at several top management posts in different companies of Sabancı Holding. He was also president of the board of trustees of Sabancı Foundation VakSA.

== Family ==
He married Özcan in 1959. They had two sons, Ömer in 1959 and Mehmet in 1963, and a daughter, Demet. Mehmet died of a heart attack in 2005.

== Death ==
Hacı Sabancı died on 26 June 1998, the day after his 63rd birthday, in Istanbul after a two-year struggle against lung cancer. He was laid to rest in Adana next to his murdered brother Özdemir.

== Honorary doctorates ==
- Çukurova University, Adana
- East Mediterranean University, Northern Cyprus

== Awards ==
- Order of Supreme Merit of Turkey presented by President Süleyman Demirel
- "Best Trading Executive of the Balkans" by the International Association of Business Administration

== Links ==
- Our unforgettables at Sabancı Holding website
