= Tufanbeyli power station =

Coal fired power station in Turkey

- Country: Turkey
- Coordinates: 38°11′09″N 36°16′07″E
- Status: Operational
- Commission date: 2015
- Owners: E.ON; Sabancı Holding

Thermal power station
- Primary fuel: Lignite

Power generation
- Nameplate capacity: 450 MW
- Annual net output: 3,283 GWh (2019); 3,410 GWh (2020); 3,449 GWh (2021); 3,466 GWh (2022)

External links
- Website: www.enerjisauretim.com.tr/faaliyetlerimiz/elektrik-uretimi/tufanbeyli-linyit-santrali

Tufanbeyli power station is a 450 MW coal-fired power station in Turkey in Tufanbeyli, built in the 2010s, which burns lignite mined locally. The plant is 40% owned by Sabancı Holding via Enerjisa Enerji and 40% by E.ON and in 2022 received capacity payments. As of 2025 management plan to expand it.
