= Kepez, Talas =

Neighborhood in the district of Talas, Kayseri Province of Turkey

Kepez is a neighborhood in the district of Talas, Kayseri Province of Turkey. It is 23 kilometers by highway southeast from the center of Talas.

The neighborhood's land area is 33.828 square kilometers. Its population in 2023 was 2,528.

== History ==
A han was built, possibly in the 13th century, about 3 kilometers from the present village of Kepez. The complex included a small mosque. A spring to the south provided water. The han was known locally as Sarıhan (Yellow Han), even though it was built of brown stone. Because the structures had been quarried by local people for use in their own buildings, very little remained by 2017.

A Sheikh Seyfullah endowed a foundation in 1545 with income from the village of Kepez to support a mosque and school in Kayseri.

The village of Kepez included 63 households in 1875, with a population of 218 Turks but no Armenians or Greeks. The population was 258 females and 273 males, for a total of 531 in 1915, and 281 females and 283 males, for a total of 564 in 1935.
