= Bossa (company) =

Turkish textile company

Bossa Ticaret ve Sanayi İşletmeleri T.A.Ş.
- Type: A.Ş.
- Traded as: BİST: BOSSA
- Industry: Textiles
- Founded: 1951
- Headquarters: Adana, Turkey
- Area served: Turkey
- Number of employees: 1,788 (2024)
- Website: www.bossa.com.tr

Bossa Ticaret ve Sanayi Isletmeleri T.A.S. is a Turkish textile corporation. Bossa's shares have been listed on Borsa Istanbul since 1995.

== History ==
Bossa was founded in 1951 by Hacı Ömer Sabancı, operating a textile mill in Adana. Additional mills were opened in 1974, 1979, 1986, and 1990. In 1995, the company completed its initial public offering and was listed on Borsa Istanbul.

== Products ==
Bossa produces fabrics and denim for fashion labels such as Armani and Levi's. Bossa has also produced material for furniture.
