= Şevket Sabancı =

Turkish billionaire businessman and philanthropist (1936–2021)

- Born: 1936; Akçakaya Village, Kayseri Province, Turkey
- Died: 22 July 2021 (aged 85); Turkey
- Citizenship: Turkey
- Education: Textile engineering, University of Manchester Institute of Science and Technology
- Organization(s): Sabancı Holding, Esas Holding
- Notable work: Haci Omer Sabanci Foundation, Sabancı Holding, Sabancı University, Esas Holding
- Spouse: Hayırlı Zerrin Sabanci
- Children: 3, including Emine Sabancı Kamışlı and Ali İhsan Sabancı
- Parent(s): Hacı Ömer Sabancı; Sadıka Sabancı

Şevket Sabancı (1936 – 22 July 2021) was a Turkish billionaire businessman and philanthropist, and a second-generation member of the Sabancı family.

== Biography ==
He was born 1936 in Kayseri, Turkey, as the fourth son of Hacı Ömer Sabancı, a self-made wealthy trader, and Sadıka. Şevket was educated in textile engineering at the University of Manchester Institute of Science and Technology (UMIST) in England. Returning home, he worked at managerial positions in a number of textile companies owned by his family. After 1980, he went abroad to represent Sabancı Holding. In 2000 Şevket Sabancı founded Esas Holding, which is today the largest alternative investment firm in Turkey, managing close to $10 billion.

Şevket Sabancı was also a founding member of the Sabancı Foundation VakSA.

He was married to Hayırlı Zerrin, with whom he has two daughters Emine Kamışlı, Sadıka Sabancı, and a son Ali Sabancı.

He died at the age of 85 on 22 July 2021.

== Esas Holding ==
Esas Holding, Sabancı's family office, was founded in 2000, and is led by his daughter Emine Sabancı Kamışlı and son Ali Sabanci, with H. Çağatay Özdoğru as chief executive officer since 2010. As of 2021, total assets under management are estimated at $10 billion.

Esas Holding is based in Istanbul, Turkey with an additional office in London.
