= Erol Sabancı =

Turkish banker and billionaire

- Born: 1938 (age 87–88); Akçakaya village, Kayseri Province, Turkey
- Education: Manchester College of Commerce
- Organization(s): Akbank, Sabancı Holding
- Spouse: Belkıs Sabanci
- Children: 2, including Suzan
- Parents: Hacı Ömer Sabancı (father); Sadıka Sabancı (mother)

Erol Sabancı (born 1938) is a billionaire Turkish banker and a member of the Sabancı family. Sabancı is the honorary chairman of Akbank. He has been a board member of Akbank since 1963, Turkey's most valuable and profitable bank.

== Early life ==
Sabancı was born in Akçakaya village in central Turkey near the town of Kayseri in 1938, the fifth son of Hacı Ömer Sabancı, who laid the foundation of one of the greatest fortunes in the world, and Sadıka.

Sabancı completed his secondary education at the Tarsus American College. In 1956, he went to England to study at Manchester College of Commerce. Sabancı returned to Turkey in 1958 and the following year joined the army for his two-year military service.

== Career ==
In 1960, he joined his elder brothers at the holding company as manager of the family flour mill and the financial director of the textile firm Bossa.

In 1963, he was elected a board member of Akbank as representative of the Sabancı shares. At that time Akbank, which was formed by a group of industrialists in 1948, had 63 branches and was the smallest of the four large private banks. In 1966, the Sabancıs acquired majority control of Akbank.

In 1970, Sabancı quit his other positions in Sabancı Holding, except his chair at the board, and moved to Istanbul to become the managing director of Akbank. Four years later the headquarters of Sabancı Holding were moved to Istanbul.

Serving as a member of the board of directors and the vice chairman of the board since 1967, Sabancı held the position of chairman of the board from March 1998 to March 2008. Sabancı was elected honorary chairman and consultant to the board on March 28, 2008. Sabancı also serves as the vice chairman of the board of Sabancı Holding.

== Personal life ==
Sabancı is married to Belkıs and has two daughters, one of whom, Suzan Sabancı Dinçer, is chairman and executive board member of Akbank. Sabancı is a grandfather of four.
