= Kayseray =

Mainline route in turkey

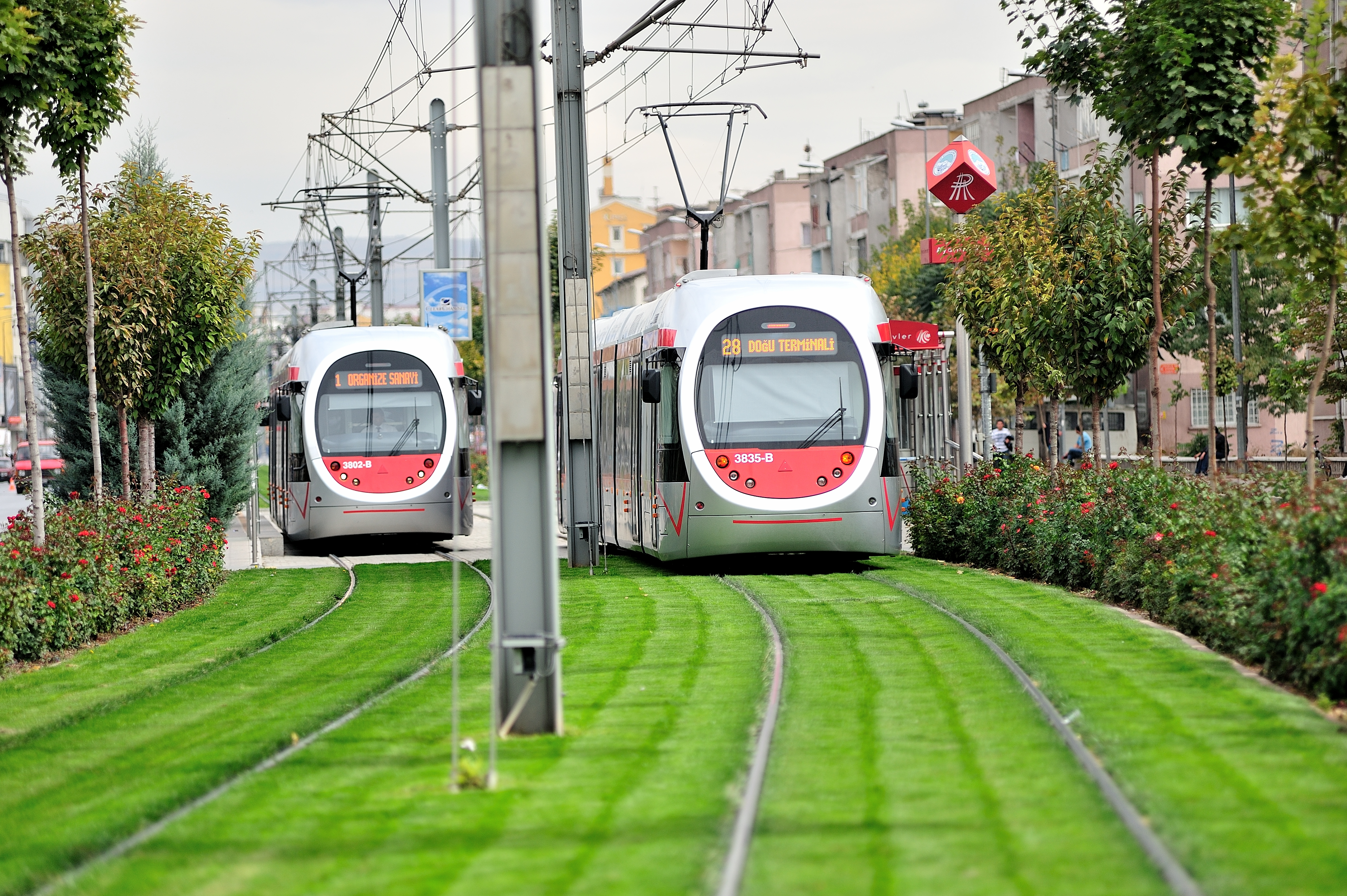

Overview
- Owner: Kayseri Metropolitan Municipality
- Locale: Kayseri
- Transit type: Light Rail
- Number of lines: 4
- Line number: T1, T2, T3, T4.
- Number of stations: 75
- Daily ridership: 90,000
- Website: http://www.kayseriulasim.com/

Operation
- Operation will start: 2009
- Operator: Kayseri Metropolitan Municipality
- Number of vehicles: 69
- Train length: 32/40 m

Technical
- System length: 46 km
- Track gauge: 1435 mm
- Electrification: Overhead lines
- Average speed: 62 km/h
- Top speed: 70 km/h

Kayseray (Turkish pronunciation: [ˈkajseɾaj]) is a light rail street-tram system operating in the city of Kayseri in Turkey. The tracks and station structures were completed and the line opened in 2009.

== History ==
The project began in January 2006, with a completion target of 1,065 days set. The initial proposal was a reaction to the growing traffic congestion in the central parts of the city, and to reduce this, a mass-transit tram link was planned to cut right across the area, allowing transportation of locals from one part of the region to the other.

When opened the initial length of the track was some 17 km, with a total of 28 stations (averaging a distance of 65m/each). Total journey time between each end of the line was expected to be in the region of 45 minutes. 22 trams were planned to be ordered initially.

The line was later extended eastward to İldem and a branch line was opened on 14-02-2014 to Talas via Erciyes Üniversitesi.

The construction of a third line between Anafartalar and Kumsmall Shopping Centre via the Kayseri City Hospital began on November 21, 2020. This branch opened on 2 March 2023.

The railway uses the same electronic travel card ticketing system as the city's bus transport system. Trains operate between 6:00 in the morning to 24:00 at night seven days a week.

== Current lines ==
Line	Termini	Number of Stops	Opening Date	Length (km)	Travel Time
T1	Organize Sanayi ↔ İldem 5	43	1 August 2009	27 km	70 minutes
T2	Cumhuriyet Meydanı ↔ Talas Cemil Baba	18	25 October 2014	10 km	30 minutes
T3	Kumsmall AVM ↔ İldem 5	49	2 March 2023	30 km	84 minutes
T4	Cumhuriyet Meydani ↔ Anayurt İzzet Bayraktar Camii	17	28 October 2023	9,7 km	29 minutes

== Rolling stock ==
=== Current ===
All services were initially provided by AnsaldoBreda Sirio trams. The fleet of 22 trams was later expanded to a total of 38.

An order for 30 additional trams from Turkish supplier Bozankaya was placed in August 2014 to augment the existing fleet. The first tram was delivered in March 2016, and all were in service by April 2017.

=== Former ===
Between 2015 and 2017, Gaziantep lent eight Alstom TFS trams (originally used in Rouen) to Kayseray.
