= Köy =

Western Oghuz term for village

Köy is the word for "village" in Western Oghuz languages that are geographically western, such as Turkish, Ottoman Turkish and Crimean Tatar. It is a loanword from Persian gūy (or probably more likely kūy), which originally means "path, street". In Ottoman toponymic history a multitude of settlements with köy are attested, such as Boghaz Köy or Ermeni Köy.

Toponyms with the word köy apparently came into use only after the end of the Seljuk period (1037–1194). For example, the word is not found in the Dīwān Lughāt al-Turk of Mahmud al-Kashgari (died 1102).

The meaning of köy within the concept of an open village contrasts with that of the word kasaba, which refers to a small town. In Western Oghuz languages located to the east, such as the dialect used by Iraqi Turkmens, the word "kend" (a Sogdian loanword) is used at all times when denoting a village rather than köy; however, the Islamologist and Ottomanist Johannes Hendrik Kramers adds that "sometimes this last word seems to have been replaced by köy". For instance, the settlement of Ḳāḍī Kend near Mosul changes into Ḳāḍī Köy.
