= Haluk Dinçer =

Turkish business executive (born 1962)

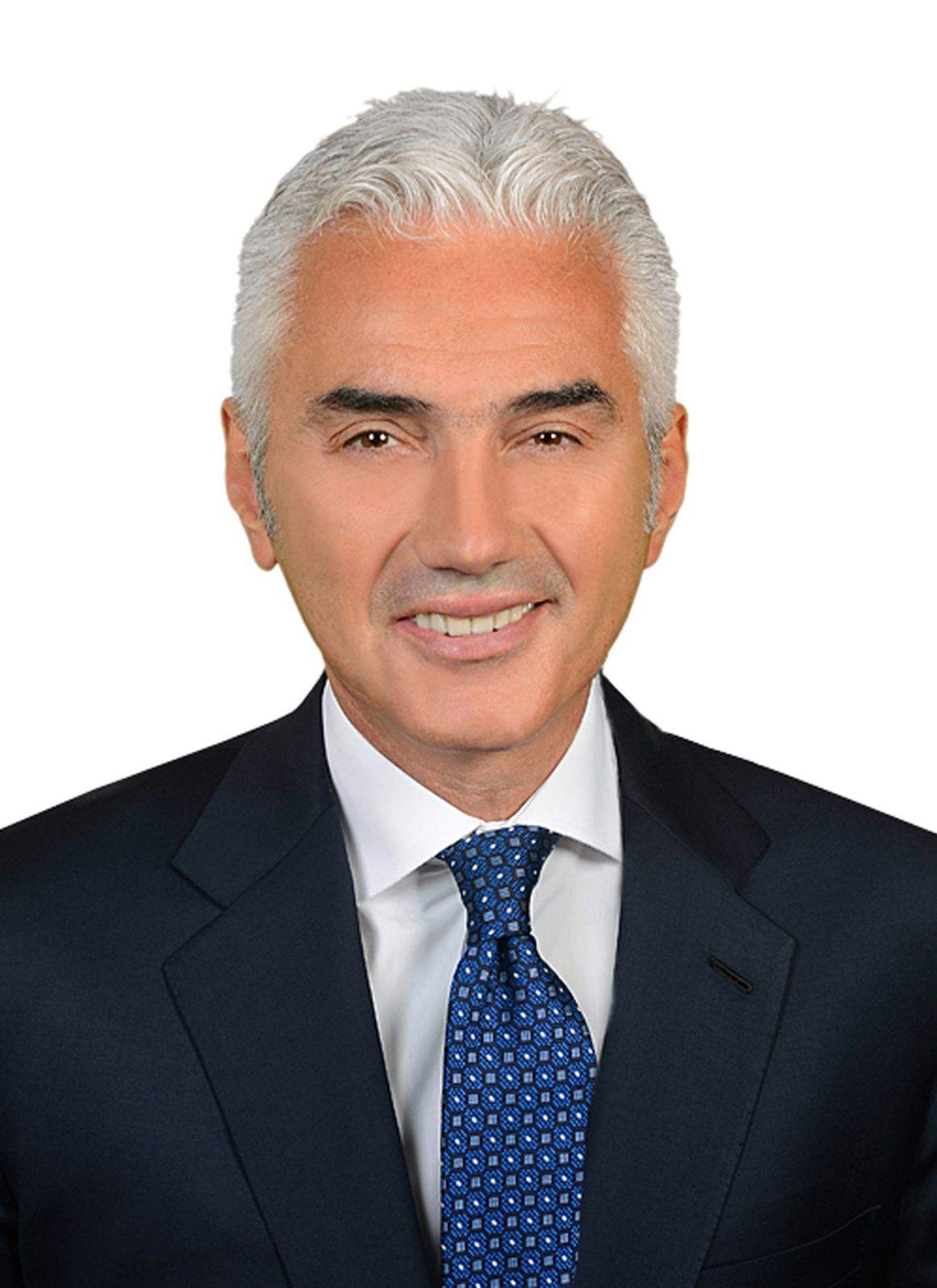
- Haluk Dinçer
- Born: 1962 (age 63–64); Istanbul, Turkey
- Education: Lycée Saint-Joseph, Istanbul; University of Michigan (BSE); Ross School of Business (MBA)
- Occupation: Business executive
- Children: 2

Haluk Dinçer (born 1962) is a Turkish business executive. He spent 30 years at the Sabancı Group, serving as a member of Sabancı Holding's Executive Board from 2002 to 2025 and, most recently, as Financial Services Group President. He served as president of TÜSİAD, the Turkish Industry & Business Association, from 2014 to 2015, and as chairman of the Turkish-American Business Council (TAİK) from 2008 to 2014.

== Early life and education ==
Dinçer attended Lycée Saint-Joseph, Istanbul. He received a bachelor's degree in mechanical engineering in 1985 and an MBA in 1988, both from the University of Michigan. He has two children.

== Career ==
Dinçer began his career in 1985 as a project engineer at the General Motors Technical Center in the United States. He joined the Sabancı Group in 1995 and held senior management positions at Temsa before moving to Sabancı Holding in 2001. He was appointed Food Group President and a member of the Holding's Executive Board in 2002, and over the following years advanced through a series of senior leadership roles — including Food and Retail Group President, Retail and Insurance Group President, and Insurance Group President — before being named Financial Services Group President in 2020. He remained a member of Sabancı Holding's Executive Board until March 2025. During his career at Sabancı Holding, Dinçer held chairmanship and board positions in several group companies and international joint ventures across the automotive, retail, insurance and financial-services sectors.

== Business and public roles ==
Dinçer served as president of TÜSİAD from 2014 to 2015, after previously serving as a vice president of the association. He also chaired the Turkish-American Business Council (TAİK), part of the Foreign Economic Relations Board of Turkey (DEİK), from 2008 to 2014. Dinçer has also participated in international business and policy organizations. He served on the International Advisory Council of the Brookings Institution and represented the Turkish business community at G20 Business Summits. He served on the board of the Global Relations Forum (GRF), an independent platform for international affairs, from 2018 to 2022. He has also been a member of the Geneva Association, an international insurance-industry research organization, since 2019.
