= Semra Dinçer (politician) =

Turkish politician (born 1966)

Member of the Grand National Assembly of Turkey
- Incumbent
- Assumed office 14 May 2023
- Constituency: Ankara (2nd electoral district)

Personal details
- Born: 1966 (age 59–60) Ankara
- Party: Republican People's Party
- Education: Gazi University

Semra Dinçer (born 1966 in Ankara) is a Turkish politician from the Republican People's Party. She graduated from Gazi University. She was elected to the Grand National Assembly of Turkey in the 2023 Turkish parliamentary election, representing Ankara's second electoral district.

== See also ==
- 28th Parliament of Turkey
