= Akbank =

Turkish bank

Akbank T.A.Ş.

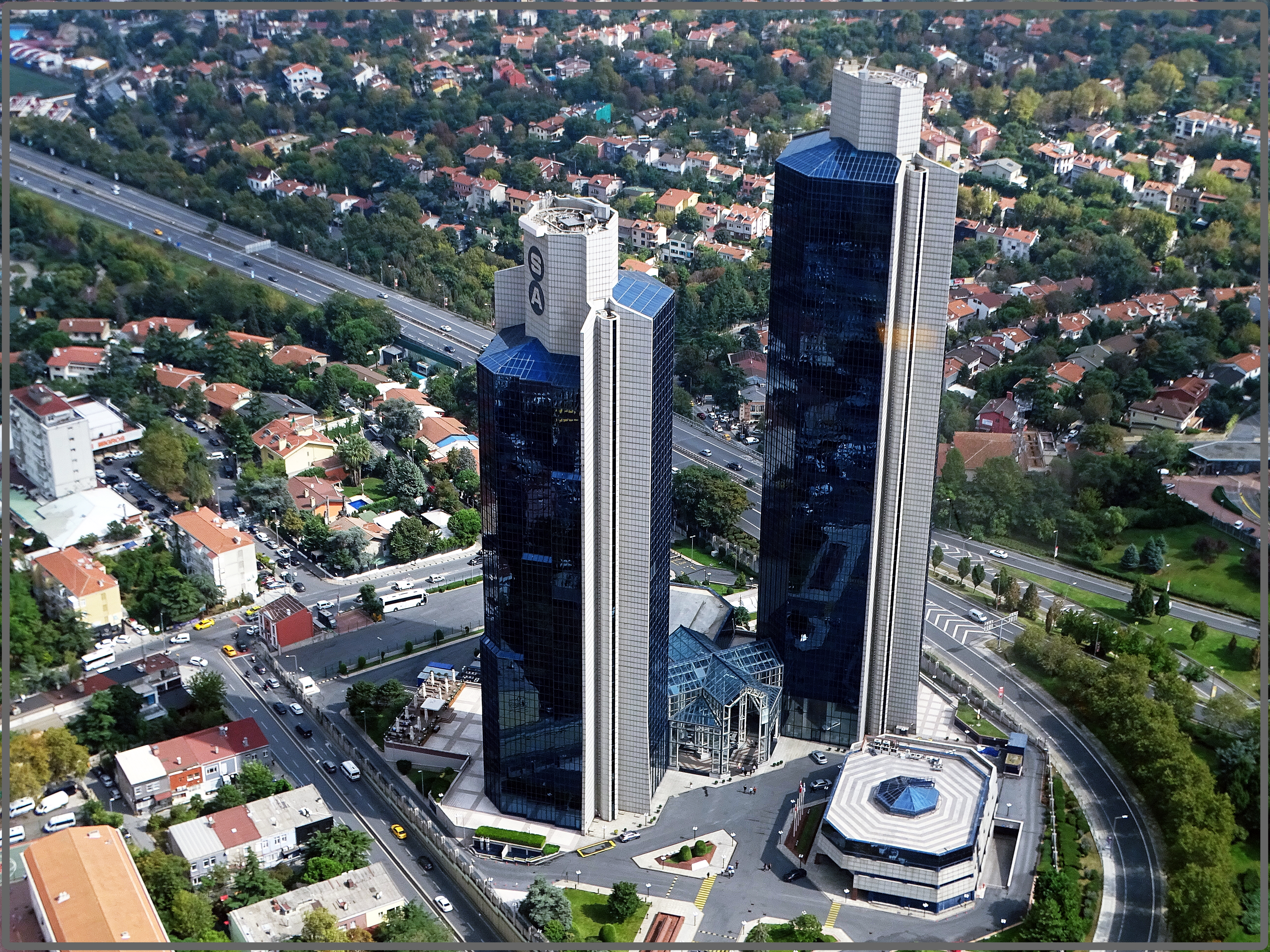
- Akbank Tower in Büyükdere, Istanbul
- Type: Anonim Şirket
- Traded as: BİST: AKBNK
- Industry: Banking, Financial services
- Founded: 30 January 1948; 78 years ago
- Headquarters: Akbank Tower, Büyükdere, Istanbul, Turkey
- Key people: Suzan Sabancı Dinçer (Chairman); Kaan Gür (CEO)
- Products: Financial services, credit cards, consumer banking, corporate banking, investment banking, mortgage loans, private banking
- Revenue: ▲US$14.50 billion (2024)
- Operating income: ▼US$1.50 billion (2024)
- Net income: ▼US$1.23 billion (2024)
- Total assets: ▲US$77.03 billion (2024)
- Total equity: ▼US$6.98 billion (2024)
- Number of employees: ~12.860 (2023)
- Subsidiaries: List: Akbank AG AK Lease AK Investment AK Asset Management
- Rating: S&P: unknown Moody's: B1; Fitch: BB-
- Website: www.akbank.com

Akbank T.A.Ş. is one of the prominent banks in Turkey. Founded in 30 January 1948, As of 2022, Akbank reported a consolidated net profit of TL 60 billion 26 million. Listed on the Borsa Istanbul, its largest shareholders are members of the Sabancı family. Akbank serves in the fields of corporate and investment banking, commercial banking, SME banking, consumer banking, payment systems, private banking, investment services and treasury transactions.

Akbank has ranked as "The Most Valuable Banking Brand in Turkey" according to the "Brand Finance: Banking 500, 2018" report for the seventh time in a row. Akbank also achieved significant success by ranking as the 126th most valuable banking brand in the report that comprises the most valuable global banking brands.

The bank's market cap significantly declined over a decade, resulting in value of $6.93B in 2026 from $14.9B in 2014.

== History ==
Akbank was founded in Adana, Turkey in January 1948, originally to provide financing for the cotton producers in the Çukurova region. As the majority of the bank founders were born in the city of Kayseri, the name "Adana-Kayseri Bankası" was chosen, soon to be shortened to its initials AK or Akbank. The founders were Hacı Ömer Sabancı, the industrialist brothers Ahmet Sapmaz and Bekir Sapmaz and the four owners of the Adana textile business Milli Mensucat; Nuh Naci Yazgan, Nuri Has, Mustafa Özgür and Seyit Tekin. This group had an 80% shareholding, with the remaining 20% offered to investors in Adana and Istanbul. Opening with a single branch in a corner of Adana Akbank grew and developed quickly, opening its first branch in Istanbul in the district of Sirkeci on 14 July 1950, and moving its headquarters to Istanbul in 1954. The original founders ran the bank until 1962 when it was taken over by Sabancı family. Rapidly increasing the number of its branches, Akbank automated all banking operations in 1963.

On 9 January 2007, Akbank and Citigroup completed the strategic partnership agreement, according to which Citigroup acquired a 20% equity stake in Akbank for approximately US$3.1 billion (TRL 0.095 per share).

In 2013, Citigroup sold a 10.1% stake in Akbank as part of a move to prepare for the Basel III rule and technical reasons related to Citibank. Following this transaction, Citigroup's stake in Akbank was 9.9% but on 5 March 2015 Citi announced it was selling its remaining shares for $1.15 billion.

Akbank provides services to over 10.8 million active customers through Headquarters in Istanbul, Data and Life Center, 19 Regional Directorates in Turkey, 711 branches, and more than 12 thousand employees. Apart from the one-to-one service at branches, Akbank provides services through Akbank Internet, Akbank Mobile, Call Center, approximately 5900 ATMs, and 734 thousand POS terminals (including virtual POS) for customers. In addition to the foregoing, Akbank has international operations through subsidiary Akbank AG in Germany and a branch in Malta by drawing strength from Akbank’s reputable identity in Turkey.

As of 31 December 2022, Akbank reported a consolidated net profit of TL 60 billion 26 million and total consolidated assets of TL 1 trillion 147 billion. The consolidated capital adequacy ratio of Akbank, standing at approx 23.2%.

Akbank had several system failures in its history. First systemic one was in 2017 where its whole infrastructure stopped working. Similar incidents happened, but not limited to, 2021, 2022 and in 2024. While it is not common in Turkey, Akbank's frequent system outages caused millions of its customers not being pay at POS terminals or transfer funds.

== Awards ==
- Best Bank of Turkey EUROMONEY (2013–2023)
- Best Bank of Turkey GLOBAL FINANCE (2014–2023)
- World's Best Digital Bank EUROMONEY (2019)
- Digital Solutions Market Leader in Turkey EUROMONEY (2022)
- Best Bank for SMEs in CEE EUROMONEY (2023)
- Best Bank for Sustainable Finance in Turkey GLOBAL FINANCE (2023)
- Best Bank for Trade Finance in Turkey EUROMONEY (2020)
- Best Private Bank in Turkey GLOBAL FINANCE (2023)
- World’s Best Bank in the Emerging Markets EUROMONEY (2020)
- Corporate Banking Market Leader in Turkey EUROMONEY (2022)
- Best IR Program in Turkey for BIST 30 Category INSTITUTIONAL INVESTOR (2020–2021)

== Operations ==
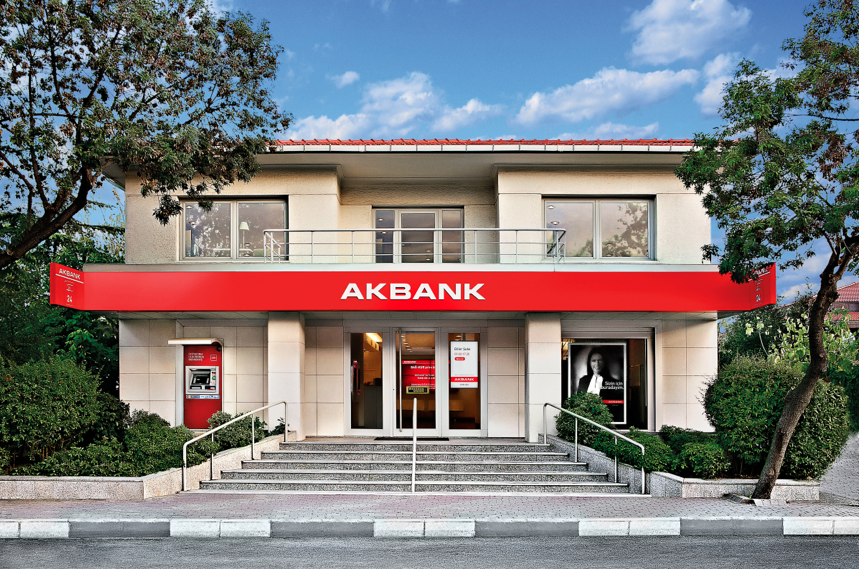
Akbank, Etiler branch

As of 2008, Akbank ranked as Turkey's most valuable bank, having the most profitable banking operations among privately owned banks in Turkey. Also, Akbank is one of the largest banks in Turkey in terms of loan volume.

Together with its core banking activities, Akbank offers a wide range of retail, commercial, corporate, private banking and international trade finance services. Non-banking financial services, as well as capital market and investment services, are provided by the Bank's subsidiaries.

It has a domestic distribution network that includes over 800 branches and around 14,000 employees, Akbank operates from its headquarters in Istanbul and 20 regional directorates around Turkey. Akbank provides services not only through its branches, which include "Credit Express" consumer loan only branches and "Big Red House" mortgage loan only branches, but also through Retail and Corporate Internet Branches, the Telephone Banking Center, 4,550 ATMs, 510,000 POS terminals.

Akbank is listed on the Istanbul Stock Exchange (ISE) where approx. 51.1% of its shares are publicly traded. Akbank shares constitute 4.9% of the total BIST 100 market capitalization and 16.9% of the total market capitalization of banks listed on BIST as of June 2018.

Akbank has been conducting overseas activities through its subsidiaries in Germany (Akbank A.G.), and a branch in Malta.

== Management Board & Group Executive Committee ==
Board of Directors			Executive Management
Name	Since	Position	Name	Since	Position
Suzan Sabancı Dinçer	2008	Chairman and Executive Board Member	Hakan Binbaşgil	2012	CEO and board member
Erol Sabancı	2008	Honorary Chairman and Consultant to the Board - Board Member	Hayri Çulhacı	2010	Vice Chairman & Executive Board Member
Can Paker	2015	Board Member	Bülent Oğuz	2011	Executive Vice President - SME Banking
Eyüp Engin	2007	Head of Internal Audit	Yaman Törüner	1998	Board Member
Aykut Demiray	2012	Board Member	Arif İsfendiyaroğlu	2015	Executive Vice President - Consumer Banking and Payment Systems
Emre Derman	2015	Board Member	Levent Çelebioğlu	2015	Executive Vice President - Corporate and Investment Banking
Aydın Günter	2015	Board Member	Ege Gültekin	2015	Executive Vice President - Credit Monitoring and Follow Up
Hakan Binbaşgil	2012	Board Member	Burcu Civelek Yüce	2014	Executive Vice President - Human Resources and Strategy
Dr. Joseph Ackerman	2013	Chairman's Advisor	Tolga Ulutaş	2016	Executive Vice President - Direct Banking
Ahmet Fuat Ayla	2017	Executive Board Member	İlker Altıntaş	2017	Executive Vice President - Technology and Operations
Hasan Recai Anbarcı	2017	Executive Vice President - Credit Allocation	Mehmet Tugal	2017	Executive Vice President - Commercial Banking
Türker Tunalı	2017	Executive Vice President - CFO	Ali Karaali	2017	Executive Vice President - Treasury
Dr. Alp Keler	2018	Executive Vice President - Private Banking and Investment Systems	Prof. Dr. Özgür Demirtaş	2017	Board Member
Ahmet Fuat Ayla	2017	Executive Board Member

== Principal subsidiaries ==
- Ak Asset Management
- Ak Lease
- Ak Investment
- Akbank AG

== See also ==
- Sabancı Holding
- Akbank Sanat
- List of banks in Turkey
- List of companies of Turkey
