= Semra Dinçer (actress) =

Turkish actress (1965–2021)

- Born: 25 July 1965; Ankara, Turkey
- Died: 1 November 2021 (aged 56); Istanbul, Turkey
- Occupation: Actress
- Years active: 1984–2021
- Children: 1

Semra Dinçer (25 July 1965 – 1 November 2021) was a Turkish actress.

Dinçer was born in 1965, in Ankara. Despite not receiving a formal education in acting, she started her career in 1984 with a leading role in TRT series Köşe Dönücü. She was best known for her role in the series Kuzey Güney as Handan Tekinoğlu. She also served as a scriptwriter in seven movies and appeared in more than 42 films and TV series.

Dinçer died on 1 November 2021, after suffering from lung cancer for two years. Her body was buried in the Osmaniye Village Cemetery in Ankara's Sincan district.

== Filmography ==
Title	Role	Type	Year
Köşe Dönücü		TV series	1984
Barışta Savaşanlar		TV series	1993
Suçlu Kim		TV series	1994
Kaçıklık Diplomasi		Film	1998
Örümcek	Merve	TV series	1998
Kıvılcım		TV series	1999
Yılan Hikayesi	Cemile	TV series	1999
Filler ve Çimen		Film	2000
Gökten Düşen Hazine		Film	2000
Kimyacı		TV series	2000
Martılar ve İstanbul		TV film	2000
Profesyoneller		TV series	2000
Zehirli Çiçek		TV series	2000
İçimizden Biri		TV series	2000
Benim İçin Ağlama		TV series	2001
Tatlı Hayat	Mehpare	TV series	2001
Berivan		TV series	2002
Kumsaldaki İzler		TV series	2002
Kırık Ayna	Firdes	TV series	2003
Mihrali		TV series	2003
Fırtına Hayatlar		TV series	2004
Perçem		TV series	2004
Döngel Kerhanesi	Didar	Film	2005
Yolun Sonu		TV series	2005
Kaybolan Yıllar	Rosa	TV series	2006
Yağmurdan Sonra	Defne	TV series	2006
Geniş Zamanlar	Sıdıka	TV series	2007
Kavak Yelleri	Berrin	TV series	2008
Leylan	Sebahat	TV series	2007
Derman	Adalet	TV series	2008
Goncakaranfil		TV series	2008
Kardelen	Şermin	TV series	2008
Unutulmaz	Nazan	TV series	2010
Maskeli Balo		TV series	2010
Dinle Sevgili	Ülfet	TV series	2011
Kuzey Güney	Handan Tekinoğlu	TV series	2011
İstanbullu Gelin	Reyhan Sezgin	TV series	2017
Ağlama Anne	Kevser	TV series	2018
Bana Bir Aşk Şarkısı Söyle		Film	2019
Ağır Romantik		Film	2020
Kırmızı Oda	Hikmet	TV series	2020
