= Hacı Ömer Sabancı =

Turkish entrepreneur

- Born: 1 January 1906; Akçakaya Village, Kayseri, Ottoman Empire
- Died: 2 February 1966 (aged 60); Istanbul, Turkey
- Spouse: Sadıka Sabancı
- Children: İhsan Sabancı, Sakıp Sabancı, Hacı Sabancı, Şevket Sabancı, Erol Sabancı, Özdemir Sabancı

Hacı Ömer Sabancı (1 January 1906 – 2 February 1966) was a Turkish entrepreneur, who founded a number of companies, which later formed the second largest industrial and financial conglomerate of Turkey, the Sabancı Holding. He initiated the establishment of a dynasty of Turkey's wealthiest businesspeople.

== Early life ==
He was born the small Akçakaya village, in Kayseri in central Anatolia, Turkey. In 1921, a couple of years after the death of his father, the then fifteen-year-old youngster left his hometown and walked all the way to Adana to seek his fortune.

== Career ==
Hacı Ömer started his new life as a cotton picker. In Adana he took part in the confiscation of Armenian property and businesses after the Armenian genocide, which was encouraged by the Turkish government.

Soon, he became a broker for cotton harvesters. With the money he saved in a few years, Hacı Ömer entered the cotton trade, and in 1932 became a co-owner of a cotton spinning plant. At that time, the people working for him called him "Aga" ("Boss"). In 1943, he became a partner of YağSA, and in 1946 of MarSA, both production plants of vegetable oil and margarine, respectively. In 1948 Hacı Ömer established his own bank Akbank. In 1951 in Adana he founded the textile company Bossa, which became the largest integrated textile facility in Turkey. In the following years, he founded Oralitsa (1954), a roofing material factory, and Aksigorta (1960), an insurance company.

In 1928, he married Sadıka (1910–1988), who bore him six sons, İhsan (1931–1979), Sakıp (1933–2004), Hacı (1935–1998), Şevket (1936–2021), Erol (born 1938) and Özdemir (1941–1996). Hacı Ömer Sabancı and his family moved to Istanbul after purchasing, in 1951, a mansion known as Atlı Köşk (English: Equestrian Villa) on the European shore of Bosphorus in Emirgan. This house is used as the Sakıp Sabancı Museum today.

He died, a self-made rich man, on 2 February 1966 in İstanbul. He is commemorated by the holding company of the group, Hacı Ömer Sabancı Holding, which was founded in 1967 soon after his death in Adana. A charity institution, Hacı Ömer Sabancı Foundation (Turkish: Hacı Ömer Sabancı Vakfı, commonly abbreviated as VAKSA) was established also in 1974 in Adana and named after him. The foundation built, among other things, a high school sports hall in İstanbul, a cultural center in Adana, dormitories in Ankara and Adana, and primary schools in Kayseri and Van, which are dedicated to him.
