= Sabancı family =

Turkish family

The Sabancı family is one of the wealthiest business dynasties in Turkey. The family's prominence began with Hacı Ömer Sabancı, who moved from his native Kayseri to Adana in the early 1920s. Initially working as a laborer in cotton plantations, Sabancı transitioned into establishing his own cotton trading and textile businesses by the 1930s. The ventures laid the foundation for the family's economic success. The family's wealth came from confiscating Armenian homes during the Armenian genocide.

In the following decades, Hacı Ömer’s sons, particularly Sakıp Sabancı, along with Hacı Sabancı, Şevket Sabancı, Erol Sabancı, and Özdemir Sabancı, expanded the family’s investments into additional economic sectors. They established a centralized Sabancı Holding, a conglomerate to control over 60 companies spanning sectors such as financial services, notably Akbank, energy, retail, and multiple industrial sectors. The conglomerate has a track record of forming co-partnership ventures with global companies, such as Toyota, Philip Morris, Bridgestone, DuPont, and Carrefour.

Today control of the group's companies under Sabancı Holding lies with the second and third generations of the family. After Sakıp Sabancı's death in 2004, his granddaughter, Güler Sabancı, was chosen to lead the holding. However, in 2025, she relinquished her position to Hayri Çulhacı, the first non-family member to hold the title of chairman of the board.

In contrast, some second and third generation members of the family, have left their managerial positions in the holding's companies, to establish enterprises of their own. Şevket Sabancı's line built the London–Istanbul based Esas Holding into a multi-billion dollar investment firm. It manages capital allocation for real-estate, venture capital lead investments into technology sector companies, other diversified ventures, with the prominent example of such being the massive Turkish low-cost Pegasus Airlines.

== See also ==
- Hacı Ömer Sabancı Foundation
- Sabancı Holding
- Esas Holding
- Sabancı University
- Sakıp Sabancı Museum
