= Talas, Turkey =

District of Kayseri Province, Turkey

Talas
- District and municipality
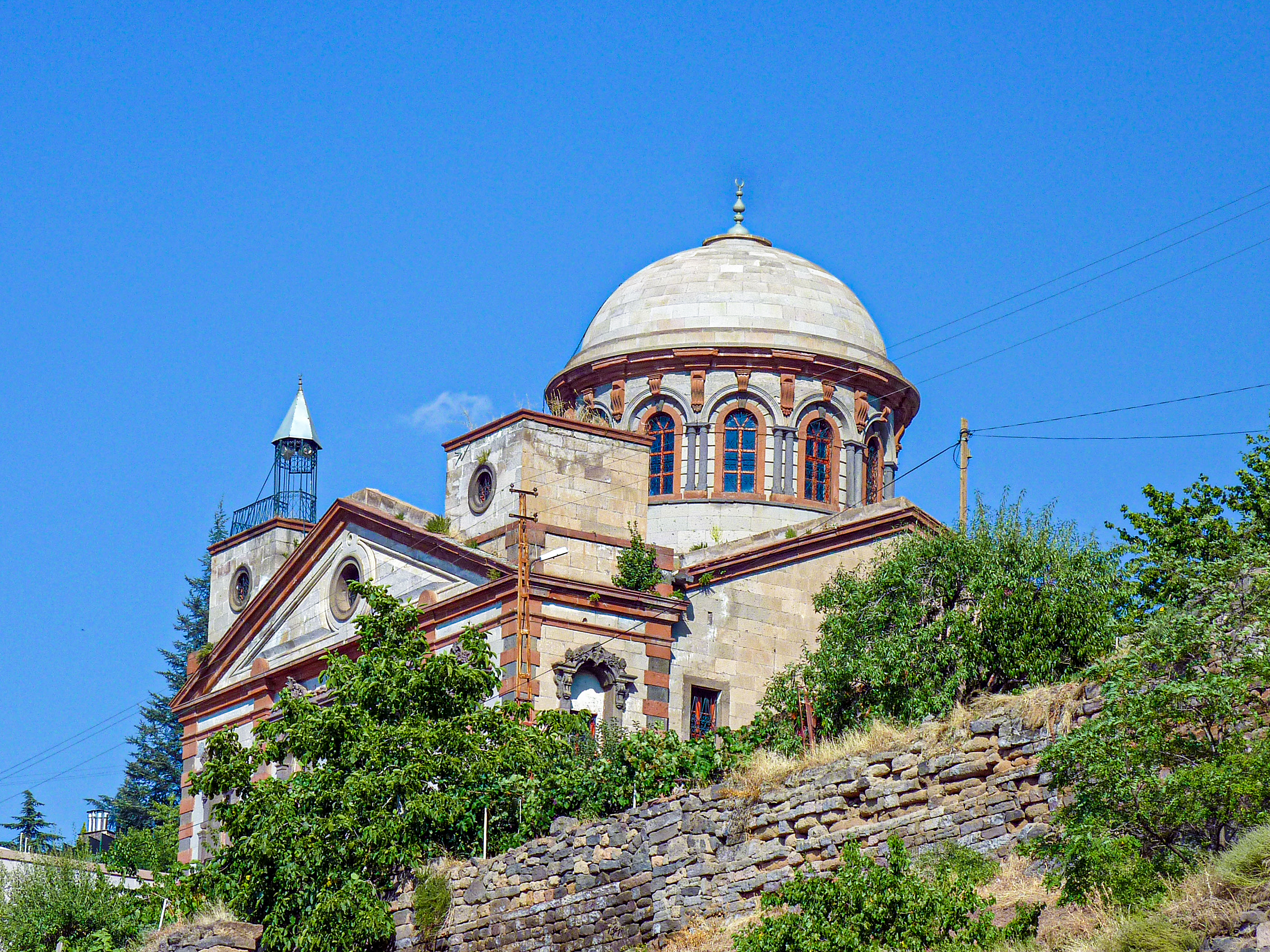
- Aya Panagia Greek Church in Talas, also known as the Yaman Dede Mosque

- Logo

- Map showing Talas District in Kayseri Province

- Location within Turkey Location within Turkey Central Anatolia
- Coordinates: 38°41′N 35°34′E
- Country: Turkey
- Province: Kayseri

Government
  - Mayor: Mustafa Yalçın (AKP)
- Area: 444 km^{2} (171 sq mi)
- Population (2022): 169,214
  - Density: 381/km^{2} (987/sq mi)
- Time zone: UTC+3 (TRT)
- Area code: 0352
- Website: www.talas.bel.tr

Talas is a municipality and district of Kayseri Province, Turkey. Its area is 444 km^{2}, and its population is 169,214 (2022). It is located about 7 km from the city of Kayseri and has evolved from an independent town to a satellite city of Kayseri. Talas is connected to Kayseri by road and by the Kayseray mass transit system.

== History ==
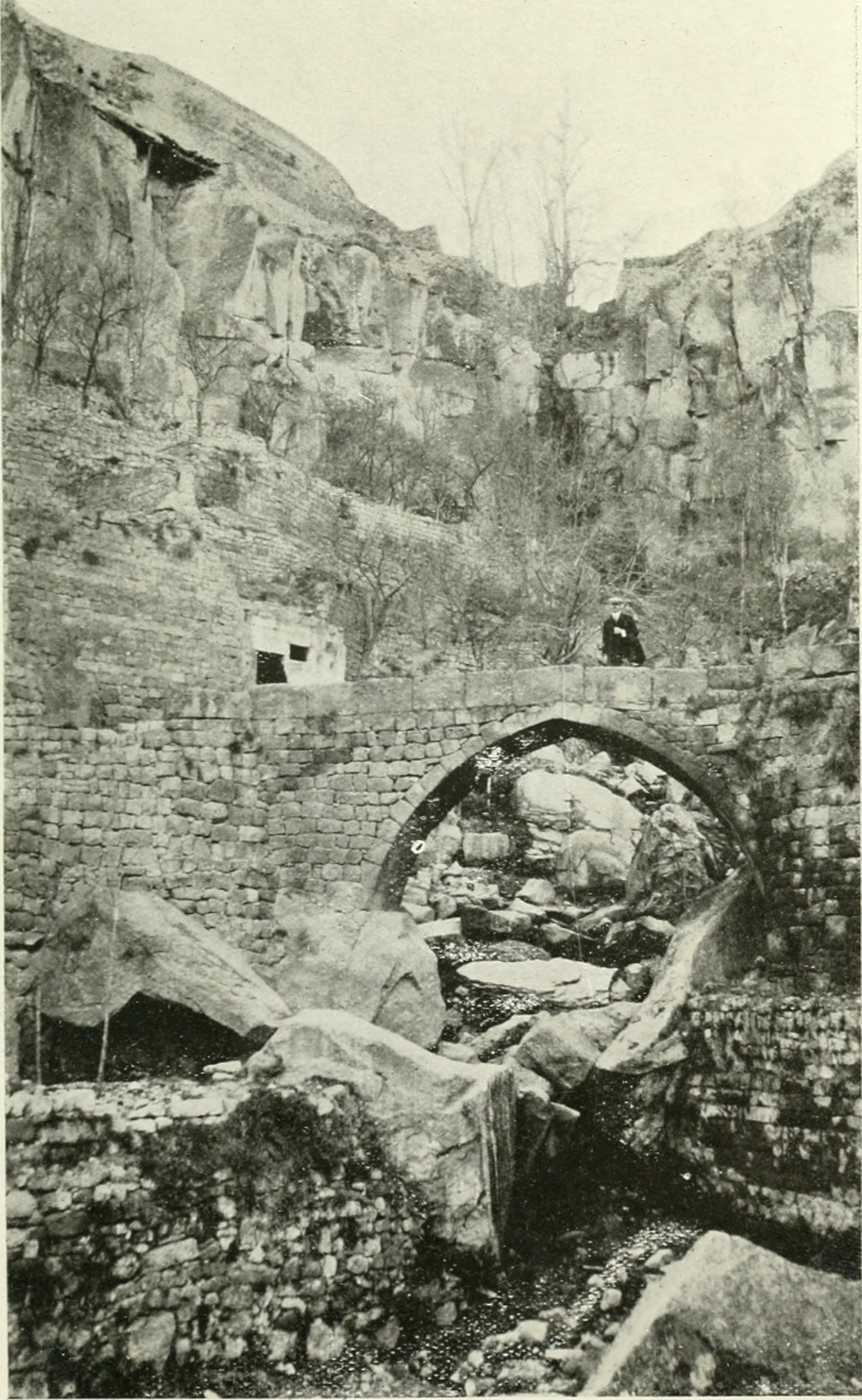
A Glen stone bridge in Talas, 1917

The history of Talas dates back to 1500 BC. Its name first appears in 1070 AD as Moutaláskê, when it was mentioned for the first time when referring to St. Sabas as Moutalaske. It is believed that in (1500 BC) the area was inhabited by Mazacs and later in (510 BC) Cappadocians, (312 BC) ruled by Cyrus the Great and the Achaemenid Empire, and later the Romans. Its name was later rendered as Dalassa (Greek: Δάλασσα).

=== Timeline ===
- 1071-1168 Danishmendids Administration
- 1077-1307 Seljuk Empire Administration
- "Mongol Invasion" in 1243
- 1312-1388 Ilkhanids Administration
- 1388-1446 Kadi Burhan al-Din Period
- 1446-1467 "Karamanids"
- 1467-1923 Ottomans (Al-i Osman, Al-i Dulkadiriye, Ramazanoğulları, Egyptian Mamluk Comrade (1835))
- 1923–Present Turkish Republic

In 1510, some of the Armenians, who were exposed to the pressure of the Safavid ruler Shah Ismail, settled around Talas. Talas later became one of the important Armenian settlements in Anatolia until its eventual destruction and evacuation in 1915 by members of the late Ottoman Empire. Following the establishment of Turkish Republic, Greeks in this region were deported to Greece by ships via Tarsus and Silifke during the Population exchange between Greece and Turkey. Today, there is a negligible presence of Armenian or Greek population in Talas.

=== Modern history ===
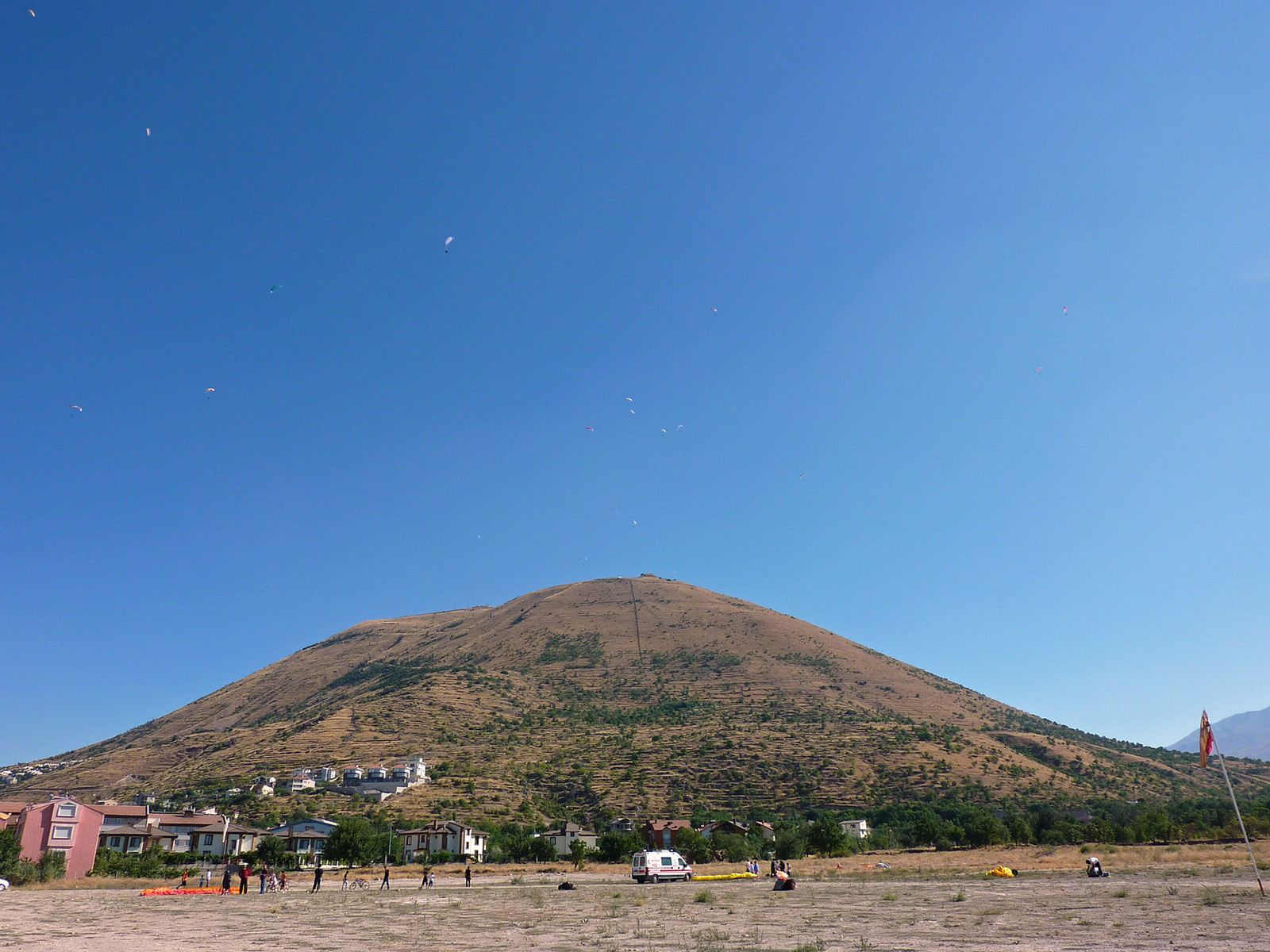
Ali Dağı in Talas, Kayseri.

Talas has grown rapidly since 1980 as a result of its proximity to neighboring Kayseri. Kayseri is considered to be one of the Anatolian Tigers which were one of a number of cities in Turkey which have displayed impressive growth records since the 1980s. While Talas was long an independent and adjacent town it has now physically connected into the larger Kayseri region and has several major road and one mass transit connection via Kayseray. A more traditional Anatolian village aesthetic of older single family homes and gardens dominates the southern portion of Talas while the northern section is predominantly high-rise housing - much of which was initially developed by TOKİ. In 2014, Talas was connected to Kayseri via the Kayseray light rail system.

== Geography ==
The district is located at the foot of Mount Erciyes, which is 7 km to southeast of Kayseri. The altitude of the district is 1100 meters above sea level. The southern portion of the district has a rugged geographical structure while the north is primarily a flat Anatolian plain.

There are no streams or lakes. Lower Talas is a valley with an average altitude of 1100 meters, and Upper Talas is a plateau with an altitude of 1191 meters. Ali Mountain is located at an altitude of 1870 meters in the southeast of the district. Mount Ali is a volcanic mountain formed as a result of the eruption of Mount Erciyes. Winters are cold and snowy while the summers are hot and dry. Rain usually falls in the spring and autumn seasons. There is no forest in the district, it is covered with meadows and pastures. There are plateaus in the villages of Cebir, Çömlekçi and Kepez in the district. The district's geographical features have become less predominant with its urbanization.

== Climate ==
=== Temperature ===
The temperature in Talas starts to rise from March. It reaches its highest values in July and August. During summer months, the temperatures routinely reach 39 to 40 °C. With the effect of the continental climate, the night temperature may drop to lows around 10 °C. From September onwards, the temperature decreases continuously. This decline continues until the end of February. The winter season is regarded as severely cold and dry. The average winter temperature is -1, -2 °C. Snowfall occurs between November and April.

=== Precipitation ===
Since the climate of the district has a continental climate, precipitation generally falls in the form of snow in winter and rain in spring. Since 2010, the annual precipitation average of 359.7mm per square meter. This is lower than the average for Turkey which is between 500mm and 600mm.

== Population ==
Historical population
Year	Pop.	±% p.a.
1990	49,025	—
1997	54,401	+1.50%
2007	75,675	+3.36%
2012	113,372	+8.42%
2017	155,024	+6.46%
2022	169,214	+1.77%
Source: 1990 census, 1997 census and TÜIK (2007-2022)

== Administrative structure ==
While it was a town connected to Kayseri Liva before 1907, the town organization was established in 1907 and it became a sub-district of Kayseri in 1911. In 1987, it became a district with the Law No. 3392. Talas was historically a summer resort due to its proximity to Kayseri and its high landforms, though this trend has changed with its urbanization and improvement of transportation connections to the region.

The Armenian population of the district hosted the Greek Army Commander-in-Chief Nikolaos Trikupis and his entourage, who were captured in the Turkish War of Independence. Before the mass deportation of Armenians from the area, Talas was known as an important trade center in Anatolia.

The mayor of Talas is Mustafa Yalçın. He is a member of the AKP.

=== Composition ===
There are 31 neighbourhoods in Talas District:

- Akçakaya
- Alaybeyli
- Ardıçköy
- Bahçelievler
- Başakpınar
- Çatakdere
- Cebir
- Çevlik
- Çömlekçi
- Cumhuriyet
- Endürlük
- Han
- Harman
- Kamber
- Kepez
- Kiçiköy
- Koçcağız
- Kuruköprü
- Mengücek
- Mevlana
- Örencik
- Reşadiye
- Sakaltutan
- Sosun
- Süleymanlı
- Tablakaya
- Yamaçlı
- Yazyurdu
- Yenidoğan
- Yukarı
- Zincidere

== Economy ==
There are small-scale furniture workshops and a textile factory built on ready-made clothing in the district. Erciyes University is located in Talas and employs a large population of professors and staff. As of 2019, the university had an undergraduate population of 56,103. With the extension of Kayseray to Talas, the city has evolved into a bedroom community to adjacent Kayseri which serves as the financial center of the larger region.

== Sister municipalities ==
Talas' sister municipalities include:

- (Bosnia and Herzegovina) Kalesija, Bosnia
- Hamborn, Germany
- Talas, Kyrgyzstan
- Beit Lahia, Palestine
- Elbistan, Turkey
- Onikişubat, Turkey
- Sarıkamış, Turkey
- Söğüt, Turkey
- Tavas, Turkey

== Notable people ==
- Mari Gerekmezyan was one of Turkey's first female sculptors and the first female Armenian sculptor.

== Gallery ==
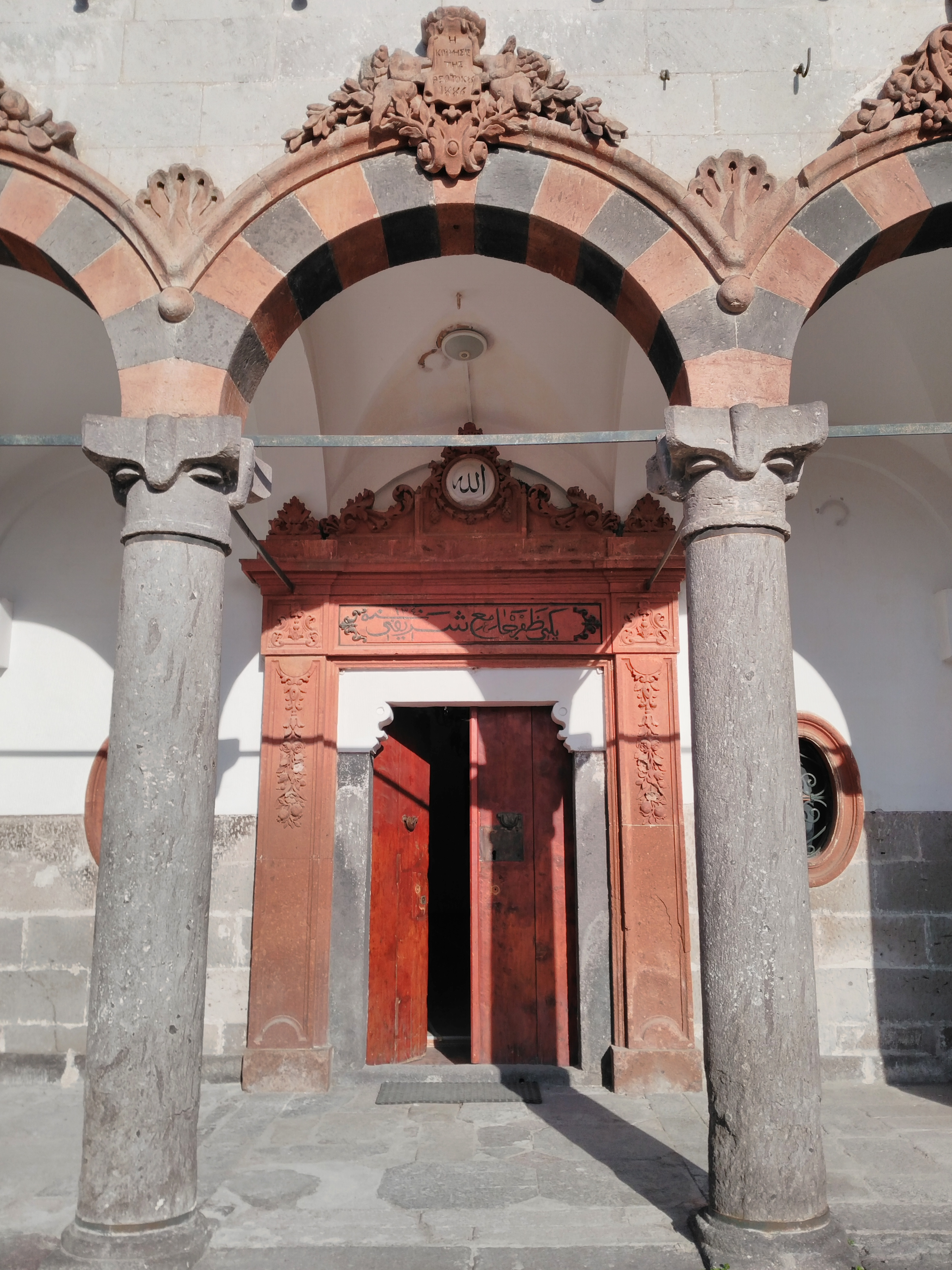
Exterior of the Yaman Dede Mosque

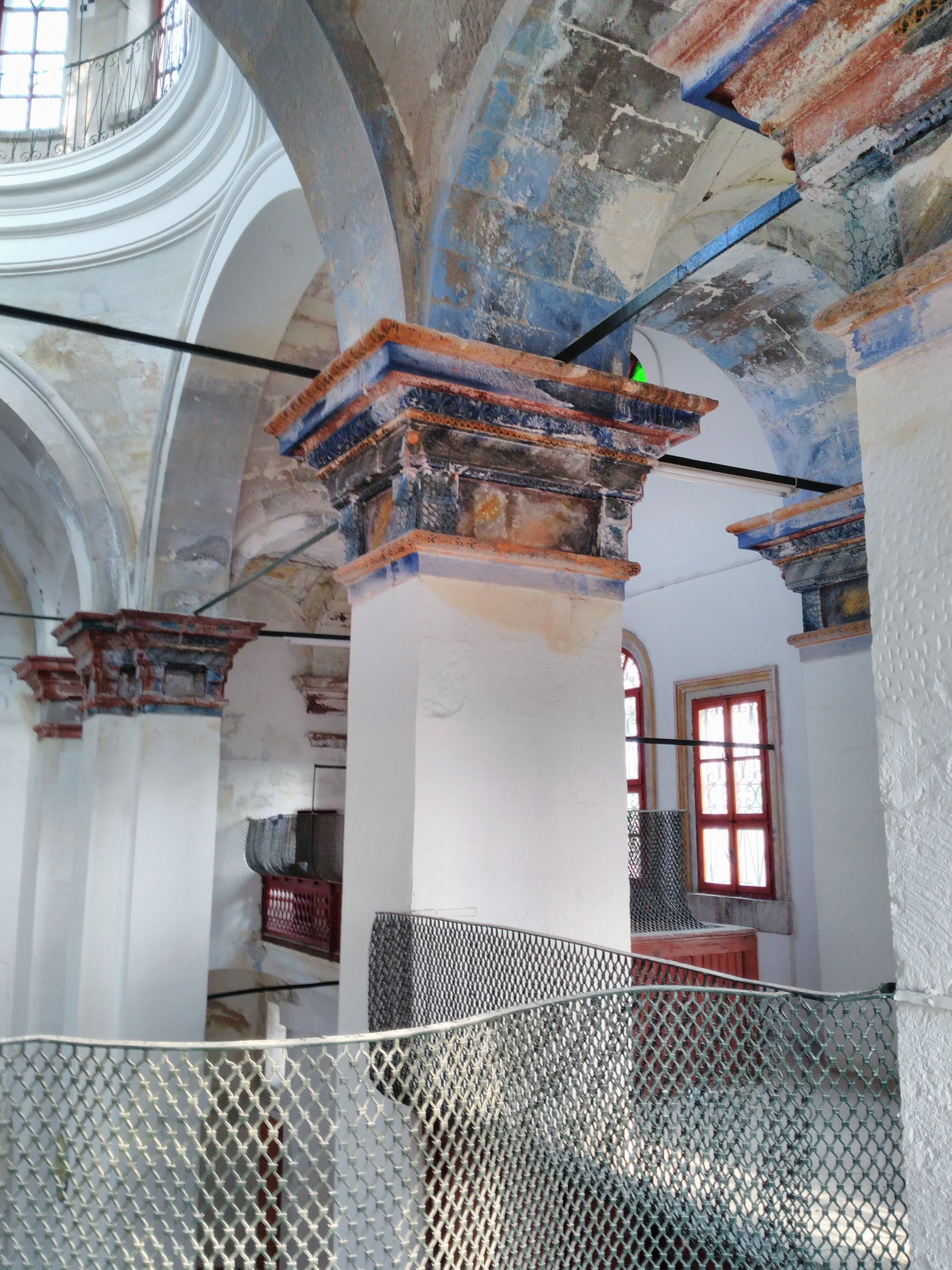
Interior of the Yaman Dede Mosque

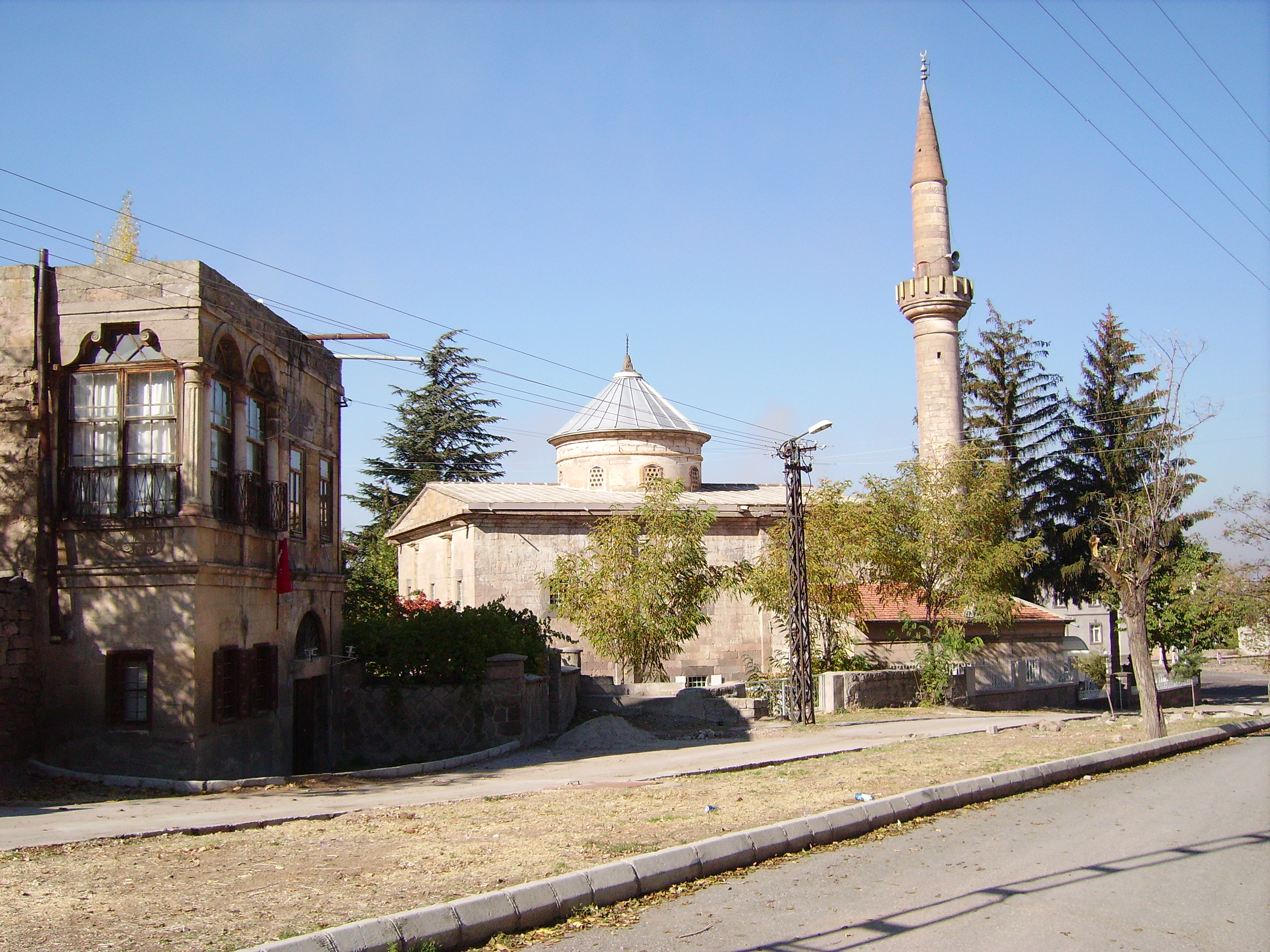
Historical building in Talas

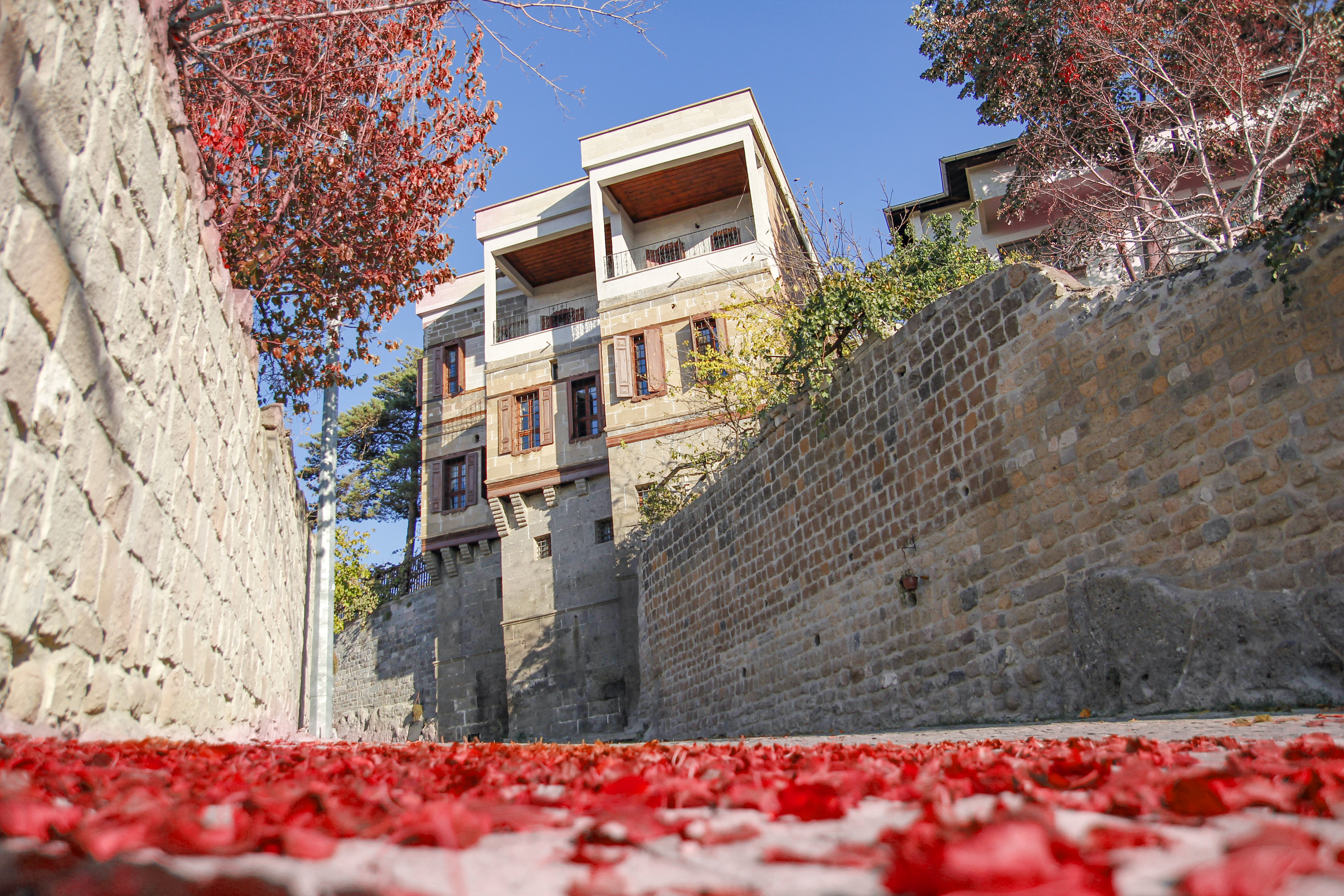
Yaman Dede Mansion

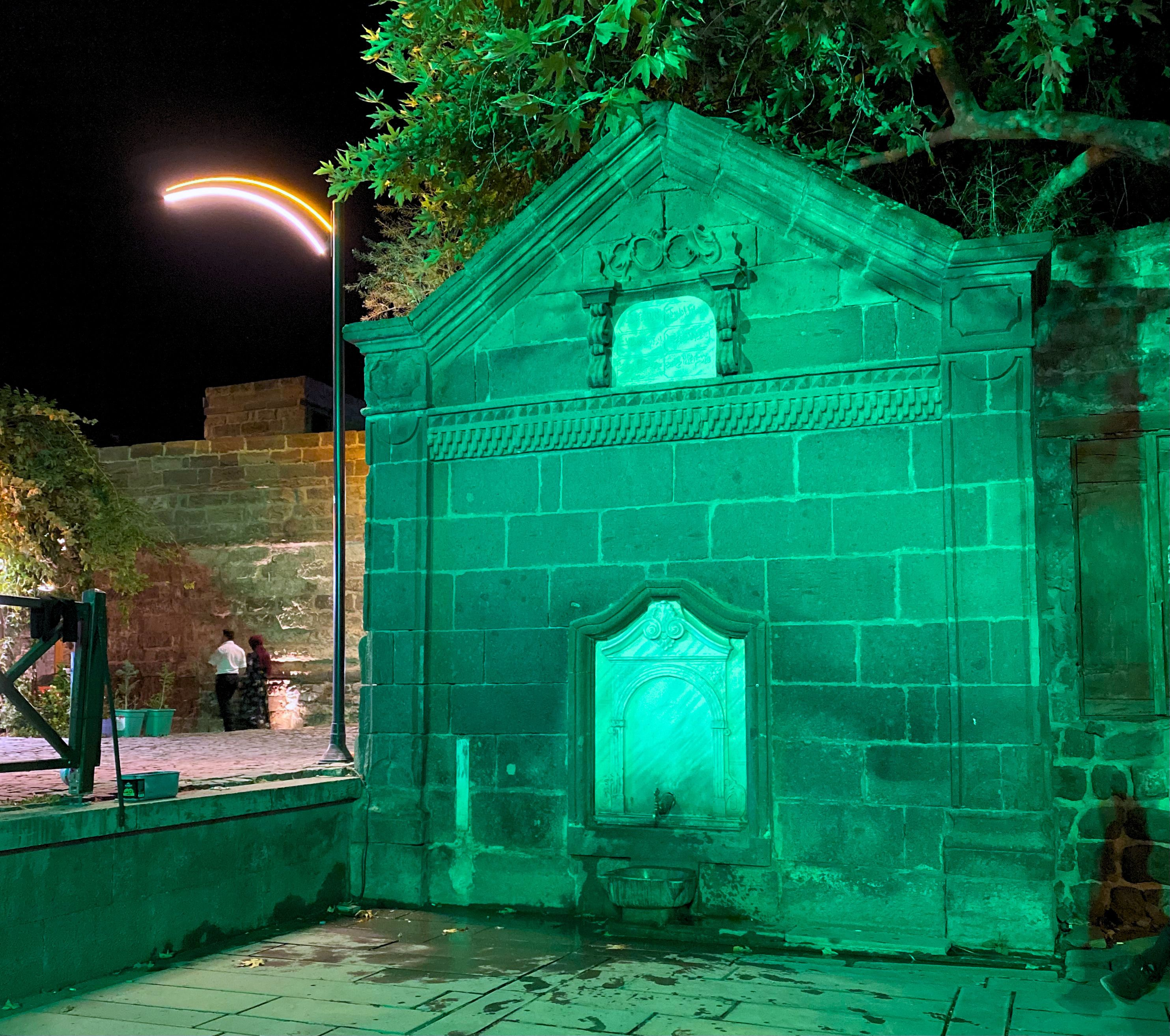
Ali Saip Paşa Square Fountain in Talas, built in 1887.

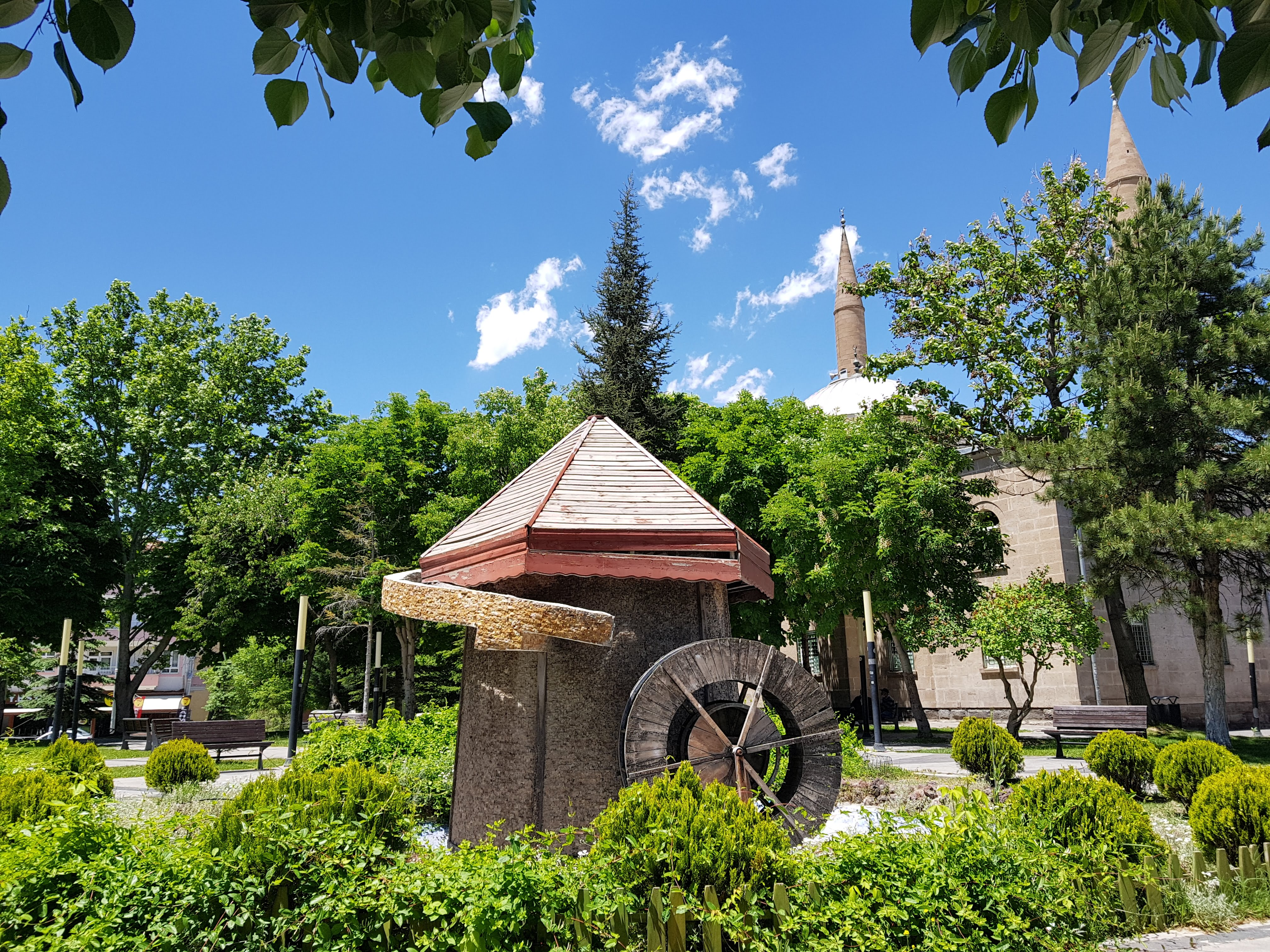
Talas Dedeoğlu Park

== See also ==
- Kayseri Province
- Talas American College
