= Sabancı Holding =

Turkish conglomerate

Sabancı Holding A.Ş.

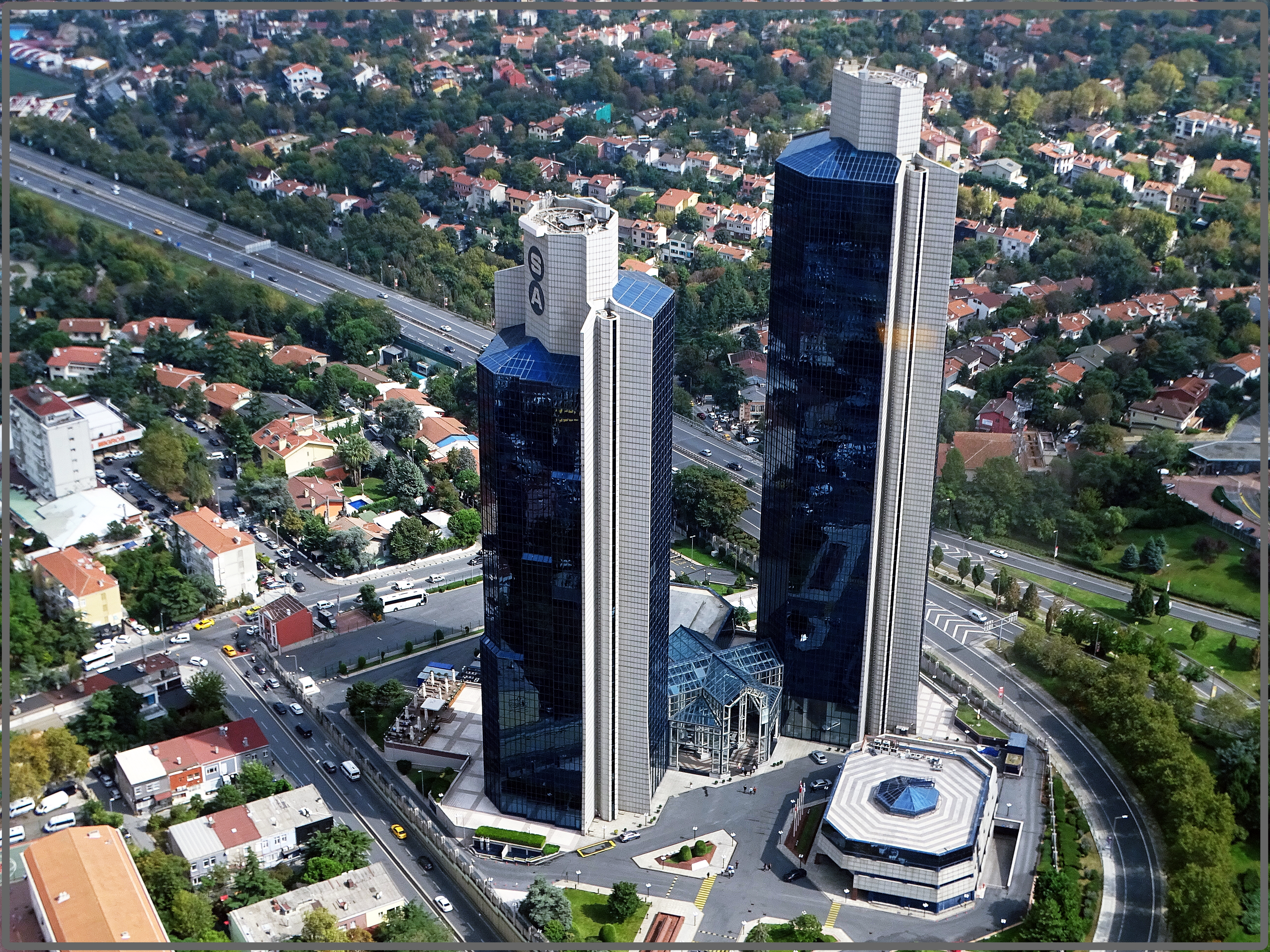
- Sabancı Center in Beşiktaş, İstanbul
- Type: Anonim Şirket
- Traded as: BİST: SAHOL
- Industry: Conglomerate
- Founded: 1967; 59 years ago
- Headquarters: Istanbul, Turkey
- Area served: Worldwide
- Key people: Hayri Çulhacı (Chair); Erol Sabancı (Vice Chair); Kıvanc Zaimler (CEO)
- Products: Finance, energy, cement, retail, insurance
- Revenue: ▲US$37.33 billion (2024)
- Operating income: ▼US$1.26 billion (2024)
- Net income: ▼US$0.12 billion (2024)
- Total assets: ▲US$87.26 billion (2024)
- Total equity: ▼US$13.43 billion (2024)
- Subsidiaries: List: Agesa Ak Yatırım Akçansa Akbank Aksigorta Ankara Enternasyonel Otelcilik Brisa Çimsa Enerjisa Enerjisa Üretim Kordsa Sabancı Building Solutions SabancıDX Sabancı İklim Teknolojileri Temsa Temsa Motorlu Araçlar Teknosa Tursa Exsa Gayrimenkul
- Website: www.sabanci.com

Hacı Ömer Sabancı Holding A.Ş., commonly abbreviated as Sabancı Holding, is an industrial and financial conglomerate with headquarters in Istanbul, Turkey. The company's primary activities are in financial services, energy (electricity generation and distribution), cement, retail and industrial sectors.

== Operations ==
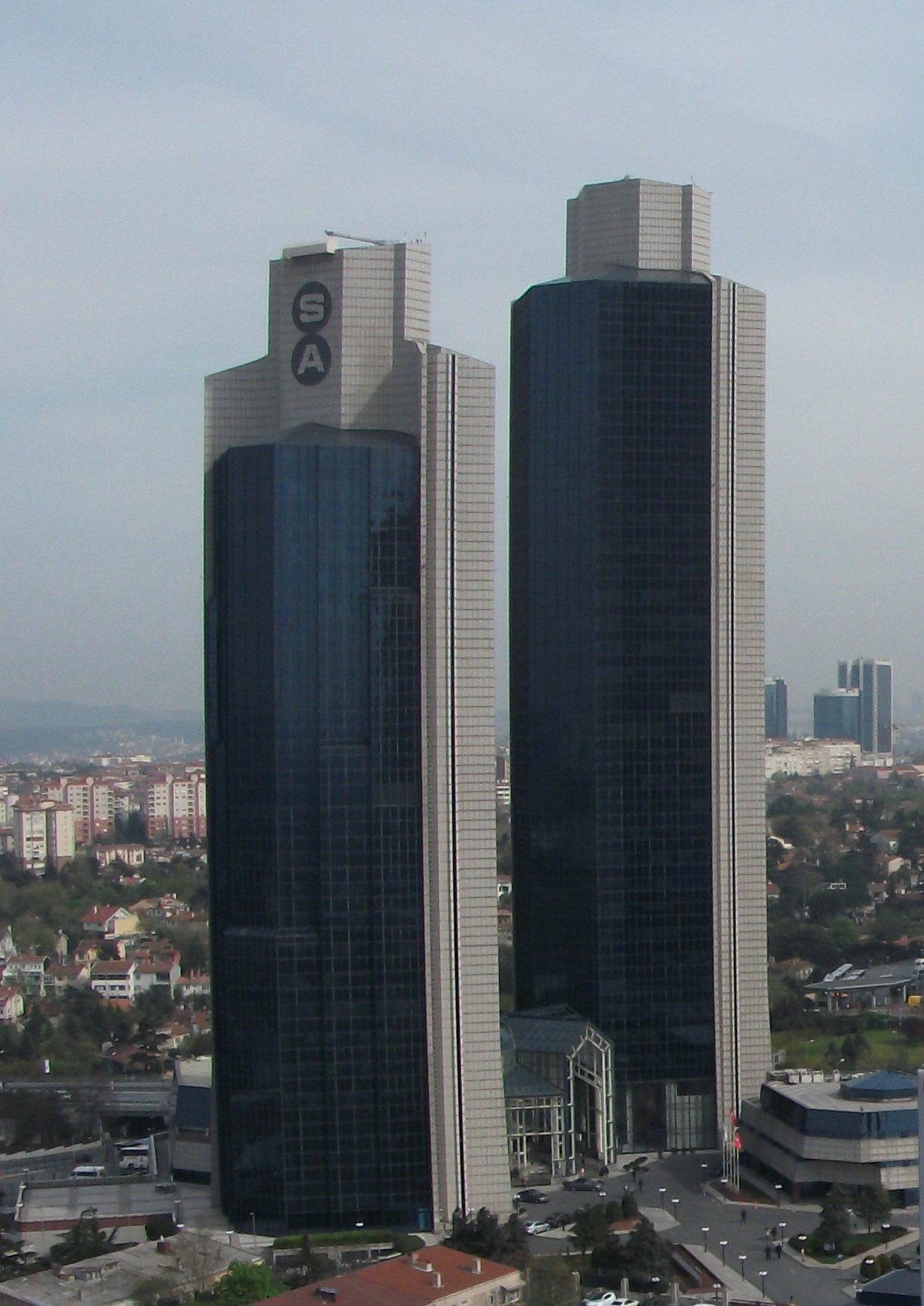
Sabancı Group Towers,holds ul, Turkey

Sabancı Group companies operate in 17 countries and market their products in EuropThe e East, Asia, North America and South America. The company operates through banking, industry, retail, cement and other segments, and offers corporate and investment, private, commercial, SME, retail, and international banking services, as well as payment systems, treasury transactions, insurance brokerage services, asset management services, and financial leasing services. Sabancı Holding's multinational business partners include global companies such as Ageas, Bridgestone, Carrefour, E.ON, HeidelbergCement, Marubeni and Komatsu.

In 2024, the Holding's combined sales reached ₺1.244 trillion (US$37.33 billion), while its combined EBITDA amounted to ₺128.9 billion (US$3.92 billion).

In March 2025, Hayri Çulhacı stepped into the role of the first non-family Chair and managing director of Sabancı Holding.

=== Industrials ===
- Kordsa
- Brisa (joint venture with Bridgestone)
- Temsa Motorlu Araçlar (joint venture with Komatsu)
- Temsa Ulaşım Araçları (joint venture with PPF Group)

=== Banking ===
- Akbank

=== Retail ===
- Teknosa (part of Euronics Network)

=== Financial Services ===
- Agesa (joint venture with Ageas)
- Aksigorta (joint venture with Ageas)

=== Energy ===
- Enerjisa (joint venture with E.ON)
- Enerjisa Üretim (joint venture with E.ON): Owns the lignite-fired Tufanbeyli power station. Enerjisa is on the Global Coal Exit List compiled by the NGO Urgewald.
- Sabancı Climate Technologies

=== Building Materials ===
- Çimsa
- Akçansa (joint venture with HeidelbergCement)
- Sabancı Building Solutions

=== Digital ===
- SabancıDX

=== Others ===
- Tursa: owns and operates 3 Hilton branded hotels in Adana, Ankara and Mersin
- Exsa
- Ankara Enternasyonel Otelcilik

== Headquarters ==
Sabancı Holding relocated its headquarters from Adana to Istanbul in 1974, in the Sabancı Group towers, a twin skyscraper complex in Levent.
