= International Sabancı Theater Festival =

Annual theater festival in Adana, Turkey

State Theater-Sabancı International Adana Theater Festival Devlet Tiyatroları Sabancı Uluslararası Tiyatro Festivali
- Genre: Theatre
- Begins: March 27
- Ends: April 30
- Frequency: Annual
- Locations: Adana, Turkey
- Inaugurated: 1999
- Patrons: Turkish State Theatres; Ministry of Tourism and Culture; Sabancı Foundation
- Website: www.sabancivakfi.org/sayfa/tiyatro-festivali

International Sabancı Theater Festival or International Adana Theater Festival, more precisely State Theater-Sabancı International Adana Theater Festival, (Turkish: Devlet Tiyatroları Sabancı Uluslararası Tiyatro Festivali) is a theatre festival held every year in Adana since 1999. It is a joint organization of Turkish State Theatres, the Ministry of Tourism and Culture and the Sabancı Foundation. Many national and international theater groups perform their plays during the festival.

Featuring as an annual international festival lasting a month, the festival entertains almost 20,000 devotees of drama, who are eager to see the plays performed during the festival.

The festival plays were only staged in Adana until 2005 and since then some of the plays are also staged at Sabancı University's Performing Arts Center in Istanbul. The "Sakıp Sabancı Lifetime Achievement Award" is presented on the opening day of the festival since 2005 to honor and recognize the role of the masters, who had profound contributions to the evolution of the drama as an art.

== Festival in 2011 ==
The 13th edition of the festival kicked off on March 27, the World Theatre Day, with an astounding opening show staged by Italian ensemble Studio Festi on the Seyhan River and the Taşköprü (literally 'Stone Bridge'). "Water Symphony" show was welcomed by thousands of people with great enthusiasm.

The opening ceremony of the festival was held at the Adana HiltonSA hotel with the attendance of many distinguished guests. Chairman of the Sabancı Foundation Board of Trustees, Güler Sabancı, noted in her speech that as people of Anatolia, a cradle of several cultures, they bore significant responsibility for the dissemination of culture and arts around Turkey. Sabancı underscored the Foundation's efforts to increase the number of art viewers in Turkey and to ensure future generations to embrace the cultural legacy. She also remarked that the Foundation was content to contribute to the promotion of the cultural wealth of Anatolia to the rest of the world. Asserting that the Festival integrates more with the city of Adana each year, Sabancı added,

"Today our city Adana is taking firm steps to transform to an international center for arts and culture. We feel proud to open a window to the world through the bountiful land of Adana thanks to the State Theater-Sabancı International Adana Theater Festival."

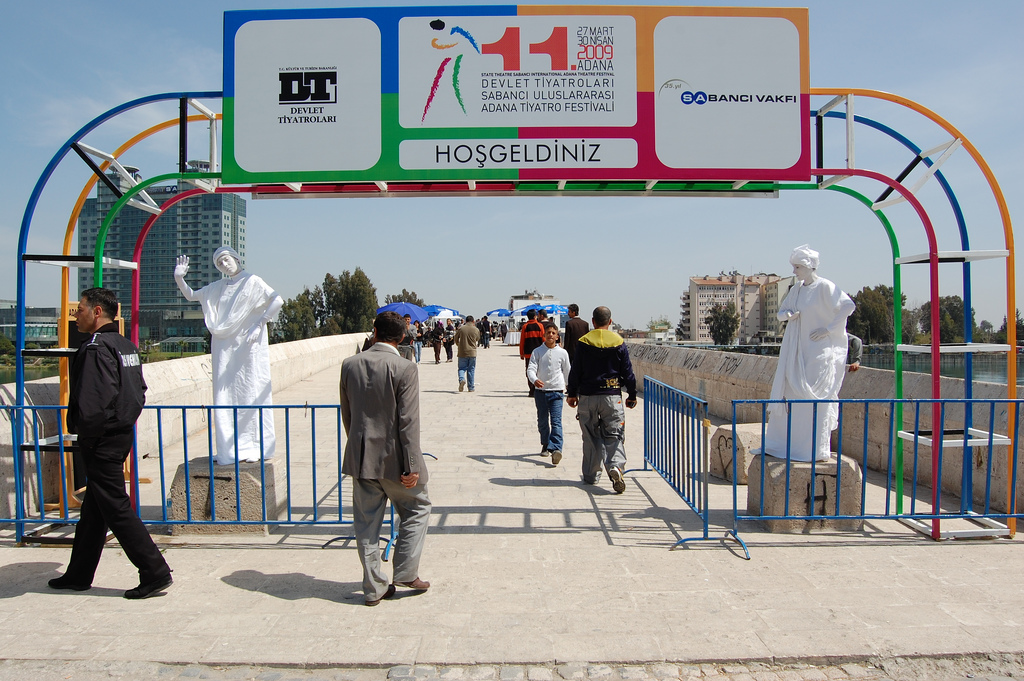
Taşköprü hosting Sabancı Theater Festival opening ceremony

General Manager of State Theaters, Lemi Bilgin, who took the floor at the ceremony said,

"We feel proud to organize the 13th Adana Theater Festival this year, an event that elevates human values by way of arts. The Festival, which commenced on March 27, the World Theatre Day, represents the first loop of the State Theater festival chain. We are very happy to present the ensembles from various countries who exhibit the most exquisite examples of their cultures here. As life flows at dizzying speed, such festivals add meaning to our lives. We want to take this opportunity to thank art lovers of Adana for cherishing and embracing arts."

Minister of Culture and Tourism, Ertuğrul Günay, expressed the success of international festivals organized in various provinces of Turkey.

"I would like to thank Sabancı Family and Sabancı Foundation for their ongoing support for State Theaters-Sabancı International Adana Theater Festival, and to everyone else, who have enabled the staging of various local and foreign works of theater to meet the audiences."

“Sakıp Sabancı Lifetime Achievement Award” is awarded to Gülriz Sururi in 2011. Among works performed during the festival are Chinghiz Aitmatov’s unforgettable My Poplar in a Red Scarf by the Gabit Musirepov Kazakhstan State Theater Child and Youth; Electra by the National Theatre Radu Stanca Sibiu from Romania; Enigma Variations by the Vakhtangov Theater from Russia; The Crime of Cura Tato by the Plankton Theater Collective from Chile, Anna Karenina by the Anzelika Cholina Dance Theater from Lithuania and Malaya by the Close Act Theater from the Netherlands. Other performances at the festival include The Diary of a Mad Man, Karbala and Eleven Snapshots from Nazim Hikmet's Human Landscapes from My Country by the Ankara State Theatre; Bury the Dead by the Istanbul State Theatre; House of Leyla by Theatre Kare; Flame Days by Istanbul Public Theater; Woman and Officer by Beşiktaş Culture Center; Uncle Vanya by Theatre Studio; Dress Rehearsal for a Suicide by the Istanbul Municipal Theater and Azizlikler (Where are we going?) by Dostlar Theatre.

461 artists from 17 ensembles (10 local and 7 foreign) performed outdoor shows as well as street shows during the opening and closing of the festival, whereas the remainder of the plays took stage at Sabancı Cultural Center again this year.

== Festival in 2010 ==
The 12th Theater Festival began on March 27, again on the World Theatre Day, with a spectacular show by the Italian Studio Festi ensemble. Studio Festi is known across the world with their fascinating visual performances and dramatic creations orchestrated in city centers, natural surroundings and historical sites, and their show for the Festival opening viewed by thousands of people with great interest. The one-hour "Concert for Elements" performed on the Seyhan River featured Studio Festi dancers defying gravity atop huge planets and model ships rising to the sky. Dancing with fire, water sphere choreographies and the fireworks show were among other captivating spectacles performed by the group. The festival reaches more than 20 thousand spectators every year, and features 21 performances by 12 foreign and 6 Turkish ensembles this year. In addition, 5 ensembles performed their plays at the Sabanci University Performing Arts Center, bringing the festival spirit to Istanbul.

General Manager of State Theaters Lemi Bilgin said,

“We are proud to have the 12th Theater Festival in Adana. Starting on the World Theatre Day, this festival is first in a series of festivals by the State Theaters. We are as excited as we had been a decade ago. We are delighted to be depicting the sacred face of drama. We are happy to blend peoples and traditions of various countries. Finally, we are blissful that art is making its mark on the fertile lands of Adana. We would like to thank the people of Adana for supporting drama and their festival.”

Chairman of the Sabancı Foundation Board of Trustees Güler Sabancı noted their pleasure in helping thousands of people enjoy drama through the festival, which she said was supported by the foundation to help spread the outreach of social, cultural and artistic events in Turkey and uphold traditional values. Sabancı added that the festival breathed new life into the artistic and cultural facet of Adana, and said,

"I am proud that what began as a local event is now an international festival. This is an important step in making Adana a center for culture and the arts,"

and continued,

"Taşköprü is a part of the festival again. The festival is now a part of the way the people of Adana live."

Minister of Culture and Tourism Erturul Günay expressed his pride in the success of international festivals held in various cities of Turkey. The master of ceremonies for the night was actor Ali Düşenkalkar, and the "World Theatre Day Declaration" was read by Derya Keyf. In 2010, Sakıp Sabancı Lifelong Achievement Award was given to Müşfik Kenter. Speaking at the ceremony, Müşfik Kenter said,

"I am honored and proud. Speaking onstage is something; speaking at this ceremony is something altogether different."

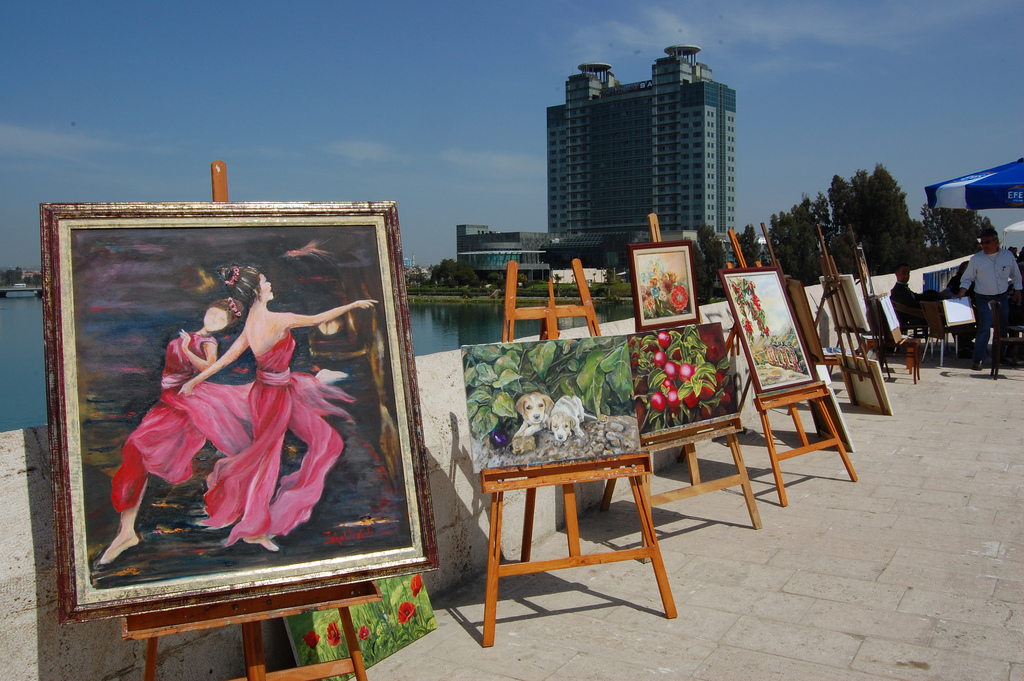
Art Exhibition at Taşköprü during the Sabancı Theatre Festival

The festival concluded with carnival in the streets: The French Transe-Express Theater, performing for the first time in Turkey, began its street spectacle "Freedom of Violins" at the Atatürk Park, and ended at the railway station, offering an unforgettable experience to spectators. The rhythmic cortege accompanied by vocalists melted into the crowd, playing electronic music like a medieval techno parade. Suspended by an outsized pendulum, two acrobats alternately beat the hide of a vast drum, while violinists suspended 100 feet in the air caused suspense to linger in the air.

The festival hosted eleven foreign groups from nine countries in addition to three state theater ensembles, three private theaters and one municipal theater, who performed 21 plays in total. Foreign participants of the festival were; Théatre de la Huchette and Trans-Express Street Theater from France, Theater Freiburg from Germany, Markus Zohner Theater from Switzerland, Pappa Tarahumara Theater from Japan, La Luna and Unforgettable Women Theaters from Cuba; Tuva State Music and Drama Theater from Tuva, Nicosia Municipal Theater from Northern Cyprus; Tatiana Garrido Flamenco Ensemble from Spain and Studio Festi from Italy. Domestic performers were the Kenter Theater, Dostlar Theater, AYSA Production Theater, Istanbul Metropolitan Municipality Theater, Ankara State Theater, Istanbul State Theater and Konya State Theater.

Stage plays were performed at the Sabancı Cultural Center, while outdoor performances appealed to a greater number of viewers: In addition to the opening performance of the Italian Studio Festi ensemble on the Taşköprü, the Spanish flamenco group performed their "Fuego y Arena" show at the Merkez Park, and the closing performance by the French ensemble Transe Express was staged at the Atatürk Park and the railway station. Taşköprü hosted other events during the festival. In addition, two foreign and three domestic ensembles staged their plays at the Sabanci University Performing Arts Center in Istanbul, drawing audiences from Istanbul into the festival spirit.

== Festival in 2009 ==
11th Sabancı Theater Festival was held on March 27 to April 30, 2009. The Opening Ceremony of the festival was held on the first day, which corresponded to the World Theatre Day. World-famous Spanish group "Comediants" performed their play Dimonis, which included fire dances, dragons and fireworks, and turned the opening into an extraordinarily fascinating show. The theme of the event was "Moving the Theater Festival to the streets".

The opening ceremony of the festival was held in Hilton Hotel with the attendance of Güler Sabancı, Sabancı Foundation President of the Board of Trustees, Dilek Sabancı, Sabancı Foundation Member of the Board of Trustees, Lemi Bilgin, Director of the State Theaters and İlhan Atış

Governor of Adana Province. In her opening speech, Güler Sabancı said:

"Since the beginning of the festival, each year we are trying to improve it. This is what late Sakıp Sabancı would have wanted from us. We achieved this success with the support of Ertuğrul Günay, Minister of Tourism and Culture. Last year, the tickets were sold out in an hour. We will always get better with the support of Adana residents."

Referring to the theme of the festival this year which is "Moving the Theater Festival to the streets" Güler Sabancı said: “With the improvements this year, I am proud to announce that the festival has come to a new level."

Throughout the festival of 2009, an audience of twenty thousand people watched 17 theater groups performing 19 plays. In addition, six groups performed their plays at Sabancı University Performing Arts Center in Istanbul.

The festival ended on April 30 with a street show called "Bivouac" performed by a French band called "Generik Vapeur". The closing show started when members of Generik Vapeur started to suspend themselves from ropes down high up in the second story of the railway station in Adana. Having painted their faces, arms and legs blue, the performers then started to march onwards to Atatürk Street in accompaniment of barrels carried or rolled by them and under fireworks. Many citizens marched along with the band during the performance, applauding them. The band members then arrived at Atatürk Park. The performance finished when the band members overturned some stacked barrels.

=== Sakıp Sabancı Lifetime Achievement Award ===
In 2009, Genco Erkal received "Sakip Sabanci Lifetime Achievement Award" during the opening ceremony. Erkal, who received his award from Güler Sabancı, said during his speech that he has made it a habit to come to Adana at least once every year throughout his 50-year career to present one of his productions. He said: "I have always admired the maturity, perceptiveness and the high quality of theatergoers in Adana." Recalling his company's performance at the opening of the inaugural festival ten years ago, Erkal said:

"We opened the first festival with Nazım Hikmet’s My People. The late Sakıp Sabancı, after watching the play from the front row, congratulated me with a hug in his unique enthusiasm. I am proud to be receiving this valuable award that was named after him, honoring the 50 years I have left behind."
