= Sevil Sabancı =

Turkish businesswoman (born 1973)

Sevil Sabancı (born January 4, 1973) is a Turkish businesswoman and a member of the Sabancı family in third generation.

== Biography ==
She was born on January 4, 1973, in Istanbul, Turkey as the third child of Sakıp Sabancı, the founder of Sabancı Holding, Turkey’s second biggest industrial and financial conglomerate. Sevil received a degree in Business Administration from Marmara University in Istanbul.

Following her graduation, she worked at various posts in family-owned companies, and then entered the board of directors of Sabancı Holding in 1997, serving until 2001. She is member of the board of Türkan Sabancı School for Sight Disabled, which was established by her mother, Türkan Sabancı.

Inspired by the equestrian statue in the garden of her family’s former mansion Atlı Köşk ("The Equestrian Villa") in Emirgan, Istanbul, Sevil Sabancı is a passionate jumping rider competing internationally. In 2006, she finished first at Wiesbaden Small Tour at 1.20 and won also the final competition in Leipzig, Germany. She is vice president of the Turkish Equestrian Federation.

She has a daughter, Melisa Sabancı Tapan, from her first marriage with Eran Tapan. Sevil Sabanci Sabanci is on the board of Haci Ömer Sabanci Holding AS, Sabanci Universitesi and Sakip Sabanci Müzesi and Member of Turkish Industry & Business Association.
