= Sabancı Performing Arts Center =

- Sabancı Universitesi Gösteri Merkezi
- Location of Sabancı Performing Arts Center in Turkey
- Address: Orhanlı, Orta Mah. Üniversite Cad. 27; Tuzla, Istanbul, Istanbul; Turkey
- Coordinates: 40.89250°N 29.37500°E
- Owner: Sabancı University
- Capacity: 912

Construction
- Opened: April 2005; 21 years ago

Website
- www.sabanciuniv.edu/en/campus-life/sgm

Sabancı Performing Arts Center (Turkish: Sabancı Üniversitesi Gösteri Merkezi) is the performing arts center and conference hall of Sabancı University in Tuzla district of Istanbul, Turkey.

The late Sakıp Sabancı, Honorary Chairman of the Trustees of Sabancı University, had announced the opening of the Sabancı University Performing Arts Center, of which the official inauguration took place on Sunday, 6 June 2005, with a personally written letter of invitation, three days before he died. The center began offering its performance series in April 2005.

Sabancı University Performing Arts Center aims to contribute to the rich cultural life of Istanbul, particularly to the city's Anatolian coast, and provide cultural and artistic services to the university's students and staff, as well as to all art appreciators in the region.

The center's goal is to organize activities through which art appreciators of all ages and walks of life can interact with the arts, as well as to become a prestigious performing arts center renowned for the quality of its performing national and international artists and groups. The auditorium has a seating capacity of 912.
