= Dilek Sabancı =

Turkish travel company founder (born 1964)

Personal details
- Born: 24 August 1964 (age 62) Adana, Turkey
- Occupation: Entrepreneur, businesswoman
- Net worth: ▲£1 billion (US$1.66 billion)

Dilek Sabancı (born 1964) is the Turkish chairperson and CEO of Vista Tourism and Travel, a firm she founded in 1989. She is an heir to the Sabancı family fortune, as a daughter of Sakıp Sabancı.

== Life and career ==
Dilek has bachelor's degrees from Reinhardt University and Fisher College. Dilek established Vista Tourism and Travel with her father in 1989 and has evolved the company to one of the largest travel agencies in Turkey. She is a board member of the family’s Hacı Ömer Sabancı Foundation, a philanthropic organisation involved in education and health.

Dilek is disabled and devotes much of her time to helping mentally and physically impaired people. Sabancı is also active in a number of charitable groups as the vice president of Turkish Sports Federation for the Mentally Handicapped, chair of board of directors of Turkish Special Olympics, and an active member in Foundation for Children with Leukemia and Kanlica Lions and Rotary Clubs.

Supporting various social, cultural and sports activities every year, Sabancı has funded several facilities, including “Dilek Sabancı Anatolian Vocational Trade School”, “Beşiktaş Municipality Dilek Sabancı Park”, “Dilek Sabancı Antalya Sports Hall”, “Dilek Sabancı Gülen Yüzler Vocational Rehabilitation and Business Centre”, “Konya Selçuk University Dilek Sabancı Conservatory” as well as “Dilek Sabancı Art Gallery” in Mardin.
