= Sakıp Sabancı =

Turkish businessman (1933–2004)

- Born: 7 April 1933; Akçakaya Village, Kayseri
- Died: 10 April 2004 (aged 71); Istanbul
- Resting place: Zincirlikuyu Cemetery, Istanbul
- Organization: Sabancı Holding
- Notable work: Hacı Ömer Sabancı Foundation, Sabancı Holding, Sabancı University, and Sakıp Sabancı Museum
- Spouse: Türkan (Civelek) Sabancı
- Children: 3, including Sevil Sabancı, Dilek Sabanci
- Parent(s): Hacı Ömer Sabancı; Sadıka Sabancı

Sakıp Sabancı (7 April 1933 – 10 April 2004) was a Turkish business tycoon and philanthropist.

== Biography ==
He was the second son of a cotton trader and worked in his father's business without completing high school. He was the head of Turkey's largest business conglomerate and 147th richest man on the Forbes list of billionaires in 2004.

In the 1980s, he took over the family business with assistance from his brothers.

The Sabancı Group of Companies operates in eighteen countries and markets its products internationally. Currently, Sabancı Holding controls more than 60 companies, in textiles, tourism, automotives, chemicals, tobacco, cement, insurance and banking. The group also has partnerships with the Hilton Group, Bridgestone, Du Pont, Philip Morris, Bekaert, Heidelberg Cement, IBM, BNP Paribas, Dresdner Bank, Carrefour and International Paper. Sabancı Holding and ten other companies within the group are listed on the Istanbul Stock Exchange. In 2011, the consolidated revenue of the company was $13.4 billion. The Sabancı family holds a 60.6% share of the firm.

Sakip Sabanci founded the Sabancı University in 1999. His collections of more than 320 Ottoman and Turkish paintings, statues and more than 400 examples of Ottoman calligraphy are exhibited at Atlı Köşk (English: The Equestrian Villa) at Bosporus in Emirgan, Istanbul, where he and his family lived for years, and which was converted into the Sakıp Sabancı Museum in 2002.

He died of kidney cancer at the age of 71 and received a state funeral.

In 2016, Columbia University established the Sakıp Sabancı Chair and Center for Turkish Studies, the first initiative of its kind in the United States. This initiative, supported by a $10 million donation, aims to enhance knowledge and awareness of Turkey through research, teaching, and intellectual exchange. The establishment of the professorship and the center is part of a broader effort to foster academic collaboration and promote Turkish studies globally. Additionally, the gift will contribute to research and academic partnerships at Sabancı University in Istanbul.

== Honorary doctorates ==
Sabancı received honorary doctorates from the following Turkish and American universities:

- Kırıkkale University, Kırıkkale (2002)
- Çukurova University, Adana (1999)
- Southeastern University, Washington D.C. (1998)
- Istanbul University, Istanbul (1997)
- Mimar Sinan Fine Arts University, Istanbul (1997)
- Girne American University, Kyrenia, Cyprus (1997)
- Çanakkale Onsekiz Mart University, Çanakkale (1997)
- Trakya University, Edirne (1997)
- Erciyes University, Kayseri (1993)
- Yıldız Technical University, Istanbul (1992)
- Anadolu University, Eskişehir (1984)
- University of New Hampshire, New Hampshire (1986)

== Awards ==
He was awarded by various national and international institutions as listed below:

- France: National Order of the Legion of Honour by French President Jacques Chirac (2001)
- Turkey: State Medal of Distinguished Service by President Süleyman Demirel (1997)
- Japan: Order of the Sacred Treasure, Golden and Silver Star (1992)
- Belgium: Order of Leopold II by Prince Albert (later King Albert II of Belgium) (1987)
- Gebze Institute of Technology: Industry Technology and Quality Award (2001)
- Turkish Ministry of Culture and Tourism: Grand Prize of Culture and Arts (1999)
- Friends of American Board Schools in Turkey in New York City: Businessman of the Year Award (1999)
- European Institute for Economy in Zurich: European Chrystal World Award (1997)
- Gold Mercury International Award (1979)

== Books ==
He wrote books mostly on his experience in business life. Some of them are translated into English and Japanese. The royalties from his books are being donated to Darülaceze and Türkiye Spastik Çocuklar Vakfı (English: Turkey Foundation for Spastic Children).

1. İşte Hayatım (English: This is my life), 1985
2. Para Başarının Mükafatıdır (English: Money is the Reward of Success), 1985
3. This is my life (English Edition), 1988
4. Gönül Galerimden (English: From the Galleria of My Heart), 1988
5. Rusya'dan Amerika'ya (English: From Russia to America), 1989
6. Ücret Pazarlığı mı? - Koyun Pazarlığı mı? (English: Is it wage bargain or sheep bargain?), 1990
7. Değişen ve Gelişen Türkiye (English: Turkey, Changing and Developing), 1991
8. Daha Fazla İş Daha Fazla Aş (English: More Work, More Food), 1993
9. Doğu Anadolu Raporu (English: Eastern Anatolian Report), 1995
10. Başarı Şimdi Aslanın Ağzında (English: Success is Now in the Lion's Mouth), 1998
11. İşte Hayatım (Japanese Edition), 2000
12. Hayat Bazen Tatlıdır (English: Life is Sometimes Sweet), 2001
13. Sakıpname (English: Dedicated to Sakıp), 2002
14. Bıraktığım Yerden Hayatım (English: My Life from where I Left Off), 2004
15. Her Şeyin Başı Sağlık (English: Health First), 2004

== See also ==
- List of billionaires
- Adile Sultan Palace
- The Sabancı Group In Brief
- Official Website (English)
- Encyclopædia Britannica, Sakıp Sabancı
