= Changa (restaurant) =

Restaurant in Istanbul, Turkey

Coordinates: 41°02′09″N 28°59′05.3″E

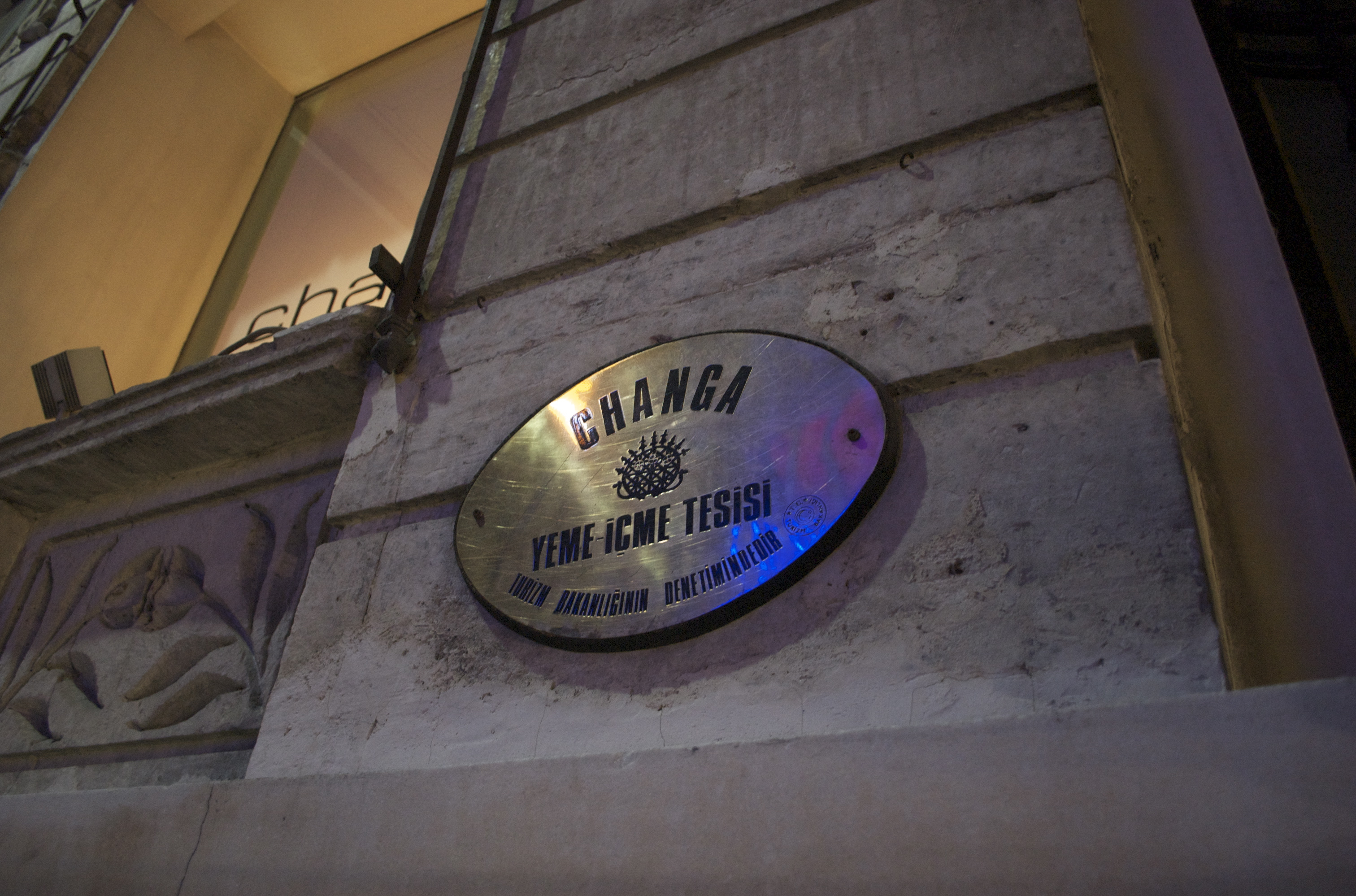
Changa, exterior view of sign

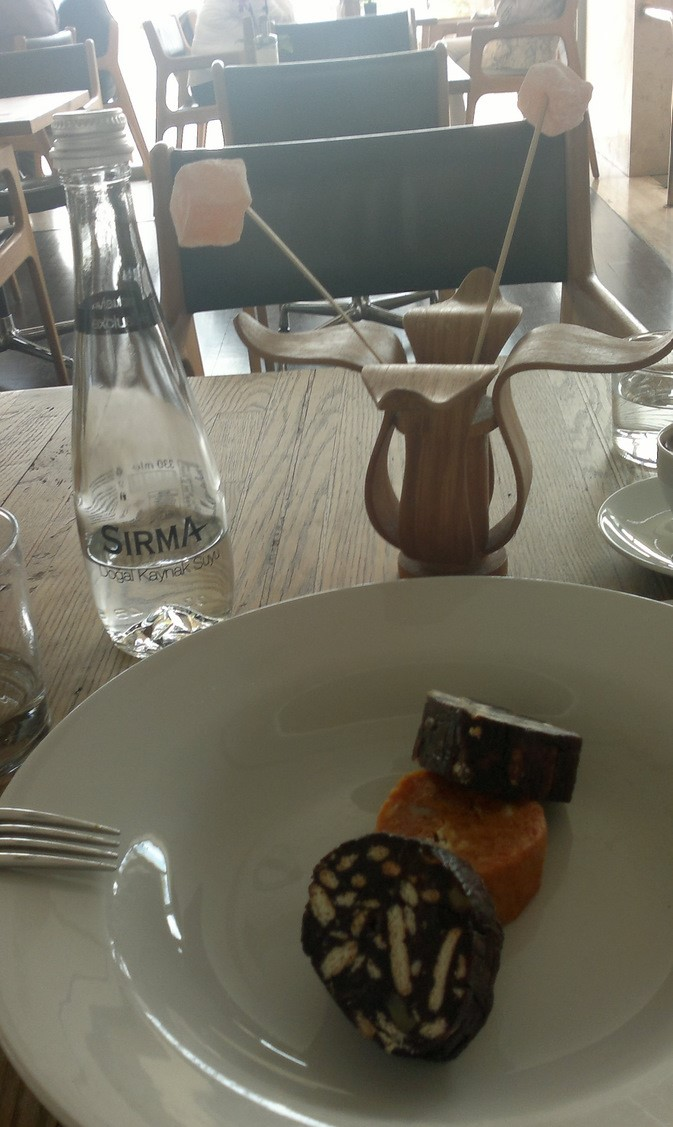
Changa interior

Changa is a restaurant in Istanbul, Turkey, established in 1999 and located close to Taksim Square. It is owned by restaurateurs Tarık Bayazıt and Savaş Ertunç, and operated under the consultancy and supervision of the renowned Kiwi chef Peter Gordon. In 2002, Changa was chosen 39th of the world's 50 top restaurants by the Restaurant magazine.

Named after the Swahili language word for "mix", Changa is situated in a restored house of Art Nouveau style built in 1903, occupying its all four floors. The interior is a combination of classic style with modern elements. The restaurant can host 90 people at a time and the bar can handle up to 40. For private occasions, the dining room on the fourth floor can accommodate between twelve and thirty persons.

The kitchen presents Turkish cuisine blended in line with modern style dishes of Pacific Rim utilizing fusion-method cookery that allows natural ingredients with international flavors to be marinated, cooked and served all in harmony on the same plate. Fusion food is cooking without borders, melting two or more ingredients from two different cuisines to create a new single dish that complements the individual flavors and ingredients. The fusion technique is centuries-old and was born when the Chinese people moved to America, the Americans adopted the Mexican food, the Africans came to Europe and the French discovered the Indo-Chinese cuisine. However, this type of food was criticized by some gastronomers for having no rules and no defined techniques without respecting the traditional recipes.

In addition to its ranking at the "Top 50", the venue was honored in 2002 with "Overall Excellence Award" by the Time Out magazine.

== Branches ==
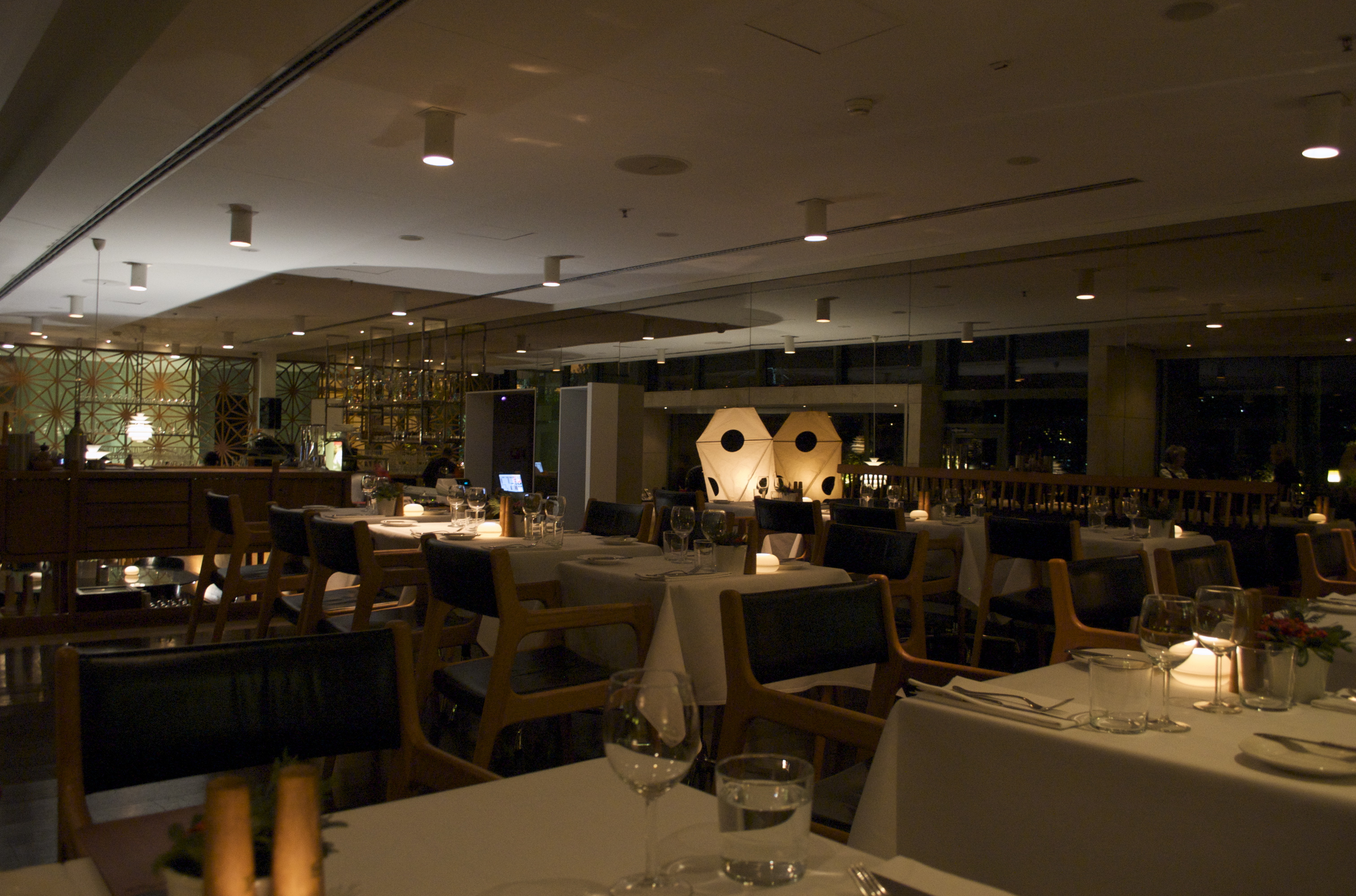
Müzedechanga

Changa has made a joint effort with a renowned hotel in Bodrum opening a beach restaurant and bar in 2002.

In 2005 the restaurant opened another branch, "Müzedechanga" (literally: "Changa at the museum"), at the Sakıp Sabancı Museum in Istanbul overlooking the Bosphorus.

In 2007, Müzedechanga has won prestigious Wallpaper Design Award for "Best New Restaurant".
