= Peter Gordon (chef) =

New Zealand chef (born 1963)

Peter Gordon ONZM
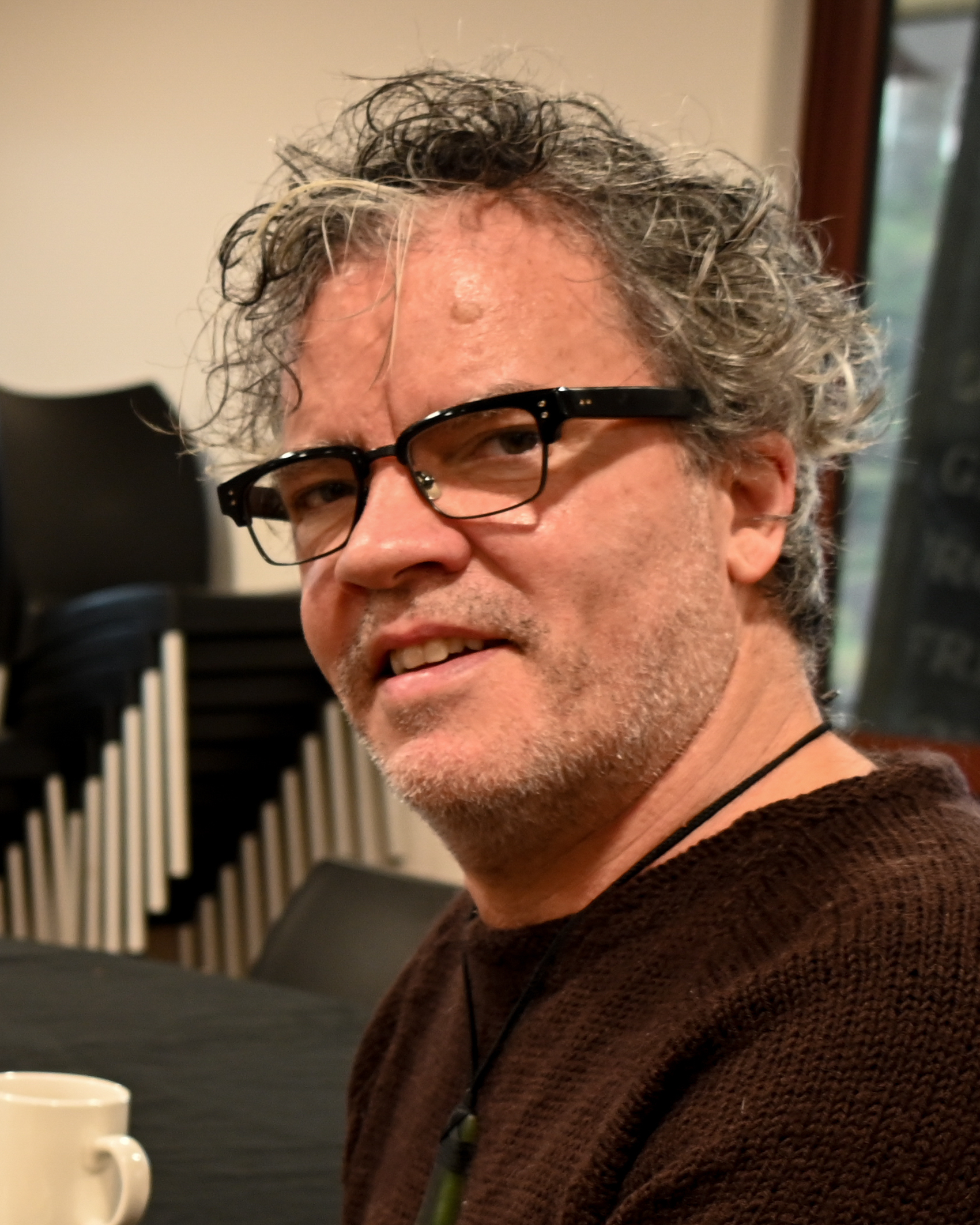
- Gordon in 2022
- Born: 1963 (age 62–63); Whanganui, New Zealand
- Culinary career
- Current restaurant(s): The Sugar Club (Auckland) The Providores (London) Gourmet Burger Kitchen (London) changa (Istanbul) PUBLIC (New York City) Bellota (Auckland)

Peter Gordon ONZM (born 1963) is a New Zealand chef, who has had restaurants in London, Auckland, New York, Istanbul and Wellington.

== Early life ==
Gordon was born in Whanganui. His father is Bruce Gordon. Gordon is of Ngāti Kahungunu and Ngāi Tahu descent.

== Education ==
After moving to Melbourne in 1981, completing a four-year cookery apprenticeship and working as a chef in various restaurants, his spirit of adventure and culinary curiosity led him to travel through Asia for a year from Indonesia through to India. This experience was to become a major influence on his culinary style, which is now called fusion.

== Career ==
Gordon set up the kitchen of the original "Sugar Club" restaurant in Wellington in 1986. After almost three years running the kitchen, he moved to London. Working in several British restaurants, a private country home and event catering, Gordon set up the British kitchens of The Sugar Club in London's Notting Hill (1995) and West Soho (1998). In 1996, the Notting Hill restaurant won a Time Out award for Best Modern British Restaurant, and an Eros award from the Evening Standard for Best Pacific Rim Restaurant. The Soho restaurant was voted Best Central London Restaurant in 1999 in the Time Out Restaurant Awards.

In 2001, he set up The Providores and Tapa Room Restaurant on Marylebone High Street with then life-partner Michael McGrath and two other partners. The Providores closed in July 2019 after 18 years.

In 2004, he set up the "dine by Peter Gordon" restaurant in the SKYCITY Grand Hotel in Auckland followed soon by the Bellota tapas bar in 2006. In July 2013, dine by Peter Gordon was closed to make way for the fourth iteration of "The Sugar Club" in the SKYCITY Hotel in Auckland, at the top of the SKY Tower.

Gordon is also a co-founder of artisan doughnut company Crosstown Doughnuts, which launched in London in April 2014.

He has appeared on British television, on programmes such as Saturday Kitchen, Sunday Brunch and Nigel Slater and Jamie Oliver's Channel 4 food series, as well as being a guest judge on MasterChef New Zealand. Most recently, he presented and was the executive producer of Native Kitchen (TV3 and Māori Television in NZ), a 10-part TV series in which he mentored a group of aspiring, young Māori chefs through a 10-day culinary boot camp. Peter has written eight books and contributed to a dozen others. His latest book, SAVOUR: Salads for all Seasons, was published in April 2016 by Jacqui Small.

On 11 December 2016, Gordon presented the "Food Hour: Southern China" episode on the U.S. series Globe Trekker, a travel and adventure programme which aims to offer exotic locales, peoples, foods, traditions, and customs. Globe Trekker airs on the American non-profit, viewer-supported TV network PBS. The episode centered on the cuisine of southern China's Guangdong and very large provincial capital city of Guangzhou, formerly known as Canton, which gave the world its beloved Cantonese cuisine.

In 1999, Gordon was the first to receive the New Zealander of the Year award from the New Zealand Society in London. In the 2009 New Year Honours Gordon was appointed an Officer of the New Zealand Order of Merit for services to the food industry.

In 2019, Gordon won Supreme Winner at the KEA World Class New Zealand Awards.

In 2020, after returning to Auckland, New Zealand permanently, Peter, along with his life and business partner Alastair Carruthers, opened Homeland, a restaurant and cooking school focusing on supporting New Zealand and Pacific producers and local communities. It closed in 2024.

Gordon was co-judge of Season 4 (2022) of The Great Kiwi Bake Off.

== Restaurants ==
- The Providores and Tapa Room (London, UK) - now closed
- Kopapa (Covent Garden, London, UK) - now closed
- dine by Peter Gordon at SKYCITY Grand Hotel (Auckland, New Zealand) - now closed
- Bellota tapas bar at SKYCITY (Auckland, New Zealand) - now closed
- Gourmet Burger Kitchen - former consultant chef’
- changa, and müzedechanga restaurant (Istanbul, Turkey)
- PUBLIC - helped set up (New York City)
- The Sugar Club (Original) - now closed
- The Sugar Club - SKYCITY (Auckland, New Zealand) - now no longer associated
- Homeland (Auckland, New Zealand)

== Personal life ==
Gordon is of Māori and Scottish descent. He is the youngest of four siblings from his mother and father. He also has 4 half siblings from his parents’ subsequent relationships. He moved to Melbourne in 1981 where he first decided to be a chef.

Since 1999 he has organised an annual charity event "Who's Cooking Dinner?" to raise money for Leukaemia and blood cancer research, since he successfully donated bone marrow to his sister. He has raised over £7 million since starting this event. Peter is also a patron of The New Zealand LAM Charitable Trust and The Raukatauri Music Therapy Centre, and an ambassador to KiwiHarvest.

Gordon has been in a relationship with his partner, Alastair Carruthers, Chair of TVNZ and The NZ Film Commission. They returned to live permanently in New Zealand in 2020.
