= Sakıp Sabancı Museum =

- Sakıp Sabancı Müzesi
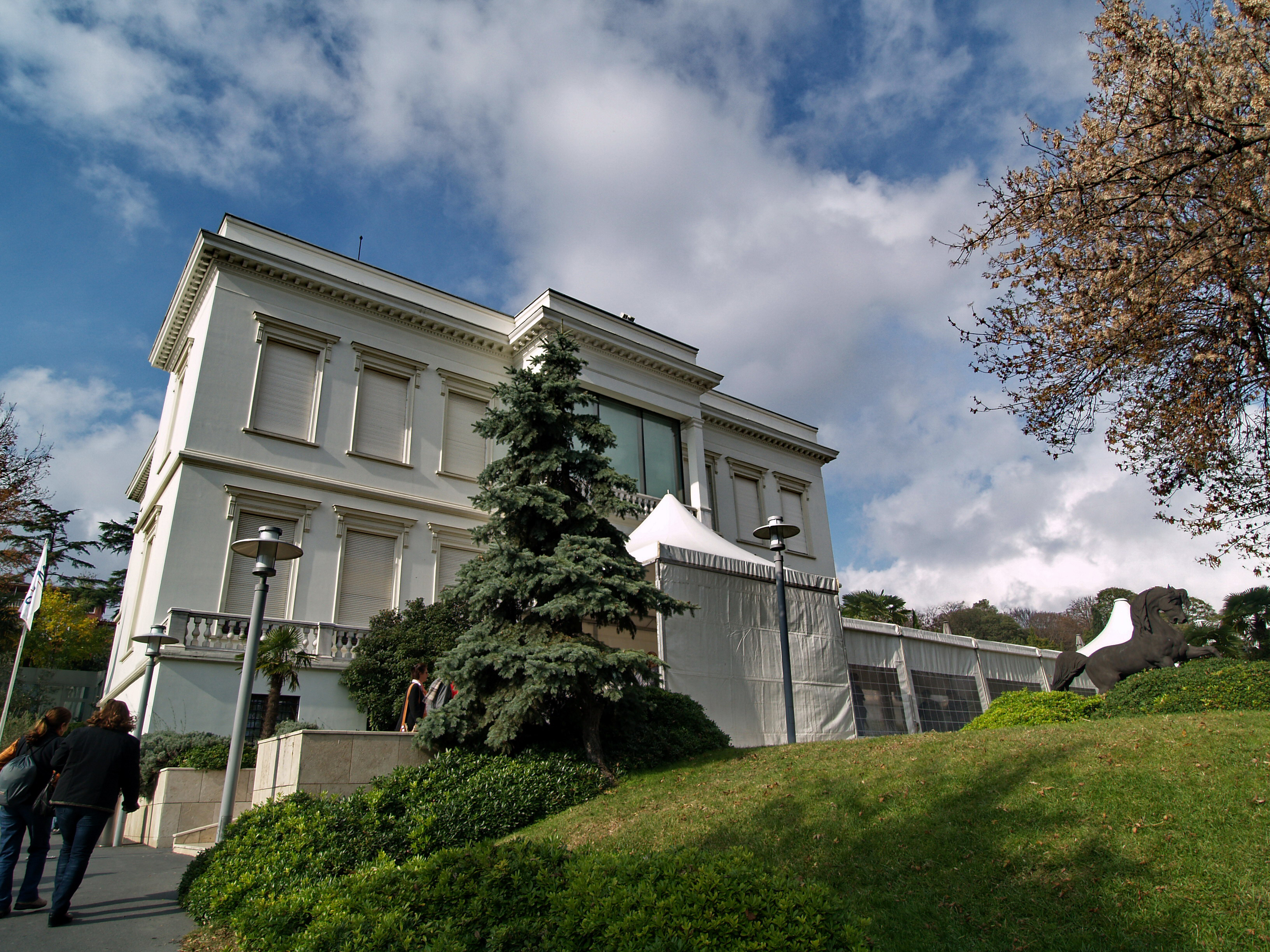
- Sakip Sabanci Museum
- Interactive fullscreen map
- Established: 2002
- Location: Emirgan, Istanbul
- Coordinates: 41°05′57″N 29°03′13″E
- Type: University museum of art, calligraphy and archaeology
- Director: Nazan Ölçer
- Website: sakipsabancimuzesi.org

The Sabancı University Sakıp Sabancı Museum (Turkish: Sakıp Sabancı Müzesi) is a private fine arts museum in Istanbul, Turkey, dedicated to calligraphic art, religious and state documents, as well as paintings of the Ottoman era. The museum was founded by Sakıp Sabancı, and was opened in June 2002. Aside from permanent exhibitions, the museum also hosts national and foreign temporary exhibitions and, hosts cultural events on the weekends.

Recently the museum gained worldwide attention when it exhibited the works of Pablo Picasso and Auguste Rodin.

== History of the mansion ==
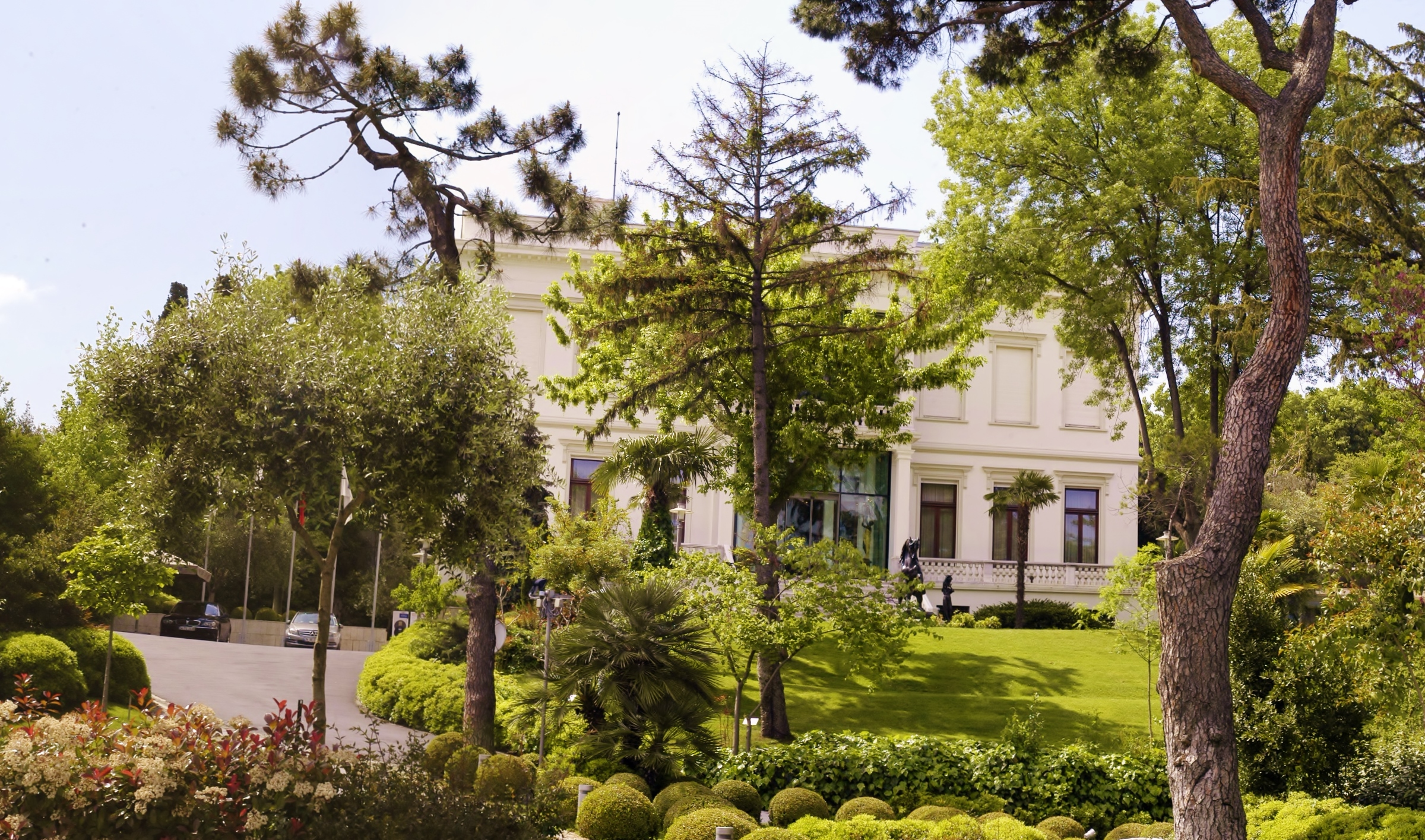
"Atlı Köşk"

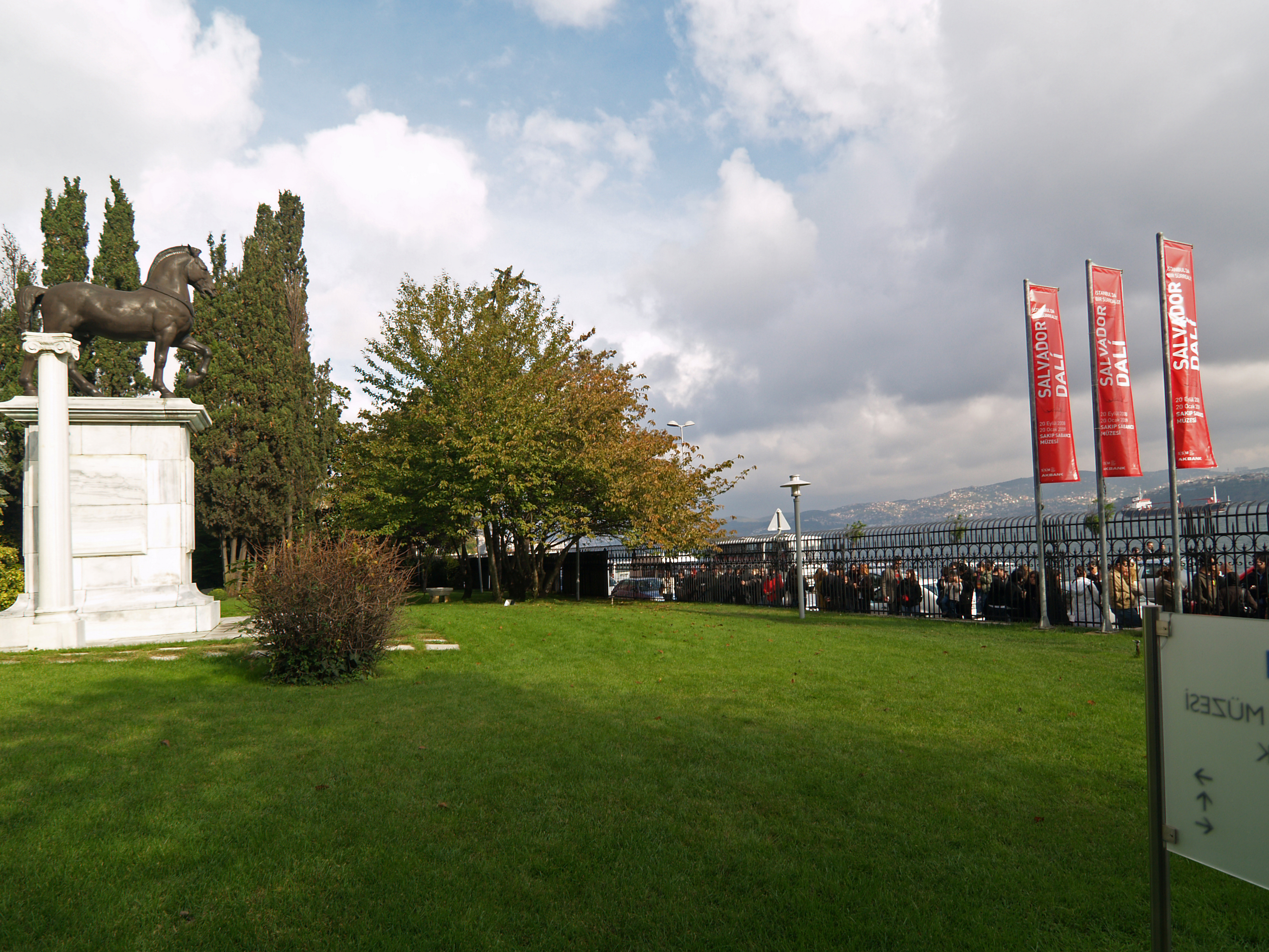
Inside the entrance gate of the mansion - the statue of the horse (left), and a queue waiting to visit the exhibition "Salvador Dalí: A Surrealist in Istanbul"

The historical building belonged to several high ranked pasha families and khedives, Egyptian governors, from 1848 until 1884, when it was purchased by the Ottoman Treasury on the orders of Sultan Abdülhamid II and presented as a gift to King Nicola I of Montenegro. The mansion served the next 30 years as a royal residence and embassy of Montenegro. In 1913, the Ottoman government repossessed it, which became home to the granddaughter of Sultan Mehmed V Reşad. After the foundation of the Turkish Republic, Prince Mehmed Ali Hasan, grandson of Khedive İsmail Paşa, purchased the then derelict house and commissioned the architect Edouard de Nari to build the present house. However, it remained unused for many years until the elder sister of the Egyptian prince made it her home in 1944.

In 1951 Hacı Ömer Sabancı, father of Sakıp Sabancı and founder of Sabancı Holding, purchased the mansion for spending summer months with his family. Inside the entrance gate of his mansion, he placed the bronze statue of a horse, he purchased at an auction. The sculpture was designed by Louis-Joseph Daumas in Paris in 1864 and cast by Vor Thiebaut. The house became popularly known as Atlı Köşk (Equestrian Villa). He and his family lived in the mansion until his decease in 1966. The mansion was home to Sakıp Sabancı and family between 1969 and 1999.

The mansion was leased in 1998 for a period of 49 years to Sabancı University along with all the antique furnishings and art collections. Today, the original mansion and a modern gallery annex host extensive art collections of 19th and 20th century.

== Exhibits ==
=== Collection ===
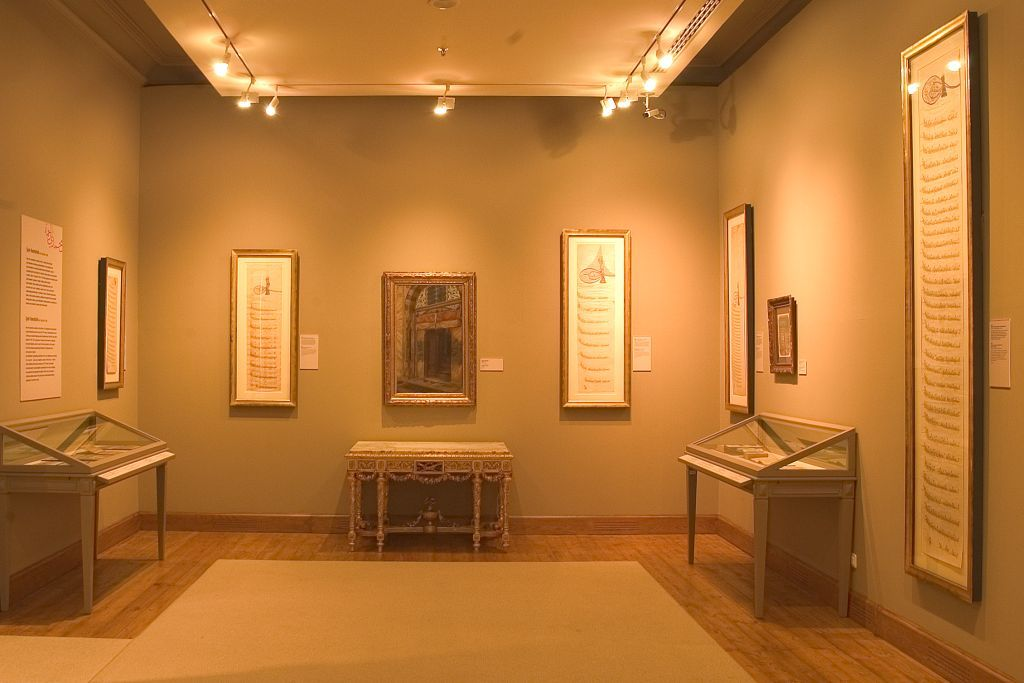
Collection of Ottoman Calligraphy

Hacı Ömer Sabancı began collecting decorative art works consisting of figurines, metalwork, porcelain, objets d'art and furniture in 1940. Sakıp Sabancı expanded the art collection of his father since 1970. The collection includes 18th and 19th century Chinese porcelain Famille noire and Famille verte, polychrome vases and decorated plates. An impressive collection of 19th century French porcelain, including large numbers of Sèvres vases, and German porcelain produced in Berlin and Vienna are among the most valuable items in the collection.

The collection of calligraphy consisting of nearly 400 pieces offers a comprehensive view of Ottoman calligraphic art over a period of 500 years, with manuscript Korans and prayer books, calligraphic panels, decrees, imperial documents, declarations, imperial seals, poetry books and calligraphic tools.

More than 320 selected paintings of Ottoman and Republican era belonging to Sabancı painting collection are on display, the works of notable Ottoman and Turkish artists like Osman Hamdi Bey, İbrahim Çallı, Halil Paşa, Nazmi Ziya Güran, Şeker Ahmet Paşa, Fikret Mualla and European artists like Fausto Zonaro and Ivan Ayvazovsky who lived and worked in the Ottoman Empire, either independently or as court pai

Items memorizing Sakıp Sabancı as pictures taken with personalities and statespersons, decorations and medals and some personal belongings are also on show.

=== Temporary exhibitions ===
Temporary exhibitions that have taken place in and have left from the museum are listed below in chronological order:

- (27.06.2003 - 05.05.2004) Partnership of Power: Artifacts from the Istanbul Archaeology Museum, Man and Horse
- (21.12.2003 - 18.04.2004) From the Medicis to the Savoias: Ottoman Splendour in Florentine Collections
- (12.05.2004 - 24.10.2004) Paris - St. Petersburg: Three Centuries of European Fashion from the Alexandre Vassiliev Collection
- (24.05.2005 - 28.08.2005) Pieces gathered together from Topkapı Palace Museum's collection of European Porcelain at the Ottoman Palace
- (13.07.2005 - 09.10.2005) Pieces gathered together from the collections of Austrian, English, Slovenian, Croatian and Turkish museums called The Image of Turks in Europe in the 17th Century.
- (24.11.2005 - 26.03.2006) Picasso in Istanbul
- (14.04.2006 - 28.05.2006) The Art of the Book from East to West and Memories of the Ottoman World: Masterpieces from the Calouste Gulbenkian Museum in Lisbon
- (13.06.2006 - 03.09.2006) Master Sculptor Rodin in Istanbul
- (07.12.2006 - 08.04.2007) Genghis Khan and His Heirs: The Great Mongol Empire
- (19.04.2007 - 19.08.2007) In Praise of God: Anatolian Rugs in Transylvanian Churches, 1500–1750, and Kaitag Embroideries and Textile Art from the Daghestan
- (08.09.2007 - 01.11.2007) Blind Date, Istanbul
- (24.11.2007 - 27.01.2008) The World of Abidin Dino
- (11.12.2007 - 02.03.2008) Lines in Gold Ottoman Calligraphy from the Sakıp Sabancı Museum, Istanbul, in Real Academia de Bellas Artes de San Fernando, Madrid
- (18.02.2008 - 01.06.2008) Istanbul, Isfahan and Delhi: Three Capitals of Islamic Masterpieces from the Louvre Collection
- (04.04.2008 - 15.06.2008) Ottoman Calligraphy from the Sakıp Sabancı Museum in Real Alcázar, Sevilla
- (20.09.2008 - 01.02.2009) Salvador Dalí: A Surrealist in Istanbul
- (16.04.2009 - 30.06.2009) Travel to the West: 70 Years of Turkish Painting
- (14.05.2009 - 02.08.2009) Lisbon: Memories from Another City
- (10.08.2009 - 20.08.2009) Flow
- (09.09.2009 - 01.11.2009) Joseph Beuys and His Students: Works From the Deutsche Bank Collection
- (19.11.2009 - 20.03.2010) Venice and Istanbul during the Ottoman Period: Love by any other name
- (15.04.2010 - 27.06.2010) Transcending Borders With Brush and Pen: Selected Works of Eastern and Western Calligraphy
- (05.06.2010 - 26.09.2010) Legendary Istanbul: From Byzantion to Istanbul, 8000 Years of a Capital
- (05.11.2010 - 13.03.2011) Treasures of the Aga Khan Museum
- (11.11.2010 - 09.01.2011) "The Jameel Prize 2009" exhibition of the Victoria and Albert Museum
- (23.05.2011 - 30.10.2011) Across: The Cyclades and Western Anatolia During the 3rd Millennium BC
- (17.09.2011 - 31.12.2011) SSM hosts Sophie Calle with "For the Last and First Time"
- (22.02.2012 - 10.06.2012) "Where Darkness Meets Light..." Rembrandt and His Contemporaries: The Golden Age of Dutch Art
- (30 May - 22 September 2013) Fan from Past to Present
- (29 June 2012 - 16 September 2012)CoBrA- 1000 Days of Free Art
- (9 October 2012 - 6 January 2013) Monet's Garden
- (25 April - 11 August 2013) 1001 Faces of Orientalism
- (10 September 2013 - 2 February 2014) Anish Kapoor in Istanbul
- (19 January - 13 April 2014) Masterpieces from the SSM Collections in Bahrain ‘Five Hundred Years of Islamic Calligraphy’
- (7 March - 15 June 2014) Distant Neighbour Close Memories: 600th Anniversary of Turkish - Polish Relations
- (29 April - 10 August 2014) "THE PORTRAIT OF SAKIP SABANCI" – Kutluğ Ataman
- (23 September 2014 - 8 March 2015)Joan Miró. Women, Birds, Stars
- (9 April 2015 – 26 July 2015) "Buluşma…Reunion"

==== Notable inbound exhibitions ====
===== Picasso in Istanbul =====
"Picasso in Istanbul" was the first ever temporary exhibition featuring a collection of 135 unexhibited pieces by Pablo Picasso. There were 20 paintings selected by the artist's grandson, Bernard Ruiz-Picasso, from different periods that Picasso kept for himself and were part of the Picasso family's private collection. Other pieces came from the Picasso museums in Barcelona, Málaga in Spain and Paris, France. The show also featured sculptures, ceramics and textiles, as well as photographs taken by Picasso and photographs of the artist taken by famous photographers. The show, held from November 24, 2005, until March 26, 2006, was visited by more than 250.000 people.

===== Master Sculptor Rodin in Istanbul =====
The second notable temporary exhibition at the museum was dedicated to Auguste Rodin with the title "The Master Sculptor Rodin in İstanbul", featuring selected artworks by the great master of the art of sculpture. 203 artpieces were on display from June 13, 2006, to September 3, 2006, which were loaned from the Musée Rodin in Paris, France. The show hosted Rodin's masterworks as The Thinker, The Kiss, The Burghers of Calais, The Monument to Balzac, The Walking Man, statues derived from the famous The Gates of Hell composition and nearly a hundred other sculptures in marble, bronze and plaster as well as 58 drawings, 23 archival photographs and 19 antique-style statues from Rodin's private collection. With the permission of Rodin Museum, visually impaired people were able to touch 14 statues having labels with the Braille alphabet. The bronze horse statue in the front garten of the museum, which gave the mansion its name since 1952, made temporarily place to Rodin's The Monument to Victor Hugo on the occasion of the exhibition.

===== Genghis Khan and His Heirs, The Great Mongol Empire =====
The museum's third major temporary exhibition, which was held between December 7, 2006, and April 8, 2007, was dedicated to Genghis Khan in conjunction with the 800th anniversary of the founding of the Mongol Empire. Titled "Genghis Khan and His Heirs, The Great Mongol Empire", it showed 600 pieces from major museums in Germany, Austria, Mongolia and Turkey, some of which were seen by the public for the first time.

===== The World of Abidin Dino =====
Between November 24, 2007, through January 27, 2008, the museum hosted works and documents of the renowned Turkish painter Abidin Dino, a multi-faceted artist and man of culture, who died in 1993. The comprehensive exhibition comprised his drawings and writings along with photographs and documents chronicling the various periods throughout his 80 years in Turkey, France and other countries.

===== Istanbul, Isfahan, Delhi Three Capitals of Islamic Art Masterpieces from the Louvre Collection =====
From February 19 through June 1, 2008, the museum exhibited around 220 objects from the Islamic Arts department of the Louvre Museum in Paris, France. The selected works are representative for the common and different art directions in the cultural reflections of historical relations between the Ottomans (1299–1923), the Safavid dynasty (1501–1722) in Iran and the Baburid dynasty (1526–1858) in the Indian subcontinent that all shared the cultural heritage of the Timurid dynasty (1396–1510), who ruled once on the broad Iranian plateau.

===== Legendary Istanbul - From Byzantion to Istanbul: 8000 Years of A Capital =====
To celebrate the selection of Istanbul as the European Capital of Culture for 2010, SSM is hosting an exhibition entitled "From Byzantion to Istanbul: 8000 Years of A Capital". The exhibition, which is on display from June 5 to September 4, 2010, presents the peerless history of Istanbul from its founding until today with over 500 works, some of which are the discoveries from the Yenikapı excavation conducted as part of the Marmaray Project, which goes back 8000 years.

===== Treasures of the Aga Khan Museum =====
From November 5, 2010, to March 13, 2011, the Aga Khan Museum collection visited the Sakip Sabanci Museum in Istanbul, Turkey. Entitled Treasures of Aga Khan Museum, the exhibition was held within the framework of Istanbul 2010 - European Capital of Culture. For the first time since Parma in 2007, the artefacts on display were not a general presentation of "highlights" from the collection, but it was an exhibition that brought together examples of the written word on a variety of objects (ceramics, wood, metalwork, textiles, etc.) with their counterparts on parchment and paper. The exhibition aimed to show how the art of the book - in calligraphy, illumination and illustration - evolved over time in the Islamic world.

===== Across - The Cyclades and Western Anatolia During the 3rd Millennium BC =====
The exhibition, entitled "Across - The Cyclades and Western Anatolia During the 3rd Millennium BC" was composed of artifacts from various Turkish museums as well as the National Archaeological Museum of Athens and the N. P. Goulandris Foundation Museum of Cycladic Art. The exhibition examined the relations between Anatolia, where the first steps towards civilization took place, and the nearby Cyclades Islands in the Aegean that gave rise to reciprocal influence that created two cultures which while similar in many respects, nonetheless maintained distinctive regional characteristics.

===== Sophie Calle: "For the Last and First Time" =====
In the exhibition, the artist examined from her unique perspective with both the last "visions" of people who are visually handicapped and the "inhabitants of Istanbul who have never seen the sea", a topic that has attracted the interest of many in the worlds of academia and art.

===== Where Darkness Meets Light… Rembrandt and His Contemporaries - The Golden Age of Dutch Art =====
The exhibition marks the 400th year of diplomatic relations between Turkey and the Netherlands and features works from the Rijksmuseum as well as one of the world's leading private collections, which are being displayed for the first time in Turkey. Besides Rembrandt, the exhibition presented a total number of 110 works; 73 paintings, 19 drawings and 18 objects by 59 artists including major representatives of Dutch art. Additionally, the exhibition presented the painting "The Love Letter" by Johannes Vermeer, who remained an obscure figure for centuries with his works being attributed to other artists for a long time.

===== Cobra - 1000 Days of Free Art =====
The exhibition boasted a wide selection of the most prominent works of the Cobra movement that shaped the art environment of the second half of the twentieth century, featuring over 60 artworks by Cobra artists.

===== Monet's Garden =====
The exhibition consisted of works from the late period of the artist who gave the impressionist movement its name; including pictures of Claude Monet’s house in the Giverny Garden, garden scenes, water lilies and his famous Japanese bridge paintings. In addition signed portraits of Monet and his wife Camille by Auguste Renoir, personal possessions and photographs will be exhibited. The exhibition gave insight into Monet's innovative approaches during an artistic career that stretched into the first quarter of the 20th century, and his rejection of tradition that inspired young artists in the 1940s and 50s.

===== The 1001 Faces of Orientalism =====
The exhibition, studied the 19th century Orientalism analysing its effects on diversified areas such as literature, archaeology, painting, architecture, universal exhibitions, photography and fashion. Rare books, photographs from the archaeological excavation sites, examples of Ottoman architecture, interior and stage decorations, costumes, studio photographs and souvenirs were presented in the "1001 Faces of Orientalism" exhibition.

===== Fan From Past to Present =====
The exhibition presented to art lovers the private collection of Nurcan Artam, Artam Antik INC. CEO., of around 120 rare fans dating back to between 1720 and 1900 as well as oil paintings that reflect the importance of fans as one of the most interesting accessories in the history of clothing.

===== Anish Kapoor in İstanbul =====
The exhibition, which was curated by Sir Norman Rosenthal, was the first to focus on Anish Kapoor's stone sculptures in marble, alabaster and other materials, many of which had not been seen in public before. The exhibition also included iconic works such as Sky Mirror and Yellow, bringing together sculpture, architecture, engineering and technology.

===== Distant Neighbour Close Memories: 600th Anniversary of Turkish - Polish Relations =====
The exhibition covered a period beginning in the first half of the 15th century and continuing with trade, peace and war up to the late 17th century, when the Second Siege of Vienna became a turning point not just in relations between Ottoman Turkey and Poland, but in the history of Europe. The exhibition opened under the patronage of the presidents of Turkey and Poland, supported by the ministries of foreign affairs and culture in both countries, with exhibits loaned from the collections of museums, archives, libraries, monasteries and churches in Poland, making a total of 348 exhibits.

===== The portrait of Sakip Sabanci =====
The video installation titled Sakıp Sabancı by Kutluğ Ataman is a portrait of the late Turkish industrialist, commissioned by the Sakıp Sabancı Family in 2011 for the 10th anniversary of the prominent philanthropist's passing. The work, consisting of photographs of the thousands of people who touched Sakıp Sabancı in some way throughout his life, reflects the businessman's thoughts on human beings, life and art as well as his energy. Then again the work multiplies, underlining and giving meaning to human existence which will continue virtually forever. Kutluğ Ataman created this work which constitutes a moment of silence in honour of Sakıp Sabancı and emphasizes his contribution to the development of technology in Turkey. Ataman used state-of-the-art technology in creating this work where the "raw material is, as a whole, human." The artwork was invited to be exhibited at the Arsenale section of the 56th Venice Biennale titled "All the World’s Futures", where it will be on view through May 9, 2015 – November 22, 2015.

===== Joan Miró. Women, Birds, Stars =====
The exhibition focused on the maturity period of the groundbreaking and multi-faceted artist, exhibiting on woman, bird and star themes of Miró, who was heavily inspired by his observations on the Mediterranean geography and people throughout his career. The exhibition provided the opportunity for viewers to understand the symbolic language of the artist through a rich selection of artworks in different mediums such as oil on canvas, sculpture, lithography and ceramics. With this exhibition, art enthusiasts in Istanbul will be able to witness the various interpretations of the energy the artist drew from the Mediterranean culture. ‘Joan Miró. Women, Birds, Stars’ consists of a total of 125 works – oil and acrylic paintings, lithographs, etchings, and assemblages with relevant models and drawings as well as his textiles and ceramic works. Joan Miró. Women, Birds, Stars’ comprised a total of 125 works.

==== Outbound exhibitions ====
===== Ottoman Calligraphy from Sakıp Sabancı Museum =====
Selected artpieces from the Calligraphy Collection of the Sakıp Sabancı Museum, have been on display in Real Alcázar, in Seville from April 4, 2008, to June 15, 2008. The exhibition following the "Lines in Gold: Ottoman Calligraphy from Sakıp Sabancı Museum, Istanbul" exhibition held in Madrid Real Academia de Bellas Artes de San Fernando, comprised fine examples demonstrating the developments in the Ottoman art of calligraphy over a period of 500 years. Works of great Ottoman-era calligraphers including Sheikh Hamdullah were presented in a significant location bearing the influence of Islamic architecture, Real Alcázar which was built during the time of Almohads.

== digitalSSM: A comprehensive digital archive of art ==
digitalSSM has launched in 2013, marking the 10th anniversary of the SSM, and has proven to be one of the most innovative and comprehensive projects that the museum has conceived. The project provides the viewers from various backgrounds, such as academicians, art historians, art writers and critics, collectors and students, with access to the museum's collection through more than 77,000 high resolution images.

As the first digital platform in Turkey that covers the whole permanent collection in a museum, digitalSSM has also a primary role in the preservation of the cultural legacy. The platform contains all the content information related with the items in SSM's Arts of the Book and Calligraphy Collection, The Painting Collection, Abidin Dino Archive and Emirgan Archive.

By means of the software “CONTENTdm”, digitalSSM provides access to the museum's collection and archive from all around the world and offers searching facility through an advanced engine.

With respect to the open access policy, the whole collection and the archive is open to use without any requirement of registration or fee. Furthermore, both local and international researchers’ demands are met with the consideration of the copyright standards.

In addition to the high resolution images of the items in the collection, digitalSSM provides the user with related information, such as the artist, date, size, material, techniques, location and the previous owner. The users of the site are also given the option to add images, that they would like to re-examine in the future, to their favourites.

The most comprehensive content in the platform belongs to The Arts of the Book and Calligraphy Collection, and high resolution images, which enable the viewer to study all the pieces in the collection, page by page, are featured along with related academic researches. To name a few; the Koran edition, which reflects the style of the famous court gilder Kara Memi, of the Suleiman I era (1520–1566); the sole edition of the Koran inscribed by Bayezid II's (1481–1512) heir Şehzade Korkud; and the Koran edition that was inscribed by the famous calligrapher Hafız Osman in 1682 are to be found in digitalSSM's collection.

www.digitalssm.org

== Restaurant ==
Since 2005, the award-winning Turkish restaurant Changa has a branch "Müzedechanga" at the museum. Managed by chef Peter Gordon, the venue won Wallpaper* magazine's 2007 award for best-designed restaurant.

== See also ==
- Sabancı University
- Sakıp Sabancı
