= Hacı Ömer Sabancı Foundation =

Turkish philanthropic organization

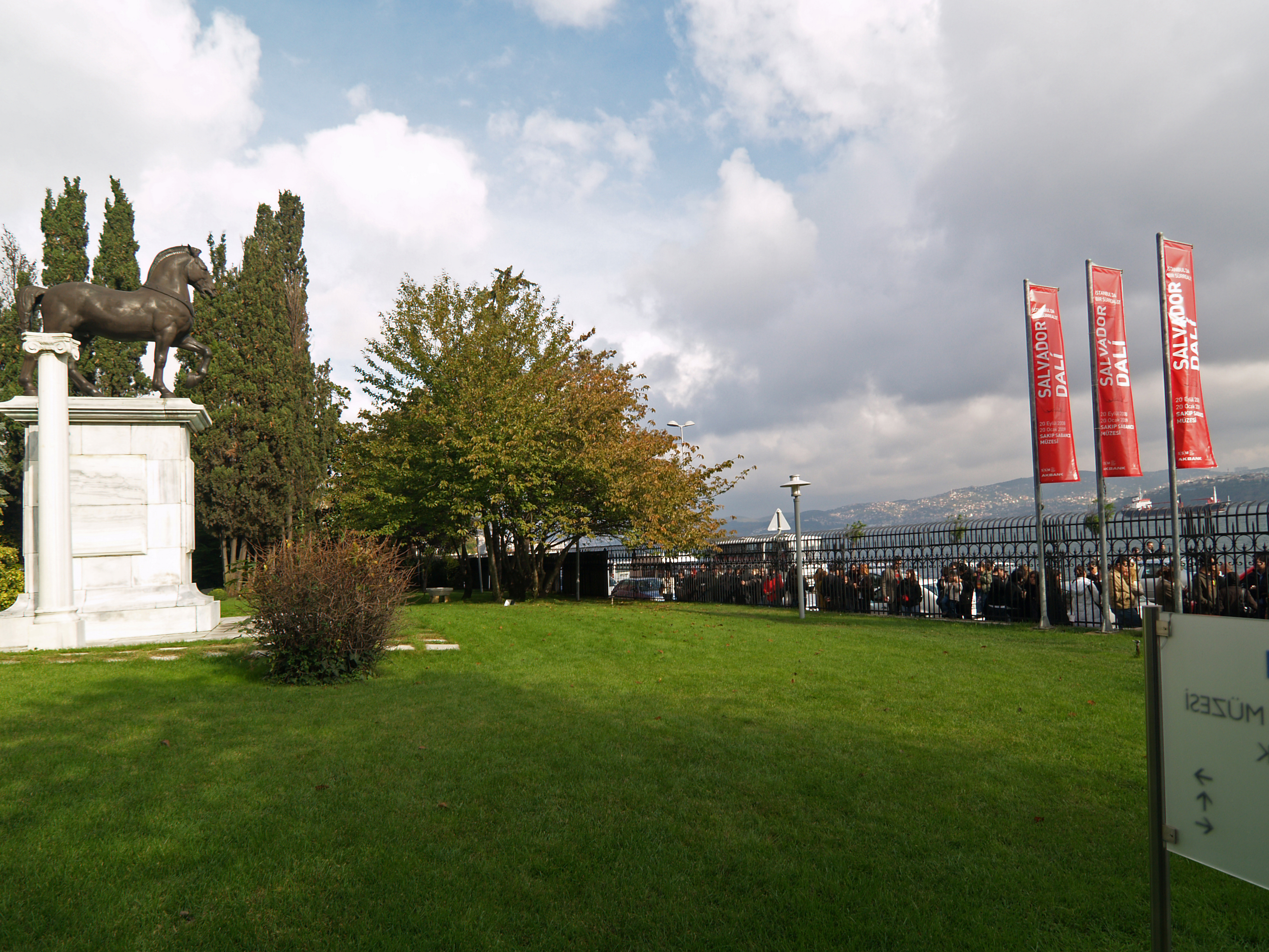
A queue at Sakip Sabancı Museum for the Salvador Dalí Exhibition, 2008

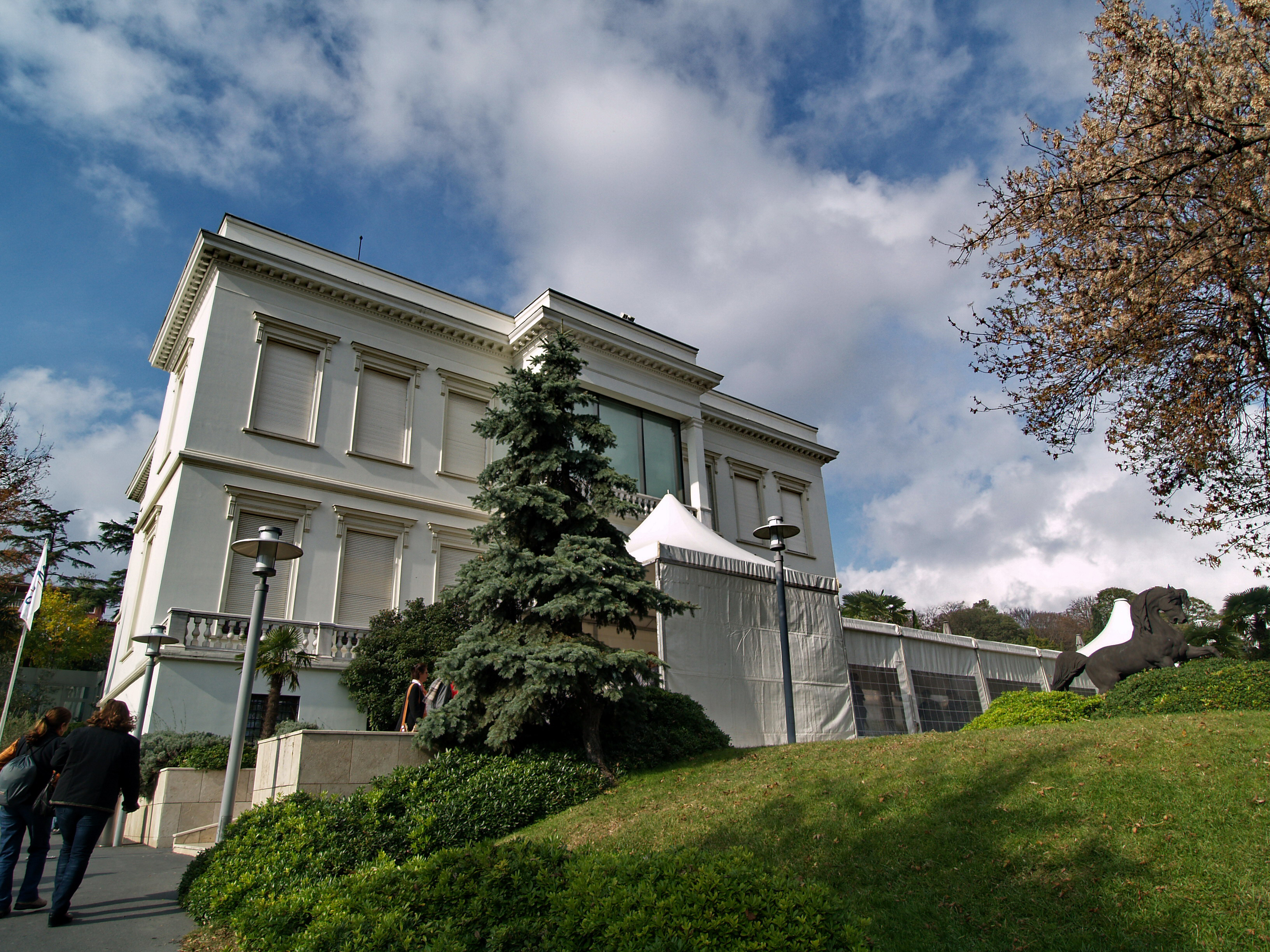
Sakıp Sabancı Museum in Istanbul, Turkey

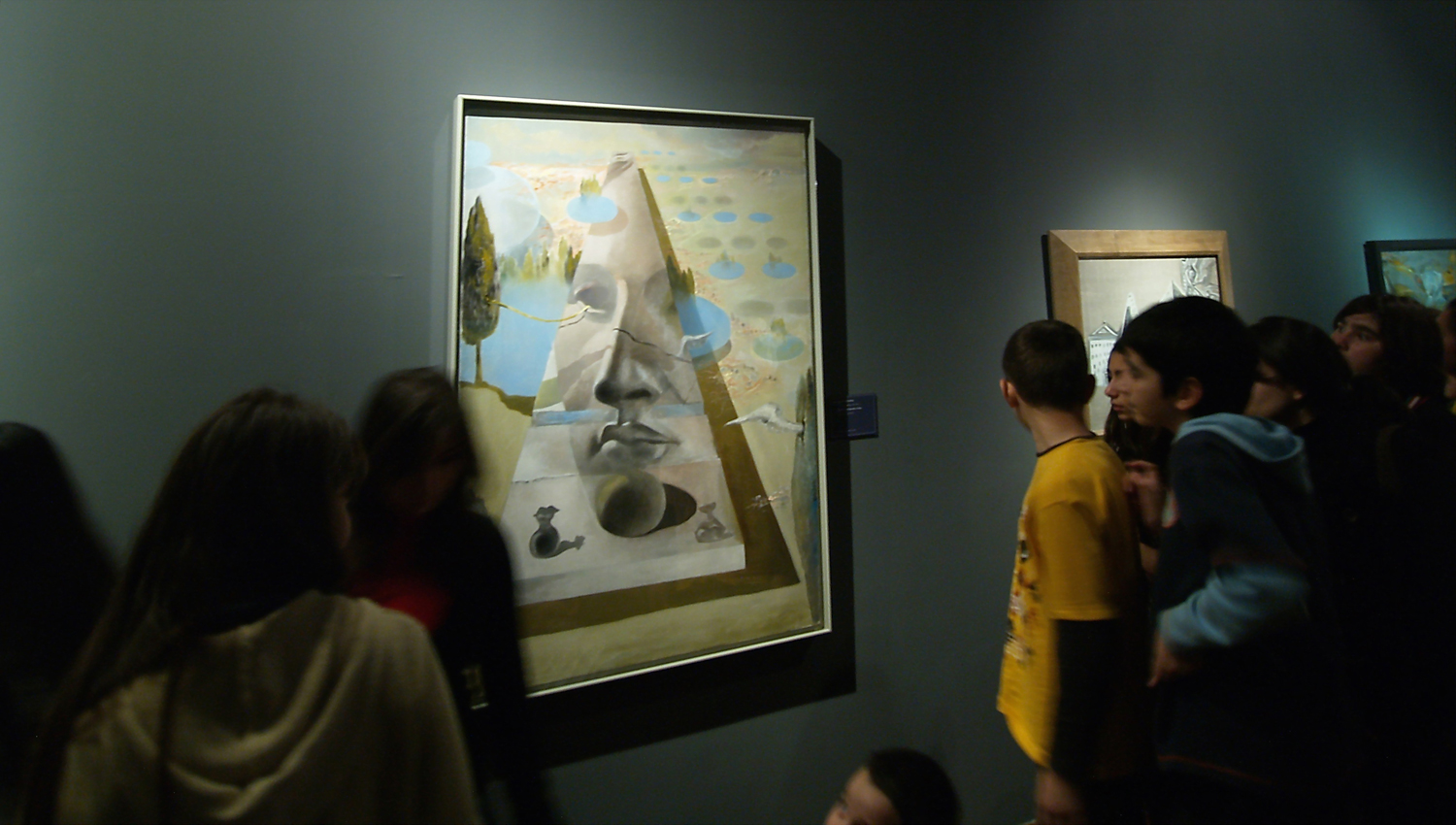
Children at Salvador Dalí's exhibition, organized by Sabancı Foundation, Istanbul

Hacı Ömer Sabancı Foundation, also known as the Sabancı Vakfı, is a Turkish philanthropic organization. Established in 1974, the foundation gives money for a variety of causes, including education and health. They award scholarships to college students, and sponsor other educational programs. Hacı Ömer Sabancı's sons established the philosophy "To give what this land has given to us back to its people" in perpetuity by formally founding the Hacı Ömer Sabancı Foundation, commonly known as the Sabancı Foundation, in 1974. This foundation institutionalizes the family's commitment to supporting the social and cultural development of Turkey.

Hacı Ömer Sabancı Foundation is named after Hacı Ömer Sabancı, the founder of Sabancı Holding. This foundation is referred to as the Sabancı Foundation or VAKSA for short. Sadıka Sabancı, the wife of Hacı Ömer Sabancı, was named Mother of the Year in 1975 for donating her entire estate to VAKSA. Hacı Ömer Sabancı Foundation is a member of the Third Sector Foundation of Turkey.

== See also ==
- Sabancı University
- Sakıp Sabancı Museum
- Dilek Sabancı Sport Hall
