= Sabancı University =

Private university in İstanbul, Turkey

- Sabancı Üniversitesi
- Motto: Birlikte Yaratmak ve Geliştirmek
- Motto in English: Creating and Developing Together
- Type: Private research university
- Established: 1994; 32 years ago
- Affiliations: Sabancı Foundation
- President: Yusuf Leblebici
- Location: Istanbul, Turkey; 40°53′25.97″N 29°22′42.19″E
- Campus: Suburban
- Colors: Navy blue
- Nicknames: Sabancı Seahawks (American football)
- Website: sabanciuniv.edu

University rankings

Global – Overall
- QS World: =404 (2026)

Regional – Overall
- QS Emerging Europe and Central Asia: 21 (2022)

Sabancı University (Turkish: Sabancı Üniversitesi) is a private research university that adopts a liberal arts education approach, established in 1994 and located on a 1.26 million square meter campus which is about 40 km from Istanbul's city center. Its first students matriculated in 1999. The first academic session started on October 20, 1999.

== History ==
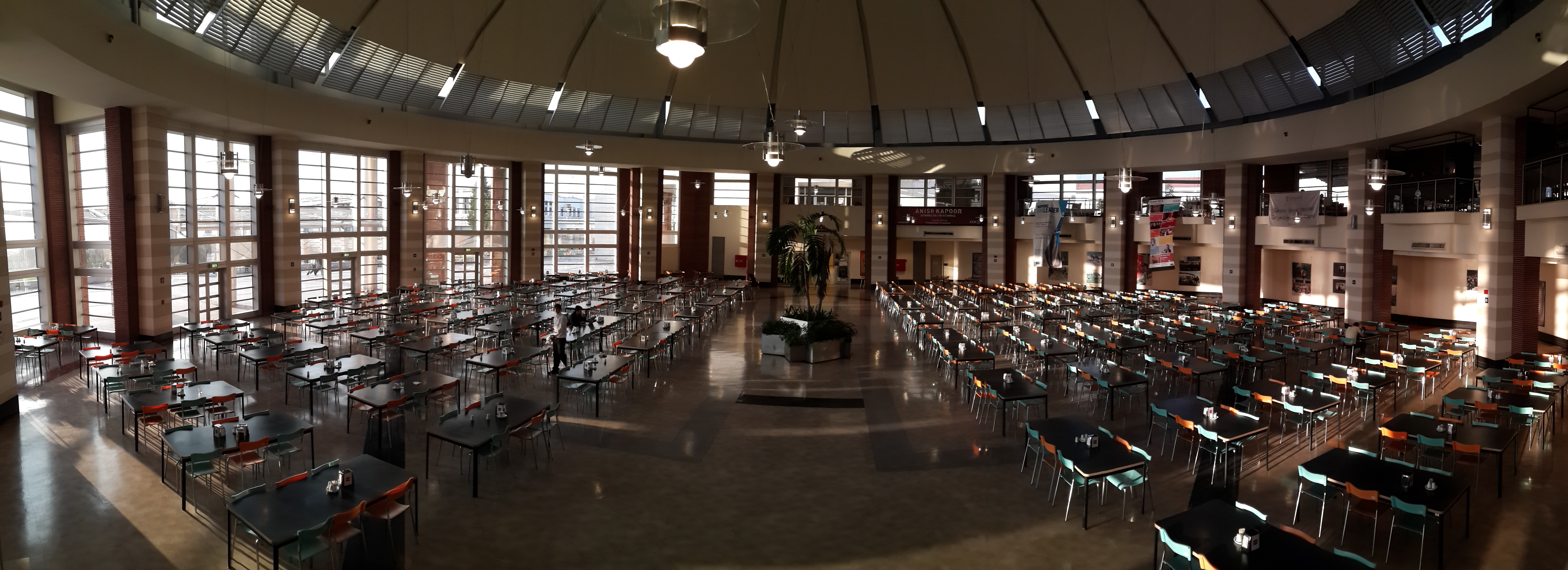
A panoramic view of the Sabancı University's Dining Hall.

Under the guidance of Sabancı Foundation, one of Turkey's leading family foundations, the Sabancı Group established Sabancı University in July 1994. More than 50 academics from 22 countries, students and private sector leaders participated in the Search Conference in August 1995. This conference was followed by university development committees, which worked under the direction of a Student Trend and Preference Survey and other academic program design activities.

The design of the campus was done by CannonDesign in association with the office of Turkish architect Turgut Toydemir. The groundbreaking ceremony for the Sabancı University campus took place on July 31, 1997. The university began its second academic year on October 20, 1999.

Sabancı University has three faculties and a language school: Faculty of Engineering and Natural Sciences, Faculty of Arts and Social Sciences, Sabancı Business School, and the School of Languages.

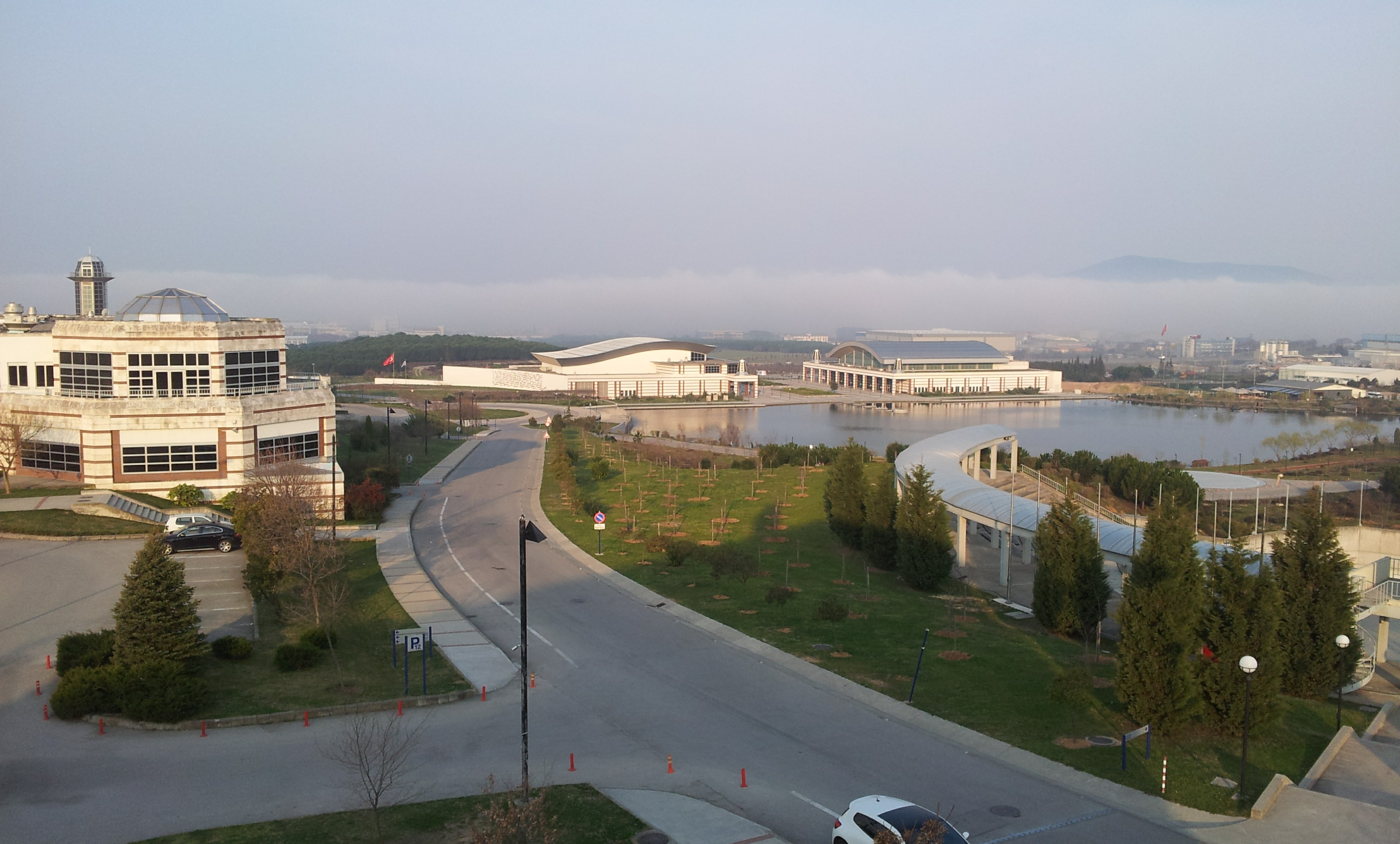
A view from the Sabancı University Dormitories.

== Curriculum ==
=== Foundations development program ===
Sabancı University's Foundations Development Program includes two key educational stages, the Foundations Development Year and University Courses. All student admits are required to take the English Language Assessment Exam, abbreviated as ELAE. Students deemed to require additional assistance enroll in the Foundations Development Year, which consists exclusively of English and Turkish language courses. The language coursework and the related exams are administered by the university's School of Languages. Students who pass the ELAE matriculate as freshmen. Subsequently, every Sabancı University student is required to take the University Courses – the core curriculum of the undergraduate program.

Foundations Development Year: Students who do not meet the university's English language proficiency standards enroll in the Foundations Development Year program. Depending on their ELAE score, these students are placed in one of three levels of language instruction: Basic, Intermediate, or Upper Intermediate. The university uses an instructional methodology that is course requirement- and content-based. As a result, FDY students emerge from the program with sufficient language proficiency as well as academic skills. Student success is judged not from examination results but overall performance in the program so they can seamlessly move on to the University Courses with their freshman classmates.

University Courses: University Courses is Sabancı University's core curriculum for undergraduates. Designed with a multidisciplinary approach, University Courses establishes links between the natural and social sciences as well as among other disciplines.

During the freshman year, students take courses that focus on Humanity and Society, Principles of Atatürk and History of Turkish Revolution, Turkish Language and Literature, Science of Nature, Mathematical Functions: Discrete and Continuous, Interfaculty Course: Computational Approaches to Problem Solving and Academic Literacies. In the sophomore year, students take “Major Works” courses that focus on various significant literary and artistic works. Law and Ethics, taken in either the junior or senior year, examines the complementary concepts of law and ethics in relation to everyday moral dilemmas and choices. With this multidisciplinary educational training, Sabancı University students emerge well-prepared to continue their education at the graduate level or start careers in any number of fields.

== Rankings ==
In fall 2014, Sabancı University entered the Times Higher Education World University Rankings at the 182nd position, becoming the Turkish university with the highest rank upon its initial entry to the list. Moreover, it was the only private university in Turkey to be included in the rankings. In Spring 2016, Sabancı University ranked 10th worldwide in THE's list of small universities, those institutions with fewer than 5,000 students but that teach and research across more than four disciplines. Sabancı University also placed among the top 10,000 universities globally in the QS World University Rankings. In addition, the university was named the most innovative and entrepreneurial university in 2012 and 2016, and the most innovative foundation university in 2013 and 2014, in the Ministry of Science, Industry and Technology’s University Entrepreneurship and Innovation Index. In the 2025 Financial Times Business School Rankings, Sabancı Business School’s Executive MBA program ranked 48th globally.

Times Higher Education (THE) Rankings
| Year | In The World | Under 50 | In Asia | Small Universities |
|---|---|---|---|---|
| 2016 | 351-400 | 52 | - | 10 |
| 2015 | 182 | 13 | 21 | - |
| 2014 | - | - | - | - |

QS World University Rankings
| Year | World University | EECA |
|---|---|---|
| 2015/2016 | 441-450 | 14 |
| 2014/2015 | 471-480 | - |
| 2013/2014 | 501-550 | - |

== Research ==
RGP's organizational scope is extensive. It includes the Research Process Planning and Policy Development Office; Research Project Development Office; University-Industry Partnership and European Enterprise Network Istanbul; Research Project Management Office; Intellectual Property, Licensing and Contracts Office; Pre-Incubation and Accelerator Services Center; and Inovent A.Ş., the university's incubation center.

=== Research centers ===
The Sabancı University Integrated Manufacturing Technologies Research and Application Center (SU IMC) was founded in 2016. SU IMC is the industrial scale research and technology development center that provides laboratory test, prototype manufacturing, design and simulation services, composite materials in the scope of research and development services, and design, manufacturing, assembly and process prototyping services in the area of manufacturing technologies, also, provides consultancy and training services to governmental organizations and industry corporations.

SU IMC was built with an investment of $35 million to provide facilities for both fundamental and applied research, product development, graduate and life-long education. It also acts as a center for incubation services as well as commercialization opportunities in composite manufacturing technologies.

SU IMC targets to be a global bridge between academia and industry with its best practices of university-industry cooperation. The first university-industry cooperation was already established in composite technologies field with the collaboration of SU IMC and Kordsa, with the name of "Composite Technologies Center of Excellence" (CTCE) which has been a pioneer in Turkey with its business model and one of the leading development center of composite technologies in the world. SU IMC aims to establish other cooperations in the global area with industry players from variety of areas, notably aviation, defense, automotive, marine, energy, textile, sports&medical equipments.

The Sabancı University Nanotechnology Research and Application Center was founded with an initial investment of EUR 25 million provided by the State Planning Organization and Sabancı Foundation. Starting up operations in July 2011, the center's contributing team includes 40 faculty members, about 40 post-doctoral researchers, and hundreds of PhD students. Carrying out multidisciplinary advanced research efforts, the Center brings together researchers with expertise in advanced materials, basic sciences, and nanoengineering to develop applications for the electronics, photonics, healthcare, construction, environmental, agricultural and packaging industries.

Istanbul Policy Center (IPC) is a global policy research institution that focuses on key social and political issues, including democratization, climate change, transatlantic relations, and conflict resolution and mediation. IPC conducts its research under three main clusters: the Istanbul Policy Center Sabancı University Stiftung Mercator Initiative, Democratization and Institutional Reform, and Conflict Resolution and Mediation.

== Conference halls ==
- Sabancı Performing Arts Center
