= List of Turkish people =

This is a list of notable Turkish people, or the Turks, (Turkish: Türkler), who are an ethnic group primarily living in the Republic of Turkey and in the former lands of the Ottoman Empire where Turkish minorities have been established. They include people of Turkish descent born in other countries whose roots are in those countries. For Ottoman people see list of Ottoman people.

== Archaeologists ==
- Aslıhan Yener
- Hatice Gonnet-Bağana
- Halet Çambel
- Muhibbe Darga
- Nurettin Yardımcı
- Sedat Alp
- Selâhattin Kantar
- Tahsin Özgüç
- Tomris Bakır

== Art Gallerists ==
- Yahşi Baraz (born 1944)

== Authors ==
=== A–B ===
- Yunus Nadi Abalıoğlu
- Sait Faik Abasıyanık
- Halide Edib Adıvar
- Ahmet Ağaoğlu
- Süreyya Ağaoğlu
- Zeynep Ahunbay
- Yusuf Akçura
- Sunay Akın
- Muammer Aksoy
- Mustafa Akyol
- Alev Alatlı
- Sabahattin Ali
- Fikri Alican
- Ahmet Altan
- Çetin Altan
- İhsan Oktay Anar
- Melih Cevdet Anday
- Engin Ardıç
- Meltem Arıkan
- Ayşe Arman
- Cihat Arman
- Adem Yavuz Arslan
- Ömer Asan
- Duygu Asena
- Bülent Atalay
- Oğuz Atay
- İsmet Atlı
- Nihal Atsız
- Mustafa Balel
- Murat Bardakçı
- Can Bartu
- Enis Batur
- Sevtap Baycılı
- Ali Bayramoğlu
- Ataol Behramoğlu
- İlhan Berk
- Turgut Berkes
- İsmail Beşikçi
- Yahya Kemal Beyatlı
- Üstün Bilgen-Reinart
- Mehmed Emîn Bozarslan
- Rıza Tevfik Bölükbaşı

=== C–G ===
- Peride Celal
- Ahmet Hakan Coşkun
- Bekir Coşkun
- Necati Cumalı
- Ahmet Çakar
- Faruk Nafiz Çamlıbel
- Cengiz Çandar
- Hakan Çelik
- Muazzez İlmiye Çığ
- Emin Çölaşan
- Fazıl Hüsnü Dağlarca
- Can Dündar
- Bülent Ecevit
- Asli Erdogan
- Bikem Ekberzade
- Burak Eldem
- Haydar Ergülen
- Azra Erhat
- Mehmet Eroğlu
- Fahir Ersin
- Mehmet Akif Ersoy
- İclal Ersin
- Sabahattin Eyüboğlu
- Üzeyir Garih
- Reşat Nuri Güntekin
- Halil Gür
- Uğur Gürses
- Reşit Süreyya Gürsey

=== H–Q ===
- Ahmet Haşim
- Abdülhak Şinasi Hisar
- Ahmed Hulusi
- Rıfat Ilgaz
- Atilla İlhan
- Sabit Ince
- Abdi İpekçi
- İsmail Cem İpekçi
- Cevat Şakir Kabaağaçlı
- Metin Kaçan
- Sabri Kalic
- Orhan Veli Kanık
- Ceyhun Atuf Kansu
- Yakup Kadri Karaosmanoğlu
- Orhan Karaveli
- Yaşar Kemal
- Coşkun Kırca
- Necip Fazıl Kısakürek
- Ahmet Taner Kışlalı
- Ahmet Köklügiller
- Doğan Kuban
- Onat Kutlar
- Zülfü Livaneli
- Perihan Mağden
- Nasuh Mahruki
- Uğur Mumcu
- Murathan Mungan
- Nezihe Muhiddin
- Münejjim Bashi
- Behçet Necatigil
- Aziz Nesin
- Sevin Okyay
- Cumhur Oranci
- İpek Ongun
- Irfan Orga
- Altan Öymen
- Setenay Özbek
- İsmet Özel
- Ertuğrul Özkök
- İskender Pala
- Orhan Pamuk
- Lokman Polat

=== R–Z ===
- Peyami Safa
- Nejdet Sançar
- Aydilge Sarp
- Ali Riza Seyfi
- Ugur Soldan
- Cemal Süreya
- Elif Şafak
- Aşık Veysel Şatıroğlu
- Erman Şener
- Ferhan Şensoy
- Mahzuni Şerif
- Kemal Tahir
- Ahmet Hamdi Tanpınar
- Cahit Sıtkı Tarancı
- Abdülhak Hâmid Tarhan
- Latife Tekin
- Neyzen Tevfik
- Arzu Toker
- Metin Toker
- Said Nursî
- Osman Nuri Topbaş
- Hasan Ali Toptaş
- Fatma Aliye Topuz
- Hıfzı Topuz
- Cavit Orhan Tütengil
- Halit Ziya Uşaklıgil
- Serhat Ulueren
- Bilge Umar
- Recep Uslu
- Yekta Uzunoglu
- Bahriye Üçok
- Ümit Ünal
- Ahmet Vardar
- Sadık Yemni
- Mehmet Emin Yurdakul
- Can Yücel
- Feridun Zaimoğlu
- Ragıp Zarakolu
- Halide Nusret Zorlutuna
- Zafer Hanım
- Zülfü Livaneli

== Aviators ==
- Sabiha Gökçen (1913–2001)
- Vecihi Hürkuş (1895–1969)
- Irfan Orga (1908–1970)
- Ali İsmet Öztürk (born 1964)
- Murat Öztürk (aviator) (1953–2013)
- Nezihe Viranyalı (1925–2004)
- Ahmet Ali Çelikten (1883–1969)

== Beauty pageant contestants ==
- Azra Akın
- Günseli Başar
- Keriman Halis Ece
- Neşe Erberk
- Tuğçe Kazaz
- Çağla Kubat
- Nazlı Deniz Kuruoğlu
- Arzum Onan
- Leyla Lydia Tuğutlu
- Filiz Vural

== Business ==
- İshak Alaton
- Albert Jean Amateau
- Feyyaz Berker
- Serdar Bilgili
- Özhan Canaydın
- İlhan Cavcav
- Turgay Ciner
- Aydın Doğan
- Bülent Eczacıbaşı
- Nejat Eczacıbaşı
- Acun Ilıcalı
- Neşe Erberk
- Ahmet Ertegun
- Üzeyir Garih
- Işıtan Gün
- Sadi Gülçelik
- Rahmi Koç
- Vehbi Koç
- Ömer Koç
- Temel Kotil
- Koç family
- Asil Nadir
- Ahmet Mücahid Ören
- Enver Oren
- Sudi Özkan
- Hüsnü Özyeğin
- Ali Sabancı
- Güler Sabancı
- Hacı Sabancı
- Hacı Ömer Sabancı
- İhsan Sabancı
- Mehmet Sabancı
- Ömer Sabancı
- Özdemir Sabancı
- Sakıp Sabancı
- Sevil Sabancı
- Şevket Sabancı
- Demir Sabancı
- Kahraman Sadıkoğlu
- Ferit Şahenk
- Kemal Şahin
- Kenan Sahin
- Yener Sonusen
- Faruk Süren
- Yavuz Tatış
- Cem Uzan
- Ibrahim Uzel
- Alp Yalman
- Hacı Mehmet Zorlu

== By cities ==
=== Alanya ===
- List of governors of Alanya

=== Ankara ===
- Notable people from Ankara

=== Giresun ===
- List of mayors of Giresun

=== Istanbul ===
- List of notable people from Istanbul
- List of mayors of Istanbul
- List of governors of Istanbul

=== Izmir ===
- List of people from İzmir
- List of mayors of İzmir

=== Mersin ===
- List of mayors of Mersin
- Müfide İlhan
- Ahmet Kireççi
- Nevit Kodallı
- Macit Özcan
- Seyhan Kurt
- Nevin Yanıt
- Atıf Yılmaz

=== Zile ===
- List of mayors of Zile

== By country ==
=== Australia ===
- Tansel Başer
- İsyan Erdoğan
- John Eren
- Didem Erol
- Aytek Genç
- Ersan Gülüm
- John Ilhan
- Selin Kuralay
- Levent Osman
- Matthew Osman
- Tolgay Özbey
- Sedat Sir
- Adem Somyurek
- Nazlı Süleyman
- Ufuk Talay
- Ramazan Tavşancıoğlu
- Deniz Tek
- Ismail Tosun

=== Azerbaijan ===
- Ahmet Ağaoğlu
- Süreyya Ağaoğlu
- Rasim Başak
- Nuri Berköz
- Servet Çetin
- Haydar Hatemi
- Cem Karaca
- Sinan Şamil Sam
- Tamer Karadağlı

=== Bangladesh ===
- Noorul Quader

=== Bosnia and Herzegovina ===
- Cem Adrian
- Ayşegül Aldinç
- Ekrem Akurgal
- Nejat Biyediç
- Hüseyin Beşok
- Metin Boşnak
- Ömer Çatkıç
- Nedim Dal
- Ebru Destan
- Semih Erden
- Şebnem Ferah
- Almir Gegić
- Coşkun Göğen
- Sedat Kapanoğlu
- Hakan Köseoğlu
- Ayşe Kulin
- Süleyman Memnun
- Mehmet Okur
- Ajda Pekkan
- Saffet Sancaklı
- Kıvanç Tatlıtuğ
- Mirsad Türkcan
- Hidayet Türkoğlu
- Cem Uzan

=== Brazil ===
- Ibrahim Eris
- Luis Cetin
- Silvio Santos

=== Canada ===
- Üstün Bilgen-Reinart
- Selim Deringil
- Orhan Demir
- Enis Esmer
- Tuğba Karademir
- Nil Köksal
- Arda Ocal
- Semih Tezcan

=== Cuba ===
- Isaac Guillory

=== Cyprus ===
- Nej Adamson
- Nazim al-Qubrusi
- Ulus Baker
- Nil Burak
- Hussein Chalayan
- Alkan Çağlar
- Reşat Çağlar
- Murat Erdoğan
- Osman Ertuğ
- İsmet Güney
- Kemal İzzet
- Muzzy İzzet
- Işın Karaca
- Kıbrıslı Mehmed Emin Pasha
- Kıbrıslı Mehmed Kamil Pasha
- Asil Nadir
- Yılmaz Orhan
- Leon Osman
- Omer Riza
- Ziynet Sali
- Osman Türkay
- Vamık Volkan
- Fatima Whitbread
- Derviş Zaim

=== Denmark ===
- Yildiz Akdogan
- Hasan Al
- Yasin Avcı
- Saban Özdogan
- Yüsüf Öztürk
- Tülin Şahin, model and actress

=== Estonia ===
- Ant Nurhan

=== Finland ===
- Mehmet Gürs
- Ibrahim Köse
- Kaan Kairinen
- Melek Mazici
- Anton Odabasi
- Mert Otsamo
- Masar Ömer
- Teuvo Tulio
- Ozan Yanar

=== France ===
- Seyhan Kurt
- Cansel Elçin

=== Georgia ===
- Sofia Nizharadze

=== Hungary ===
- Erol Onaran
- Can Togay

=== Indonesia ===
- Zee Asadel
- Datuk Puduko Berhalo

=== Iraq ===
- İhsan Doğramacı
- Mehmet Ali Erbil
- Reha Muhtar
- Princess Fahrelnissa Zeid
- Mehmet Türkmehmet
- Ra'ad bin Zeid
- Prince Zeid bin Ra'ad

=== Ireland ===
- Billy Mehmet

=== Israel ===
- Pini Balili
- Umut Güzelses
- Meshulam Riklis
- Berry Sakharof

=== Italy ===
- Cem Sultan
- Abraham Salomon Camondo
- Leyla Gencer
- Mehmet Günsür
- Nicola Rossi-Lemeni
- Ferzan Özpetek
- Hugo Pratt

=== Jordan ===
- Muhanna Al-Dura

=== Kazakhstan ===
- Anjelika Akbar

=== Kosovo ===
- Soner Özbilen
- Ali Haydar Şen
- Güner Ureya

=== Kuwait ===
- Dina Al-Sabah

=== Latvia ===
- Samanta Tīna

=== Lebanon ===
- Bilal Aziz
- Ahmad Shukeiri

=== Libya ===
- Ahmed Karamanli
- Fathi Bashagha
- Muhammad Sakizli
- Fayez al-Sarraj

=== North Macedonia ===
- Tekin Arıburun
- Yahya Kemal Beyatlı
- Şebnem Ferah
- Srgjan Kerim
- Ali Fethi Okyar
- Yksel Osmanovski
- Sibel Redzep
- Esma Redžepova
- Tahsin Yazıcı

=== Malaysia ===
- Ungku Abdul Aziz
- Zeti Akhtar Aziz

=== Morocco ===
- Lalla Yacout Mother of king Mohammed V of Morocco
- Ali Bourequat
- Leïla Chellabi

=== Mexico ===
- Maya Jupiter

=== New Zealand ===
- Ayşe Tezel

=== Norway ===
- Azar Karadaş
- Vendela Kirsebom

=== Palestine ===
- Ekrem Akurgal

=== Pakistan ===
- Hassan Ali Effendi
- Asif Ali Zardari

=== Romania ===
- Mehmet Niyazi
- Murat Yusuf

=== South Africa ===
- Tatamkulu Afrika

=== Spain ===
- Irán Eory
- Isaac Guillory
- Victoria Kamhi

=== Sweden ===
- Kazım Ayvaz
- Serkan İnan
- Mehmet Kaplan
- Vendela Kirsebom
- Emin Nouri
- Yksel Osmanovski
- Sermin Özürküt
- Sibel Redzep
- Erkan Zengin

=== Syria ===
- Yusuf al-Azma

== By type ==
=== Precedence ===
- Turkish order of precedence

=== Assassinated people ===
- List of assassinated people from Turkey

=== Chiefs of MIT ===
- List of Chiefs of the MIT

=== Turks of net worth ===
- List of Turks by net worth

=== Governors of the Central Bank of Turkey ===
- List of Governors of the Central Bank of Turkey

== Cartoonists ==
- Bahadır Baruter
- Cemal Nadir Güler
- Cemil Cem
- Cem Kızıltuğ
- Cem Yılmaz
- Doğan Güzel
- Emre Özdemir
- Galip Tekin
- Gürbüz Doğan Ekşioğlu
- Ihap Hulusi Görey
- Mahmud A. Asrar
- M. K. Perker
- Oğuz Aral
- Onur Demirsoy
- Ramize Erer
- Salih Memecan
- Suat Yalaz
- Selma Emiroğlu
- Turhan Selçuk
- Ulaş Mangıtlı
- Yıldıray Çınar

== Centenarians ==
- Celal Bayar
- Ahmet Kayhan Dede
- Nilüfer Gürsoy

== Chefs ==
- CZN Burak
- Emel Başdoğan
- Hüseyin Özer
- Deniz Orhun
- Nusret Gökçe
- Kadir Nurman

== Doctors ==
- Fikri Alican
- Reşit Süreyya Gürsey
- Hulusi Behçet
- Münci Kalayoğlu
- Zeynel A. Karcioglu
- Behram Kurşunoğlu
- Serdar Nasır
- Sabuncuoğlu Şerafeddin
- Mehmet Oz
- Hasan Özbekhan
- Ömer Özkan
- Selahattin Özmen
- Mustafa Ülgen
- Şuayib Yalçın

== Educators ==
- Hasan Âli Yücel
- Haşim İşcan

== Entertainers ==
=== Comedians ===
- Kemal Sunal
- Ercan Yazgan
- Beyazıt Öztürk
- Cem Yılmaz
- Ata Demirer

=== Theatre directors ===
- Muhsin Ertuğrul
- Ferhan Şensoy

== Environmentalists ==
- Kemal Şahin

== Fashion designers ==
- Hussein Chalayan
- Rifat Özbek
- Erdem Moralioğlu

== Filmmakers ==
=== Film producers ===
- Ömer Lütfi Akad
- Tunç Başaran
- Sinan Çetin
- Zeki Demirkubuz
- Yılmaz Güney
- Türker İnanoğlu
- Sabri Kalic
- Semih Kaplanoğlu
- Onat Kutlar
- Tolga Örnek
- Ali Özgentürk
- Halit Refiğ
- Ece Soydam
- Mehmet Tanrısever
- Atıf Yılmaz

=== Film score composers ===
- Mazhar Alanson
- Fuat Güner
- Emir Işılay
- Gökhan Kırdar
- Erkan Oğur
- Ozan Çolakoğlu
- Özkan Uğur
- Zülfü Livaneli
- Melih Kibar

== Financiers ==
- Abraham Salomon Camondo
- Hüsnü Özyeğin
- Erol Sabancı
- Süreyya Serdengeçti
- Naim Talu
- Berç Türker Keresteciyan
- Durmuş Yılmaz

== Government and politics ==
- List of Turkish politicians
- List of presidents of Turkey
- List of prime ministers of Turkey
- List of Turkish diplomats
- List of ministers of foreign affairs of Turkey
- List of speakers of the Parliament of Turkey
- List of presidents of the Constitutional Court of Turkey

== Historians ==
- Abdülhak Adnan Adıvar
- Zeynep Ahunbay
- Sadri Maksudi Arsal
- Murat Bardakçı
- Halil Berktay
- Muazzez İlmiye Çığ (sumerologist)
- Selim Deringil
- Şemsettin Günaltay
- Ekmeleddin İhsanoğlu
- Halil İnalcık
- Afet İnan
- Kemal Karpat
- Reşat Ekrem Koçu
- Mehmet Fuat Köprülü
- Aydin Sayili
- Leyla Neyzi
- İlber Ortaylı
- Şevket Pamuk
- Hikmet Tanyu
- Zeki Velidi Togan
- Taner Akçam
- Nevra Necipoğlu

== Journalists ==
- Yunus Nadi Abalıoğlu
- Ahmet Ağaoğlu
- Sunay Akın
- Muammer Aksoy
- Mustafa Akyol
- Çetin Altan
- Fatih Altaylı
- Engin Ardıç
- Ayşe Arman
- Duygu Asena
- İsmet Atlı
- Murat Bardakçı
- Ali Cimen
- Bekir Coşkun
- Bikem Ekberzade
- Üstün Bilgen-Reinart
- Ahmet Çakar
- Cengiz Çandar
- Hakan Celik
- Emin Çölaşan
- Ahmet Hakan Coşkun
- Can Dündar
- Bülent Ecevit
- Burak Eldem
- Fahir Ersin
- Burhan Felek
- Uğur Gürses
- Hasan Tahsin
- Attilâ İlhan
- Balçiçek İlter
- Abdi İpekçi
- İsmail Cem İpekçi
- Yakup Kadri Karaosmanoğlu
- Namık Kemal
- Coşkun Kırca
- Ahmet Taner Kışlalı
- Halit Kıvanç
- Uğur Mumcu
- Altan Öymen
- Ertuğrul Özkök
- Erman Şener
- Hıfzı Topuz
- Şerif Turgut
- Cavit Orhan Tütengil
- Bahriye Üçok
- Serhat Ulueren
- Ahmet Vardar
- Ragıp Zarakolu

== Judges ==
- Lütfi Akadlı
- Zeki Akar
- Sünuhi Arsan
- Murat Arslan
- Osman Arslan
- Ahmet Hamdi Boyacıoğlu
- Mustafa Bumin
- Sumru Çörtoğlu
- Mahmut Cuhruk
- Necdet Darıcıoğlu
- Uğur İbrahimhakkıoğlu
- Hakkı Ketenoğlu
- Şevket Müftügil
- Nuri Ok
- Orhan Onar
- Mustafa Yücel Özbilgin
- Yekta Güngör Özden
- Semih Özmert
- İbrahim Senil
- Ahmet Necdet Sezer
- Osman Şirin
- Muhittin Taylan
- Tülay Tuğcu
- Kani Vrana
- Abdurrahman Yalçınkaya

== Lawyers ==
- Hicri Fişek
- Kemal Kerinçsiz
- Mehmet Ali Şahin
- Köksal Toptan
- Hayati Yazıcı

== Magicians ==
- Sermet Erkin
- Ertuğrul Işınbark
- İlkay Özdemir
- Zati Sungur

== Mathematicians ==
- Ali Akansu
- Selman Akbulut
- Cahit Arf
- Attila Aşkar
- Gelenbevi Ismail Efendi
- Feza Gürsey
- Halil Mete Soner
- Ayşe Soysal
- Tosun Terzioğlu
- 'Abd al-Hamīd ibn Turk
- Cem Yıldırım
- Yomtov Garti
- Ali Nesin
- Betül Tanbay

== Military ==
- List of chiefs of the Turkish General Staff
- List of commanders of the Turkish Land Forces
- List of commanders of the Turkish Air Force
- List of commanders of the Turkish Naval Forces
- List of general commanders of the Turkish Gendarmerie
- List of commandants of the Turkish Coast Guard
- List of commanders of the First Army of Turkey

== Models ==
- Azra Akın
- Deniz Akkaya
- Vildan Atasever
- Doğa Bekleriz
- Gülşen Bubikoğlu
- Itır Esen
- Gül Gölge
- Tuğçe Güder
- Burcin Orhon former spouse of Johnny Logan (singer)
- Yıldız Kaplan
- Aysun Kayacı
- Tuğçe Kazaz
- Çağla Kubat
- Manolya Onur
- Tuğba Özay
- Gamze Özçelik
- Jennifer Şebnem Schaefer
- Hale Soygazi
- Tuba Ünsal

== Musicologists ==
- Filiz Ali
- Emre Araci
- Rauf Yekta Bey
- Recep Uslu

== Music producers ==
- Haluk Kurosman
- Ozan Çolakoğlu
- Hasan Saltık

== Notable families ==
- Eczacıbaşı family
- Koç family
- Köprülü family
- Sabancı family

== Opera singers ==
- Esin Afşar
- Balık sisters
- Semiha Berksoy
- Bülent Bezdüz
- Burak Bilgili
- Leyla Gencer

== Painters ==
- List of Turkish painters
- List of Turkish Painters and artists

== Philanthropists ==
- Adile Sultan
- Nuri Demirağ
- Rahmi Koç
- Vehbi Koç
- Sakıp Sabancı
- Şevket Sabancı

== Photographers ==
- Ara Güler
- Ömer Asan
- Rahmizâde Bâhâeddin Bediz
- Bikem Ekberzade
- Burhan Doğançay
- İsmail Cem İpekçi
- Nasuh Mahruki
- Pascal Sebah
- Uğur Uluocak

== Physicists ==
- Bulent Atalay
- Nihat Berker
- Ordal Demokan
- Tekin Dereli
- Feza Gürsey
- Erdal İnönü
- Behram Kurşunoğlu
- Gökhan Okan
- Ekmel Ozbay
- Burçin Mutlu-Pakdil
- Turgay Uzer
- Ismail Akbay
- Atok Karaali-Karaali Rocks
- Dilhan Eryurt

== Pianists ==
- Fazıl Say
- İdil Biret
- Garo Mafyan
- Hüseyin Sermet
- Ferhan & Ferzan Önder
- Pekinel sisters
- Gülsin Onay

== Admirals ==
- Barbarossa Hayreddin Paşa
- Piri Reis
- Turgut Reis
- Piyale Paşa
- Kemal Reis
- Seydi Ali Reis
- Salih Reis
- Kurtoğlu Muslihiddin Reis
- Kurtoğlu Hızır Reis
- Uluç Ali Reis
- Tzachas

== Poets ==
=== Folk poets ===
- Muhlis Akarsu
- Nesimi Çimen
- Neşet Ertaş
- Aşık Veysel Şatıroğlu
- Aşık Mahzuni Şerif
- Zülfü Livaneli

== Record producers ==
- Ozan Çolakoğlu
- Ahmet Ertegun
- Nesuhi Ertegun
- Haluk Kurosman
- Arif Mardin
- Hasan Saltık

== Religious leaders ==
- Mustafa Çağrıcı
- Yaşar Nuri Öztürk
- Ali Bardakoğlu

=== Rabbis ===
- Aaron Abiob
- Aaron Alfandari
- Abraham ben Raphael Caro
- Yaakov Culi
- Menahem Egozi
- Ishak Haleva
- Joseph ibn Verga
- Aaron Lapapa
- Hayim Palaggi
- Judah Rosanes

== Royalty ==
- John Komnenos the Fat was a Byzantine noble

== Screenwriters ==
- Ömer Lütfi Akad
- Murat Aras
- Tunç Başaran
- Bilge Ebiri
- Türker İnanoğlu
- Semih Kaplanoğlu
- Levent Kazak
- Tuncel Kurtiz
- Onat Kutlar
- Ali Özgentürk
- Ferzan Özpetek
- Halit Refiğ
- Mehmet Tanrısever
- Ümit Ünal
- Atıf Yılmaz
- Cem Yılmaz
- Uğur Yücel

== Sportspeople ==
=== Athletes ===
- Halil Akkaş
- Mert Akturk
- Eşref Apak
- Süreyya Ayhan
- Birsen Bekgöz
- Ali Ferit Gören (1913–1987), Austrian-Turkish Olympic sprinter
- Özge Gürler
- Rıza Maksut İşman
- Ebru Kavaklıoğlu
- Ercüment Olgundeniz
- Pınar Saka
- Ruhi Sarıalp
- Mehmet Terzi
- Binnaz Uslu
- Nevin Yanıt

=== Racing drivers ===
- Can Artam
- Erkut Kızılırmak
- Hakan Dinç
- Jason Tahincioglu
- Mumtaz Tahincioglu
- Burcu Cetinkaya

=== Badminton ===
- Neslihan Arın
- Özge Bayrak
- Bengisu Erçetin
- Kader İnal
- Nazlıcan İnci
- Melih Turgut
- Emine Seçkin

=== Basketball coaches ===
- Barbaros Akkaş
- Serdar Apaydın
- Ergin Ataman
- Okan Çevik
- Hakan Demir
- Murat Didin
- Orhun Ene
- Harun Erdenay
- Yalçın Granit
- Zafer Kalaycıoğlu
- Erman Kunter
- Oktay Mahmuti
- Aydın Örs
- Murat Özyer
- Cenk Renda
- Ufuk Sarıca
- Ercüment Sunter
- Levent Topsakal
- Arda Vekiloğlu
- Emre Vatansever
- Ceyhun Yıldızoğlu

=== Basketball players ===
==== A–I ====
- Mustafa Abi
- Tutku Açık
- Can Akın
- Gülşah Akkaya
- Cenk Akyol
- Furkan Aldemir
- Hüseyin Alp
- Can Altıntığ
- Serdar Apaydın
- Ender Arslan
- Turgut Atakol FIBA Hall of Fame
- Ömer Aşık
- Engin Atsür
- Melike Bakırcıoğlu
- Doğuş Balbay
- Can Bartu
- Rasim Başak
- Birkan Batuk
- Emre Bayav
- Hüseyin Beşok
- Erdal Bibo
- Metecan Birsen
- Evren Büker
- Ömer Büyükaycan
- Hüsnü Çakırgil
- Arda Vekiloğlu
- Özhan Canaydın
- Berkay Candan
- Serhat Çetin
- Nedim Dal
- Begüm Dalgalar
- Turgay Demirel 4th President of FIBA Europe
- Hakan Demirel
- İpek Derici
- Kemal Dinçer
- Şafak Edge
- Selin Ekiz
- Orhun Ene
- Korel Engin
- Burcu Erbaş
- Semih Erden
- Harun Erdenay
- Serkan Erdoğan
- Barış Ermiş
- Erbil Eroğlu
- Tufan Ersöz
- Murat Evliyaoğlu
- Duygu Fırat
- Samet Geyik
- Kerem Gönlüm
- Zeki Gülay
- Muratcan Güler
- Sinan Güler
- Barış Hersek
- Yasemin Horasan
- Ersan İlyasova
- Serkan İnan
- Tuğçe İnöntepe
- Şaziye İvegin-Karslı

==== J–Z ====
- Zafer Kalaycıoğlu
- Enes Kanter
- İlkan Karaman
- Ali Karadeniz
- Aysu Keskin
- Deniz Kılıçlı
- Şebnem Kimyacıoğlu
- Yasemin Kimyacıoğlu
- İnanç Koç
- Can Korkmaz
- Göksenin Köksal
- Ermal Kurtoğlu
- İbrahim Kutluay
- Tuğçe Murat
- Can Maxim Mutaf
- Cemal Nalga
- Mehmet Okur
- Ömer Onan
- Adem Ören
- Aydın Örs
- Kartal Özmızrak
- Cedi Osman
- Tamer Oyguç
- Cevher Özer
- Aytaç Özkul
- Arzu Özyiğit
- Bora Hun Paçun
- Kaya Peker
- Nalan Ramazanoğlu
- Cenk Renda
- Alperen Şengün
- Ceren Sarper
- Alper Saruhan
- Oğuz Savaş
- Kenan Sipahi
- Arın Soğancıoğlu
- Fatih Solak
- Ümit Sonkol
- Sertaç Şanlı
- Caner Topaloğlu
- Levent Topsakal
- Kerem Tunçeri
- Esmeral Tunçluer
- Mirsad Türkcan
- Hidayet Türkoğlu
- İzzet Türkyılmaz
- Henry Turner
- Berk Uğurlu
- Birsel Vardarlı
- Erkan Veyseloğlu
- Mehmet Yağmur
- Meriç Banu Yenal
- Nilay Yiğit
- Haluk Yıldırım
- Aylin Yıldızoğlu
- Alper Yılmaz
- Nevriye Yılmaz
- Nedim Yücel
- Serap Yücesir
- Müjde Yüksel

=== Carom billiards players ===
- Gülşen Degener
- Semih Saygıner

=== Bodybuilders ===
- Ahmet Enünlü
- Cemal Erçman

=== Boxers ===
- Serdar Avcı
- Selçuk Aydın
- Turgut Aykaç
- Malik Beyleroğlu
- Eyüp Can
- Buse Naz Çakıroğlu
- Orhan Delibaş
- Şennur Demir
- Ertuğrul Ergezen
- Yakup Kılıç
- Adem Kılıççı
- Abdülkadir Koçak
- Ramaz Paliani
- Sinan Şamil Sam
- Onder Sipal
- Nurhan Süleymanoğlu
- Busenaz Sürmeneli
- Gülsüm Tatar
- Oktay Urkal
- Atagün Yalçınkaya

=== Chess players ===
- Suat Atalık
- Tunç Hamarat
- Ferhat Karmil

=== Fencers ===
- İrem Karamete (born 1993), Olympic fencer

=== Field hockey ===
- Timur Oruz
- Selin Oruz

=== Football managers ===
==== A–M ====
- Erdoğan Arıca
- Cihat Arman
- Abdullah Avcı
- Samet Aybaba
- Eşfak Aykaç
- Giray Bulak
- Rıza Çalımbay
- Oğuz Çetin
- Raşit Çetiner
- Mustafa Denizli
- Rıdvan Dilmen
- Ziya Doğan
- Bülent Eken
- Muhsin Ertuğral
- Fuat Çapa
- Şenol Güneş
- Ömer Kaner
- Rasim Kara
- Hikmet Karaman
- Ünal Karaman
- Suat Kaya
- Erdal Keser
- Gündüz Kılıç
- Aykut Kocaman
- Bülent Korkmaz
- Güvenç Kurtar
- Cemşir Muratoğlu

==== N–Z ====
- Coşkun Özarı
- Arkoç Özcan
- Yasin Özdenak
- Ertuğrul Sağlam
- Nurullah Sağlam
- Tugay Semercioğlu
- Naci Şensoy
- Turgay Şeren
- Adnan Suvari
- Metin Tekin
- Hurser Tekinoktay
- Fatih Terim
- Tınaz Tırpan
- Metin Türel
- Ümit Turmuş
- Serpil Hamdi Tüzün
- Feyyaz Uçar
- Turgut Uçar
- Telat Üzüm
- Yılmaz Vural
- Murat Yakın
- Fuat Yaman
- Ersun Yanal
- Ali Sami Yen
- Hakkı Yeten
- Tayfur Havutçu
- Fevzi Zemzem

=== Footballers ===
==== A ====
- Olcan Adın
- Aytaç Ak
- Orhan Ak
- Muhammed Akagündüz
- Bülent Akın
- İbrahim Akın
- Serhat Akın
- Fırat Akkoyun
- Ayhan Akman
- Birol Aksancak
- Altan Aksoy
- Cafercan Aksu
- Emre Aktaş
- Metin Aktaş
- Ercan Aktuna
- Fatih Akyel
- Murat Akyüz
- Mehmet Akyüz
- Erhan Albayrak
- Adem Alkaşi
- Ünal Alpuğan
- Halil Altıntop
- Hamit Altıntop
- Yusuf Altuntaş
- Ogün Altıparmak
- Erdoğan Arıca
- Hakan Arıkan
- Cihat Arman
- Volkan Arslan
- Kemal Aslan
- Metin Aslan
- Emre Aşık
- Çağdaş Atan
- Necati Ateş
- Yasin Avcı
- Koray Avcı
- İbrahim Aydemir
- Erhan Aydın
- Necat Aygün
- Devran Ayhan
- Yalçın Ayhan
- Eşfak Aykaç
- Serkan Aykut
- Gündüz Gürol Azer

==== B–C ====
- Volkan Babacan
- Ediz Bahtiyaroğlu
- Alper Balaban
- Serkan Balcı
- Hakan Balta
- Deniz Barış
- Can Bartu
- Yıldıray Baştürk
- Özgür Bayer
- Deniz Baykara
- Sedat Bayrak
- Hakan Bayraktar
- Emre Belözoğlu
- Ferhat Bıkmaz
- Recep Biler
- Ali Bilgin
- Coşkun Birdal
- Zafer Biryol
- Bülent Bölükbaşı
- Uğur Boral
- Mehmet Budak
- Erol Bulut
- Umut Bulut
- Okan Buruk
- Adem Büyük
- Musa Büyük
- Mehmet Çakır
- Yasin Çakmak
- Serkan Çalik
- Oğuz Çalışkan
- Cihan Can
- Ömer Çatkıç
- Yasin Çelik
- Oğuz Çetin
- Recep Çetin
- Servet Çetin
- Mustafa Cevahir
- Orhan Çıkırıkçı
- Daniyel Cimen
- Hüseyin Çimşir
- Ferhat Çökmüş
- Tanju Çolak
- Tayfun Çora
- Olgay Coskun
- Bilal Çubukçu

==== D–E ====
- Ekrem Dağ
- Oğuz Dağlaroğlu
- Ilie Datcu
- Ümit Davala
- Aykut Demir
- Cem Demir
- Taner Demirbaş
- Volkan Demirel
- Serol Demirhan
- Christian Demirtas
- Mustafa Denizli
- Abdurrahman Dereli
- Oktay Derelioğlu
- Rıdvan Dilmen
- Basri Dirimlili
- Deniz Doğan
- Hüzeyfe Doğan
- Ziya Doğan
- Osman Kürşat Duman
- Adem Dursun
- Ahmet Dursun
- Murat Duruer
- Kürşat Duymuş
- Ibrahim Ege
- Bülent Eken
- Ferdi Elmas
- Fevzi Elmas
- Alpaslan Eratlı
- Abdullah Ercan
- Aykut Erçetin
- Arif Erdem
- Mülayim Erdem
- Naci Erdem
- Evren Erdeniz
- Mevlüt Erdinç
- Mert Erdoğan
- Murat Erdoğan
- Mahmut Hanefi Erdoğdu
- Emrah Eren
- Ceyhun Eriş
- Adnan Erkan
- Caner Erkin
- Rober Eryol

==== F–J ====
- Berkant Göktan
- Gökhan Gönül
- Şanver Göymen
- Hürriyet Güçer
- Arda Güler
- Şükrü Gülesin
- Ceyhun Gülselam
- Ali Güneş
- Şenol Güneş
- Serdar Güneş
- Emre Güngör
- Gürhan Gürsoy
- Mehmet Güven
- Emrullah Güvenç
- Serdal Güvenç
- Sercan Güvenışık
- Umut Güzelses
- Murat Hacıoğlu
- Hamza Hamzaoğlu
- Şeref Has
- Tayfur Havutçu
- Topuz Hikmet
- Hakkı Hocaoğlu
- Özer Hurmacı
- Efe İnanç
- Vedat İnceefe
- Uğur İnceman
- Engin İpekoğlu
- Bekir İrtegün
- Cenk İşler
- Kemal İzzet
- Muzzy İzzet

==== K–L ====
- Hasan Kabze
- Tolunay Kafkas
- İlyas Kahraman
- Nihat Kahveci
- Sinan Kaloğlu
- Ömer Kaner
- Jem Karacan
- Azar Karadaş
- Batuhan Karadeniz
- Gökdeniz Karadeniz
- Burak Karaduman
- Anıl Karaer
- Ümit Karan
- Arif Karaoğlan
- Levent Kartop
- Veli Kavlak
- Uğur Kavuk
- Onur Kaya
- Suat Kaya
- Colin Kazim-Richards
- Tugay Kerimoğlu
- Erdal Keser
- Mustafa Keçeli
- Gündüz Kılıç
- Zafer Kılıçkan
- Serkan Kırıntılı
- Bilal Kısa
- Mehmet Sarper Kiskaç
- Ferhat Kıskanç
- Okan Koç
- Adem Koçak
- Celaleddin Koçak
- Aykut Kocaman
- Ender Konca
- Egemen Korkmaz
- Mert Korkmaz
- Tayfun Korkut
- Tevfik Köse
- Serdar Kulbilge
- Ramazan Kurşunlu
- Serdar Kurtuluş
- Ahmet Kuru
- Uğur Arslan Kuru
- Erhan Kuşkapan
- Hakan Kutlu

==== M–Q ====
- Hami Mandıralı
- İlhan Mansız
- Baki Mercimek
- Tümer Metin
- Murat Ocak
- Metin Oktay
- Ali Ölmez
- Özden Öngün
- Alpay Özalan
- Coşkun Özarı
- Ümit Özat
- Barış Özbek
- Arkoç Özcan
- Özgürcan Özcan
- Mehmet Özdilek
- Kenan Özer
- Zafer Özgültekın
- Nesim Özgür
- Mesut Özil
- Mustafa Özkan
- Serdar Özkan
- Osman Özköylü
- Serkan Özsoy
- Ferhat Öztorun
- Okan Öztürk
- Sezer Öztürk
- Yüsüf Öztürk
- Emre Öztürk
- Cem Pamiroğlu
- İlhan Parlak
- Ergün Penbe
- Necmi Perekli

==== R–T ====
- Rüştü Reçber
- Omer Riza
- Oğuz Sabankay
- Ertuğrul Sağlam
- Mahir Sağlık
- Selçuk Şahin
- Zafer Şakar
- Saffet Sancaklı
- Tuncay
- Burhan Sargın
- Adem Sarı
- Sabri Sarıoğlu
- Yüksel Sariyar
- Hasan Şaş
- Halil Savran
- Mehmet Scholl
- Mehmet Sedef
- Turgay Semercioğlu
- Ziya Şengül
- Semih Şentürk
- Mehmet Kutay Şenyıl
- Ömer Sepici
- Turgay Şeren
- Tayfun Seven
- Tolga Seyhan
- Suleyman Sleyman
- Fatih Sonkaya
- Yusuf Soysal
- Zeki Rıza Sporel
- Hakan Şükür
- Elyasa Süme
- Feridun Sungur
- Ali Tandoğan
- Kaya Tarakçı
- Anıl Taşdemir
- Fahri Tatan
- Metin Tekin
- Fatih Tekke
- Ogün Temizkanoğlu
- Fatih Terim
- Mehmet Topal
- Mehmet Topuz
- İbrahim Toraman
- Murat Tosun
- Ramazan Tunç
- Fevzi Tuncay
- Onur Tuncer
- Önder Turacı
- Arda Turan
- Cemil Turan
- Suat Türker
- Uğur Tütüneker

==== U–Z ====
- Feyyaz Uçar
- Uğur Uçar
- Hasan Üçüncü
- Gökhan Ünal
- Cengiz Ünder
- Volkan Ünlü
- Hakan Ünsal
- Orkun Usak
- Suat Usta
- Engin Verel
- Aytekin Viduşlu
- Wederson
- Lev Yalcin
- Sergen Yalçın
- Volkan Yaman
- Erdinç Yavuz
- Zafer Yelen
- Sedat Yeşilkaya
- Hakkı Yeten
- Müjdat Yetkiner
- Faruk Yiğit
- Mehmet Yıldız (footballer)
- Yıldo
- Aydın Yılmaz
- Burak Yılmaz
- Deniz Yilmaz
- Mehmet Yılmaz (striker)
- Mehmet Yılmaz (defender)
- Okan Yılmaz
- Özgür Yılmaz
- Hüseyin Yoğurtçu
- Muhammet Hanifi Yoldaş
- Mehmet Yozgatlı
- Can Emre Yücel
- Selçuk Yula
- Rahim Zafer
- Gökhan Zan
- Fevzi Zemzem
- Kerim Zengin
- Tolga Zengin

=== Gymnasts ===
- Ferhat Arıcan
- İbrahim Çolak (gymnast)
- Duygu Doğan
- Göksu Üçtaş Şanlı
- Ümit Şamiloğlu
- Ayşe Begüm Onbaşı
- Dilara Yurtdaş
- Ahmet Önder

=== Martial artists ===
==== Judoka ====
- Salim Abanoz
- Derya Cıbır
- Bektaş Demirel
- Sezer Huysuz
- Belkıs Zehra Kaya
- Gülşah Kocatürk
- Cemal Oğuz
- Hüseyin Özkan
- Hülya Şenyurt
- Selim Tataroğlu
- Irfan Toker
- Iraklı Uznadze
- Özgür Yılmaz

==== Karateka ====
- Haldun Alagaş
- Ugur Aktas (karateka)
- Yıldız Aras
- Merve Coban
- Gülderen Çelik
- Ömer Kemaloğlu
- Tuba Yakan
- Serap Özçelik

==== Kickboxers ====
- Erhan Deniz
- Murat Direkçi
- Yeliz Fındık
- Gülşah Kıyak
- Asiye Özlem Şahin
- Hülya Şahin
- Gökhan Saki
- Şahin Yakut

==== Mixed martial artists ====
- Gökhan Saki
- Alptekin Özkiliç

==== Muay Thai practitioners ====
- Ayşegül Behlivan
- Yeliz Fındık
- Nurhayat Hiçyakmazer

==== Taekwondo practitioners ====
- Yeliz Fındık
- Azize Tanrıkulu
- Bahri Tanrıkulu
- Nur Tatar
- Servet Tazegül
- Çetin Topçuoğlu
- Hamide Bıkçın Tosun

==== Wushu practitioners ====
- Ayşegül Behlivan
- Lehize Hilal Benli
- Hüseyin Dündar
- Yeliz Fındık
- Nurhayat Hiçyakmazer
- Gülşah Kıyak
- Öznur Kızıl

=== Motorcycle racers ===
- Toprak Razgatlıoğlu
- Bahattin Sofuoğlu
- Kenan Sofuoğlu
- Sinan Sofuoğlu
- Can Öncü

=== Mountain climbers ===
- Nasuh Mahruki
- Tunç Fındık
- Eylem Elif Maviş
- Burçak Özoğlu Poçan
- Serhan Poçan
- Uğur Uluocak

=== Olympic competitors for Turkey ===
- Eşref Apak
- Sedat Artuç
- Süreyya Ayhan
- Ahmet Ayık
- Kelime Aydın
- Selçuk Aydın
- Kazım Ayvaz
- Mithat Bayrak
- Derya Büyükuncu
- Mustafa Dağıstanlı
- Bektaş Demirel
- Mete Gazoz
- Rıza Maksut İşman
- Ebru Kavaklıoğlu
- Halil Mutlu
- Sebahattin Oglago
- Ruhi Sarıalp
- Naim Süleymanoğlu
- Şule Şahbaz
- Uğur Taner
- Selim Tataroğlu
- Nurcan Taylan
- Hamide Bıkçın Tosun
- Duygu Ulusoy
- Iraklı Uznadze
- Atagün Yalçınkaya

=== Swimmers ===
- Derya Büyükuncu
- Emre Sakçı
- Bengisu Avcı
- Uğur Taner
- Kuzey Tunçelli

=== Tennis players ===
- Çağla Büyükakçay
- Marsel İlhan
- Pemra Özgen
- Melis Sezer
- İpek Soylu
- İpek Şenoğlu

=== Volleyball players ===
- Çağla Akın
- Kübra Akman
- Naz Aydemir Akyol
- Hande Baladın
- Emre Batur
- Neslihan Demir
- Alperay Demirciler
- Eda Erdem
- Gizem Güreşen
- Ebrar Karakurt
- Buse Kayacan
- Resul Tekeli
- Murat Yenipazar
- Halil İbrahim Yücel
- Özge Yurtdagülen
- Güldeniz Önal
- Gizem Örge
- Özlem Özçelik
- Neriman Özsoy

=== Wrestlers ===
- Nasuh Akar
- Mahmut Atalay
- Celal Atik
- Taha Akgül
- İsmet Atlı
- Ahmet Ayık
- Kazım Ayvaz
- Mithat Bayrak
- Ahmet Bilek
- Gazanfer Bilge
- Nuri Boytorun
- Mehmet Çoban
- Mustafa Dağıstanlı
- Mahmut Demir
- Yaşar Doğu
- Vehbi Emre
- Yaşar Erkan
- Şeref Eroğlu
- Hasan Gemici
- Hasan Güngör
- Riza Kayaalp
- Hamit Kaplan
- Ahmet Kireççi
- Tevfik Kış
- Kurtdereli Mehmet Pehlivan
- İsmail Ogan
- Mehmet Oktav
- Mehmet Özal
- Mehmet Akif Pirim
- Müzahir Sille
- Bayram Şit
- Tayyar Yalaz
- Hamza Yerlikaya

== Sculptors ==
- Mehmet Aksoy (sculptor)
- Tankut Öktem
- Sevgi Çağal
- Kamil Sonad
- kenan Yontunç

== Songwriters ==
- Barış Manço
- Cem Adrian
- Sezen Aksu
- Mazhar Alanson
- Aslı
- Aydilge
- Emre Aydın
- Yavuz Bingöl
- Kenan Doğulu
- Feridun Düzağaç
- Sertab Erener
- Şebnem Ferah
- Orhan Gencebay
- Nil Karaibrahimgil
- Kayahan
- Kıraç
- Kâzım Koyuncu
- Burak Kut
- Zülfü Livaneli
- Zeki Müren
- Nazan Öncel
- Serdar Ortaç
- Bülent Ortaçgil
- Tarkan
- Ferdi Tayfur
- Özlem Tekin
- Hande Yener
- Levent Yüksel

== Television personalities ==
- Okan Bayülgen
- Hakan Celik
- Arda Öcal
- Deniz Orhun

== Television presenters ==
- Ali İhsan Varol
- Deniz Orhun
- Mehmet Ali Birand
- Okan Bayülgen
- Reha Muhtar
- Şebnem Dönmez
- Uğur Dündar
- Zeynep Tokuş

== Others ==
- Ridvan Aydemir, ex-Muslim activist, YouTuber
- Bajkam, military commander
- Sadun Boro, sailor and global circumnavigator
- Ahmet the Calligrapher, saint
- Hasan Çelebi, calligrapher
- Araksi Çetinyan, Turkish beauty pageant winner
- Emir Cemal, Turkish youtuber
- Nejat Eczacıbaşı, pharmaceutical entrepreneur
- Hadi Elazzi, talent manager
- İlhan Erdost, publisher
- Erden Eruç, completed first solo human-powered circumnavigation of the Earth by rowboat, sea kayak, bicycle and foot
- Kara Fatma, female hero
- Ghias ad-Din, was a member of the Seljuq dynasty of Rum
- Cem Karsan, volatility expert, hedge fund manager, social media personality
- Levent Kazak, scriptwriter
- Nasuh Mahruki, first Turkish summiteer of Mt. Everest
- Janet Akyüz Mattei, astronomer
- Mehmet Baybaşin, drug trafficker
- Mehmet Ali Arslan, Newspaper Writer publisher
- Tatikios (c. 1048 - died after 1110), Byzantine general
- Neyzen Tevfik, neyzen

== See also ==
- List of Turkish Armenians
- List of Turkish scientists
- List of assassinated people from Turkey
- List of French Turks
- List of governors of the Central Bank of the Republic of Turkey
- List of first ladies of Turkey
- List of ministers of national defense of Turkey
- List of ministers of national education of Turkey
- List of Turkish billionaires by net worth
- List of contemporary Turkish poets
- List of presidents of the Constitutional Court of Turkey
- Turkish women in sports
