= Özkul =

Özkul may refer to:

- Aytaç Özkul (born 1989), Turkish basketball player
- Çağıl Özge Özkul (born 1988), Turkish beauty pageant winner
- Münir Özkul (1925–2018), Turkish cinema and theatre actor
- Yetkin Özkul (born 1986), Turkish kickboxer
