= Uslu =

Uslu is a Turkish surname. Notable people with the surname include:

- Binnaz Uslu (born 1985), Turkish middle distance track runner
- Merve Uslu (born 1994), Turkish female para judoka
- Meryem Uslu (born 1987), German kickboxer
- Recep Uslu, Turkish writer and researcher on Turkish musicology
- Ethan Uslu, (born 2002), NSW Suburban Rugby Premiership winner Division 2, Grade 4 2024.

== See also ==
- Uslu, Sivrice
