= Tayfun =

Tayfun is a Turkish name and may refer to:

- Tayfun Aydoğan (born 1996), Turkish footballer
- Tayfun Bademsoy (born 1958), Turkish-German actor
- Tayfun Cora (born 1983), Turkish footballer
- Tayfun Korkut (born 1974), Turkish footballer
- Tayfun Pektürk (born 1988), German footballer
- Tayfun Rıdvan Albayrak (born 1980), Turkish footballer
- Tayfun Seven (born 1980), Turkish footballer
- Tayfun Taşdemir (born 1975), Turkish professional carom billiards player
- Tayfun Türkmen (born 1978), Turkish footballer
- Tayfun Uzbay (born 1959), Turkish scientist
