= Uğur Soldan =

Turkish author, critic, academic and lecturer (born 1978)

Ugur Soldan (born 1978) is a Turkish author, critic, academic and lecturer.

He was born in Mut, a town of the province Mersin in Turkey, in 1978. After graduating from primary school in Hocalı, the village where he was born and spent his childhood years, Ugur Soldan completed his secondary and high school education at Mersin Dumlupınar Lyceum. He received his bachelor's degree from the department of Turkish Language and Literature in the faculty of Science and Literature at Yüzüncü Yıl University in 2003, and his master's degree from the department of Turkish Language and Literature in the Social Sciences Institution at Gaziantep University in 2005. As of November 2006, he is a full-time lecturer in the department of Turcology in the faculty of Administration at Economics and Enterprise University in Jalal-Abad, Kyrgyzstan.

Soldan's first essay was published in Pınar Magazine when he was a high school student. He published and worked as the editor of Gün Batımı Magazine in Muğla in 1998. He compiled his first stories under the title of Gözlerden Irak, and published the book in 1999. His essays, studies and critiques were published in the Turkish literary magazines such as Türk Edebiyatı, Yedi İklim, Dergâh, Virgül and Kaşgar. His second book Şiirin Aynasındaki Simurg Hilmi Yavuz'un Hayatı Estetiği ve Şiir Dünyası ('Simurgh in the Mirror of Poetry: the Life, Esthetics and Poetry World of Hilmi Yavuz’) was published by Can Publishers in 2003, and third book (co-authored by Prof. Dr. Muhsin Macit), Edebiyat Bilgi ve Teorileri ('Literature Information and Theories') was published by Grafiker Publishers in 2004.

He has been working in the University of Manas as a lecturer since 2007.
