= Ahmet Vardar =

Turkish journalist and television presenter

- Born: 1937; Istanbul, Turkey
- Died: February 25, 2010 (aged 73); Istanbul
- Occupations: Journalist, columnist and TV presenter

Ahmet Vardar (1937 – 25 February 2010) was a notable Turkish journalist and television presenter.

== Biography ==
Vardar was born 1937 in Istanbul. He worked for many newspapers, the longest for the daily Sabah. He served for many years as the general manager of Sabah News Agency. Vardar worked as a journalist for some fifty odd years. Though at first a sports reporter, and a legal correspondent, he later did work on the news management side at Günaydın, Tan, Zaman, Sabah and Vatan. He was well known for his hard work and honesty by most of the journalists in Turkey.

There were rumors that he would be going back to work for Sabah with his Alo Sabah column after the Sabah administration changed many times.

== Career ==
He worked in several newspapers like Gunaydin, Tan, Sabah and Zaman. In the 1990s, he made a television program called "Ahmet Vardar Soruyor" (English: Ahmet Vardar Inquiring). He was a daily columnist in the Turkish newspaper Vatan until he wrote his last article dated 5 March 2006. Vardar often yelled at people, who committed crimes. His famous quote is "patlatirim enseni", which means "I'm gonna blow your neck".

Levent Kırca impersonated him very well in his comedy show Olacak O kadar.

== Death ==
Ahmet Vardar kept writing his column until he was diagnosed with pancreatic cancer in November 2009, according to the NTV news web site. He died on 25 February 2010 in a hospital in Istanbul at the age of 73.
