= Deniz Orhun =

Turkish chef and agricultural engineer

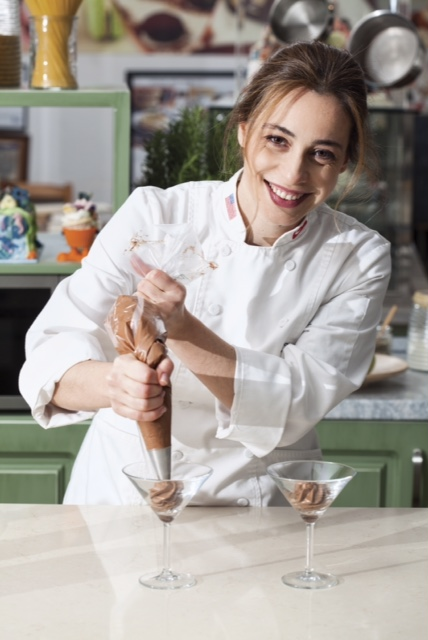
- Born: 1974 (age 51–52); Ankara, Turkey
- Occupations: chef, engineer, media personality, businesswoman
- Years active: 2006 - present
- Website: www.denizorhun.com

Deniz Orhun (born 1974) is a chef, agricultural engineer, media personality, and businesswoman.

== Education and Career ==
Chef Deniz graduated from Ankara University-Department of Agriculture Engineering, she completed her MBA Master's degree at London College and Hacettepe University.

She worked at Merck Sharp & Dohme, at Novartis and at Tetra Pak for various missions in Sweden, Dubai and Brazil.

She then went to the US and studied Baking and Pastry at Kendall College National Louis University which is known as the “Harvard of the culinary world”. She worked at Swedish Bakery, Union League and Four Seasons Chicago. She represented Turkey during the International Cuisine Festival and won a first prize.

Chef Deniz is owner and founder of Klemantin since 2008. She has gained success through a variety of business ventures.

== Television shows ==
Year	Title	Production	Channel
2015 - 2016	Pastane	Klemantin Production	TRT 1 200 -Episodes
2013 - 2015	Deniz'den Mutfak Hikayeleri	Klemantin Production	Al Jazeera Cine 5 530 -Episodes
2014 - 2015	Ramazan Sofrası	Klemantin Production	TRT Türk-Haber
2014 - 2015	Annem Söyler Ben Yaparım	TRT	TRT 1 80 -Episodes
2016	Deniz'le Ramazan Mutfağı	Klemantin Production	Tivibu 30 Episodes

== Publications ==
Deniz has authored these publications:

- Yedikleriniz Davranışlarınız Olur (What You Eat Affects How You Behave), 2019, ISBN 978-6058259287
- Gastrotourism According To The 24 Solar Terms Regimen, 2020 Springer Nature Book, Heritage Tourism Beyond Borders and Civilisations, ISBN 978-9811553691

== Awards ==
- 2007:Best Chef / International Cuisine Festival

== Personal life ==
Deniz Orhun is married. She speaks Turkish and English.
