= Ferhat Karmil =

Georgian chess composer (born 1958)

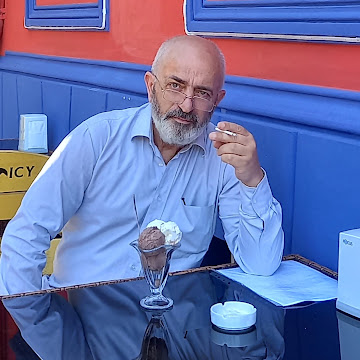
- Ferhat Karmil in 2023
- Born: October 3, 1958 (age 68); Ureki, Georgia
- Citizenship: Georgia
- Occupations: Chess composer, independent researcher
- Website: www.chessstar.com

Ferhat Karmil is a chess composer, formerly representing the Soviet Union, Georgia, and Turkey. Since 2025 he has been active as an independent author, not associated with any particular country.

He is the founder and editor of the independent online platform ChessStar.com.

Karmil was awarded the title of FIDE Master for Chess Composition in 2014, and the title of International Judge of the WFCC in 2021.

As of 2024, he is the author of 25 selected compositions included in the FIDE Album.

== Biography ==
Ferhat Karmil is of Turkish nationality and professes Islam.

His father was Rasim Karmil, and his mother was Fazilet Kakabadze (née Djevdet-zade), the daughter of the Turkologist, linguist, and literary scholar Hikmet Djevdet-zade. In 1944, the family was deported from the Georgian SSR to the Kyrgyz SSR, settling in the city of Kyzyl-Kiya.

In the second half of the 1950s, they returned to Georgia; however, in 1960, due to increasing administrative pressure and unfavorable living conditions, the family was forced to leave Georgia and resettle again in the Kyrgyz SSR. In 1966, Karmil began his studies at Secondary School No. 3 named after A. P. Chekhov. In 1967, the family returned to Georgia, where he continued his education at Secondary School No. 8 named after V. G. Belinsky in Batumi.

After graduating from school in 1976, he entered the Georgian Polytechnic Institute, where he studied mechanical engineering of machine tools and instruments. From 1983 to 1985, he served in the Soviet Armed Forces in a training tank regiment in the city of Vladimir.

Since 2009, Karmil has also been writing rubaiyat poetry.

== Continuum Theory, the Stream System, and SAS ==
Since 2025, Karmil has conducted independent research on Continuum Theory, the Stream System, and their applications to the analysis of musical structures.

In Karmil's formulation, Continuum Theory treats space and time as distinguishable but inseparable attributes of the Continuum, related through an intrinsic coupling. This differs from approaches in which space and time are treated as independent entities, separate dimensions, or externally combined components of a geometric framework.

The Stream System describes directed processes in terms of ascending and descending streams. It was initially applied to the study of musical structures, including diatonic systems, modal relations, symmetry, and transitions between different stream states.

Karmil also developed SAS, a software system intended for the computational analysis and classification of musical, audio, and video materials using parameters and models derived from the Stream System. Project descriptions, software materials, and examples of application have been made publicly available.

== Chess composition ==
Since 1986, Karmil has published more than 260 chess problems, and is a multiple prize-winner in international composition tournaments. His greatest successes have been achieved in the genre of moremover logical problems.

He has served as a judge in a number of international tournaments in the genres of three-movers and moremovers, and is the author of articles on chess composition. He has also organized annual international tournaments, including the miniature competition MiniStar, held on ChessStar.com.

Karmil is also the creator and administrator of the “Chess Star” group on Facebook, a community dedicated to publishing materials related to chess composition.

In 2013, Karmil (unofficially) represented Turkey at the 56th World Congress of Chess Composition in Batumi.

In 2018, he served as director of the composing tournament at the 43rd Chess Olympiad in Batumi.

Karmil was the silver medalist of the 10th FIDE World Cup in Composing in 2022, and the winner of the 11th FIDE World Cup in Composing in 2023 in the moremovers section.

Karmil specializes in two main genres of chess composition: logical moremovers, which involve a sequence of precise moves leading to checkmate, and orthodox miniatures, which are composed using seven or fewer pieces. His compositions often demonstrate a combination of strategic depth and thematic clarity.

He also regularly contributes articles related to chess composition for the news section of ChessStar.com, where he discusses developments and theoretical issues in the field.

== Chess problems ==
Ferhat Karmil (Turkey)
11th World Cup, 2023
1st Prize, Gold medal
«Zülfikar»

Position: b7 black pawn, d7 black pawn, e7 white knight, f7 white bishop, h7 black king, d6 black pawn, h6 black pawn, d5 white king, h5 white rook, g4 black pawn, a3 black pawn, e3 black pawn, g3 black pawn, c1 black bishop, g1 black knight, h1 black knight

Mate in 18 (4 + 12)

1. Bg6+! Kg7! 2. Rf5 h5! 3. Rf7+ Kh6 4. Rh7+ Kg5 5. Rxh5+ Kf6 6. Rf5+ Kg7 7. Rf7+ Kh6 8. Ke4!! Kg5! 9. Rf5+! Kh6 10. Rh5+ Kg7 11. Kf5! Nf3! 12. Rh7+ Kf8 13. Rf7+ Ke8 14. Rg7+! Kd8! 15. Nd5 Nh4+ 16. Kxg4! Nxg6 17. Rg8+ Nf8 18. Rxf8#

Ferhat Karmil (Turkey)
10th World Cup, 2022
2nd Prize, Silver medal
Dedicated to Natalia Kakabadze

Position: g8 white rook, h7 black king, d6 black pawn, f6 white king, h6 black pawn, a5 black pawn, d5 white bishop, f5 black pawn, h5 black pawn, a4 black rook, d4 black knight, g4 black pawn, d3 black bishop, c1 black knight

Mate in 21 (3 + 11)

1. Rg7+! Kh8 2. Rg6 Kh7 3. Bg8+ Kh8 4. Bf7 Kh7 5. Rg7+ Kh8 6. Rg8+ Kh7 7. Ra8! f4 8. Ra7! Ne6! 9. Bxe6+ Kh8 10. Ra8+ Kh7 11. Bg8+ Kh8 12. Bf7+! Kh7 13. Ra7! Be4! 14. Rd7! Kh8! 15. Bg6! Bd5 16. Rd8+ Bg8 17. Bf7! Nd3 18. Bxg8 Ne5 19. Be6+ Kh7 20. Bf5+ Ng6 21. Bxg6#

== Awards ==
In 2022, Karmil received the silver medal in the FIDE World Cup in Chess Composition, placing second in the moremovers section.

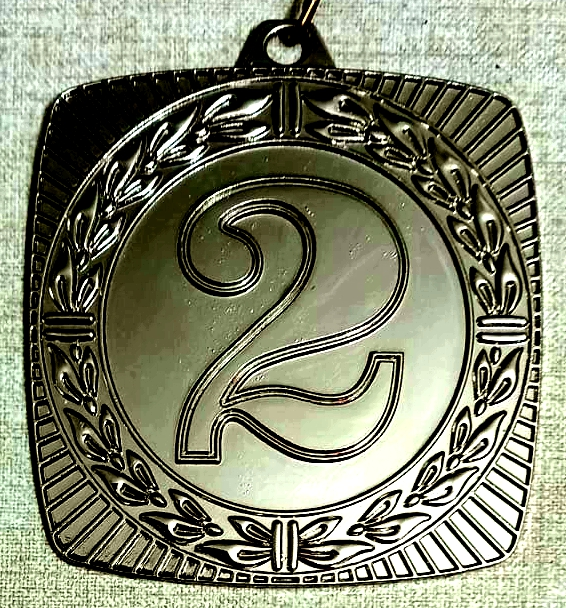
Obverse of the silver medal for second place in the World Cup, moremovers section (2022).

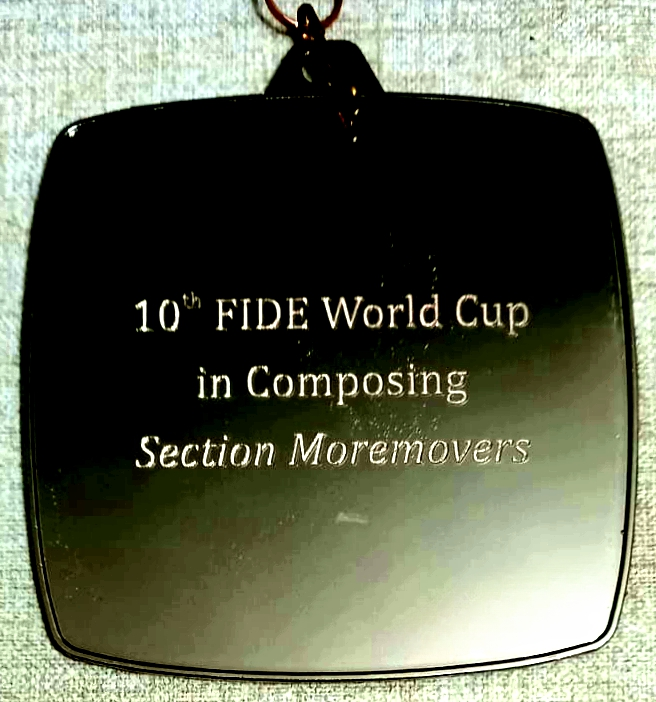
Reverse of the silver medal with competition and section details.

In 2023, he was awarded the gold medal as the winner of the moremovers section in the FIDE World Cup in Chess Composition.

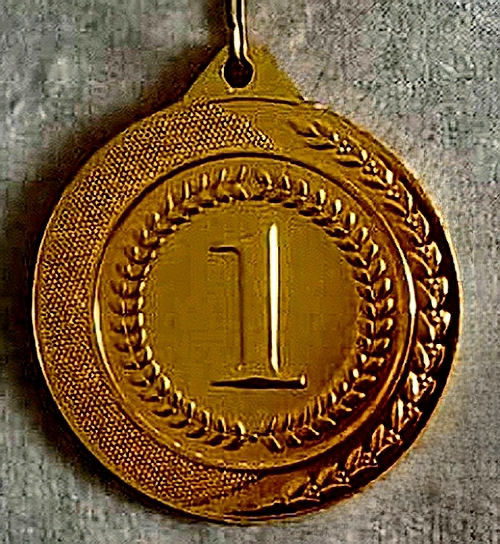
Obverse of the gold medal, awarded in the moremovers section (2023).

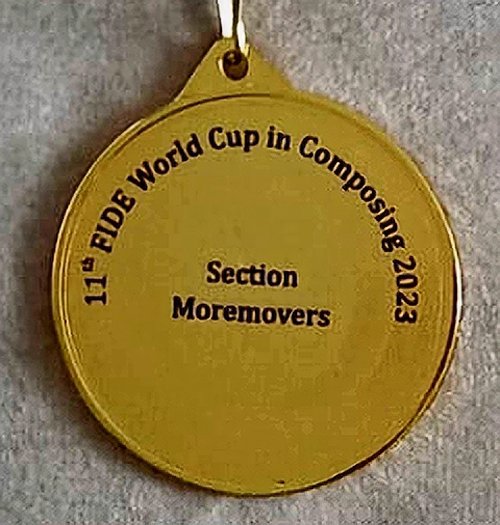
Reverse of the medal with engraved competition details.

== Certificates and official documents ==
The following certificates and plaques illustrate Karmil's official titles and achievements in the field of chess composition:

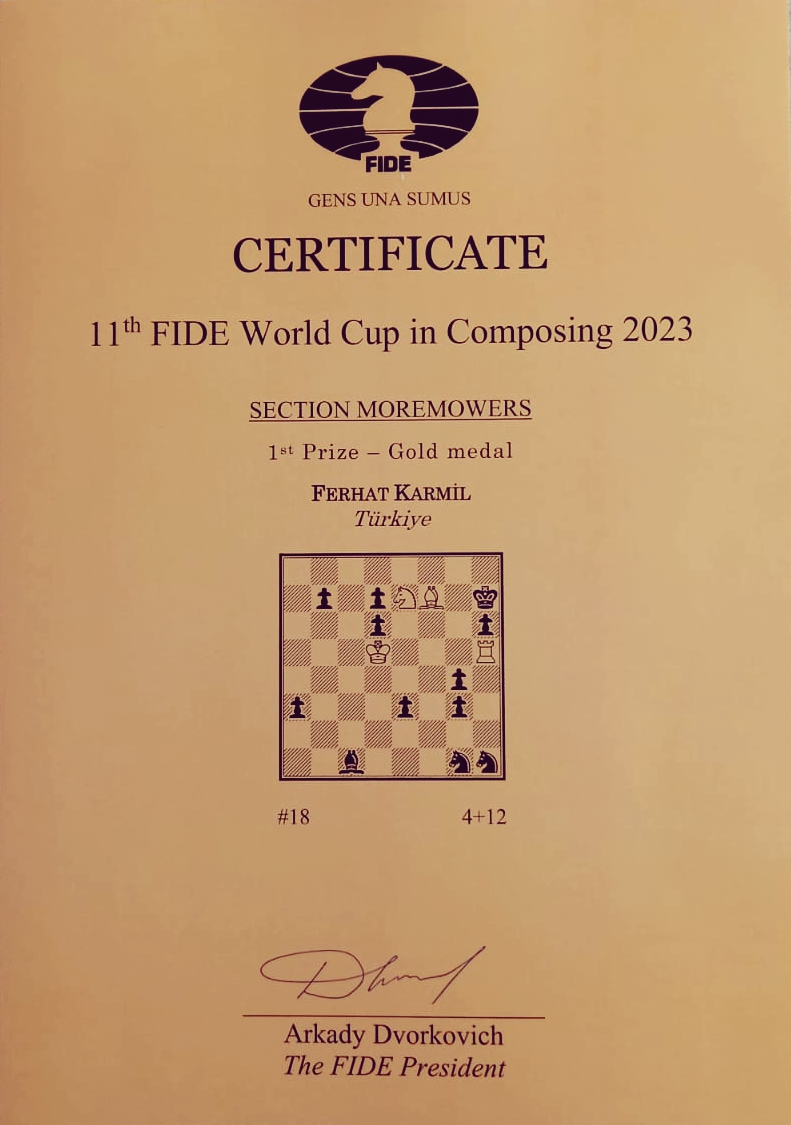
Certificate confirming first place in the FIDE World Cup, 2023.

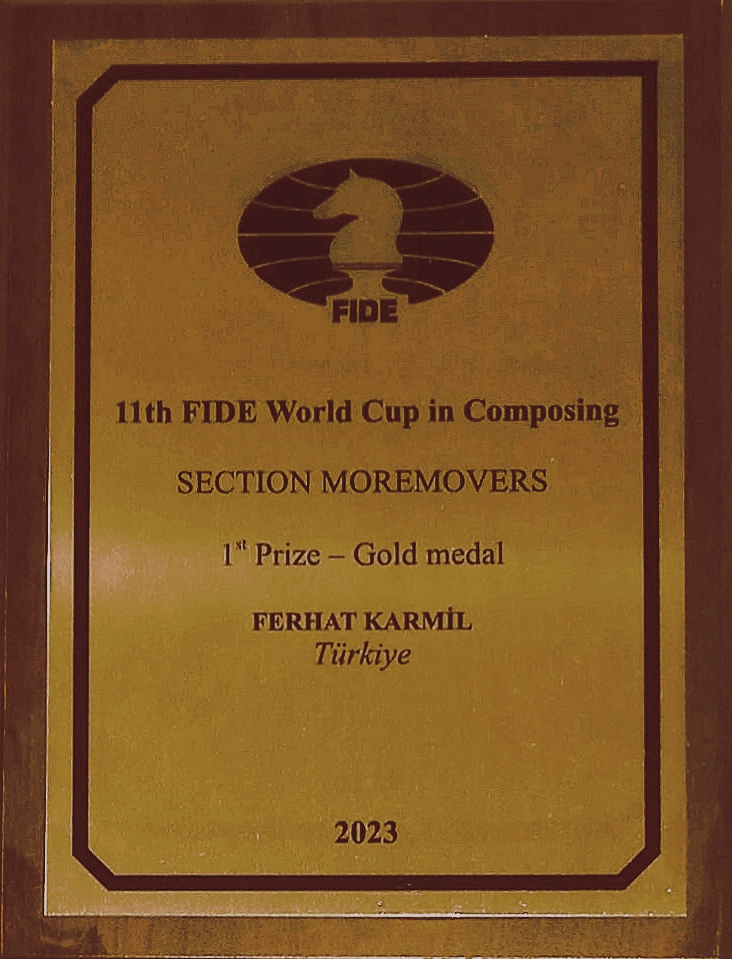
Commemorative plaque awarded for the 2023 victory.

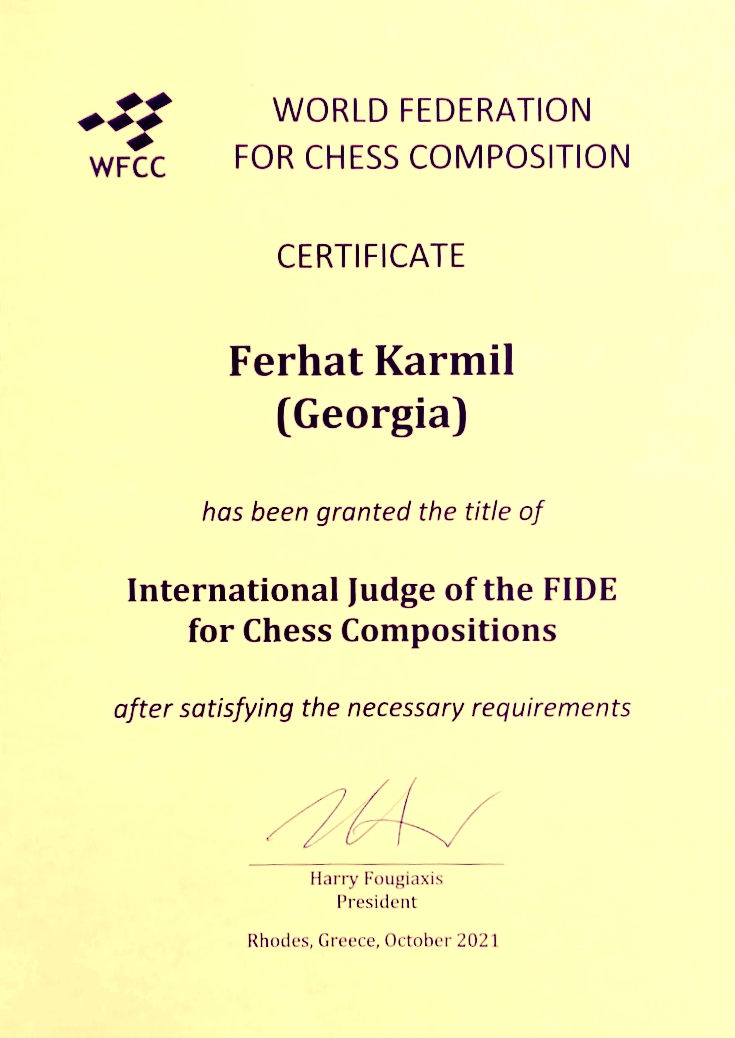
Certificate of appointment as International Judge for Chess Composition, 2021.

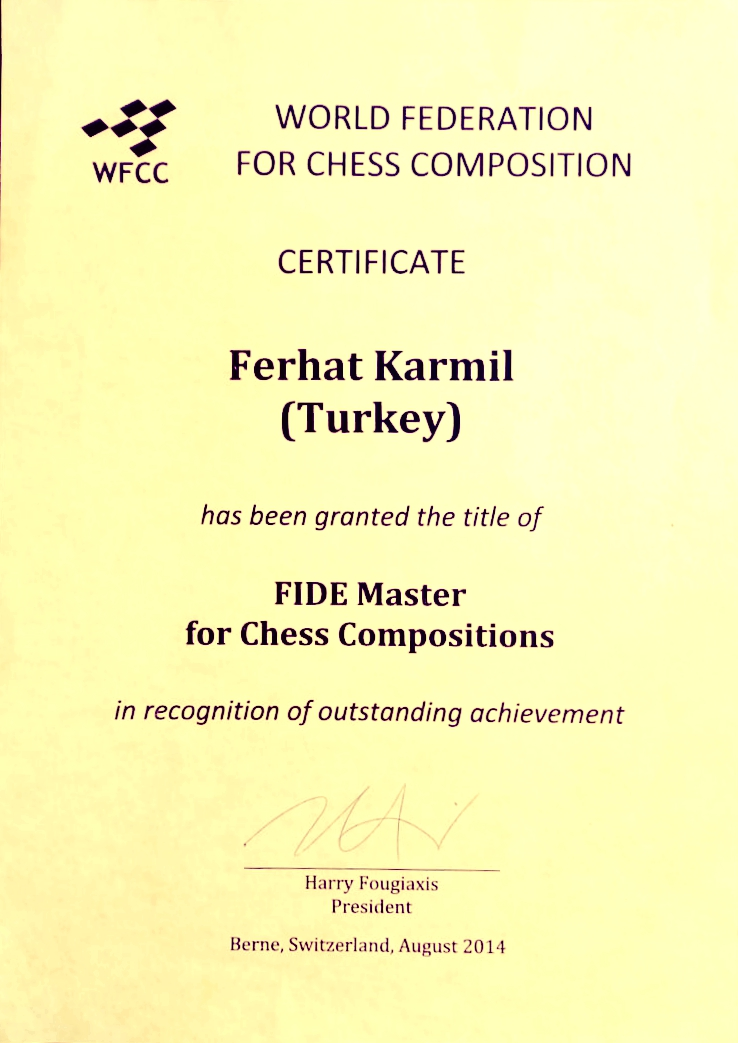
FIDE Master title certificate for Chess Composition, 2014.

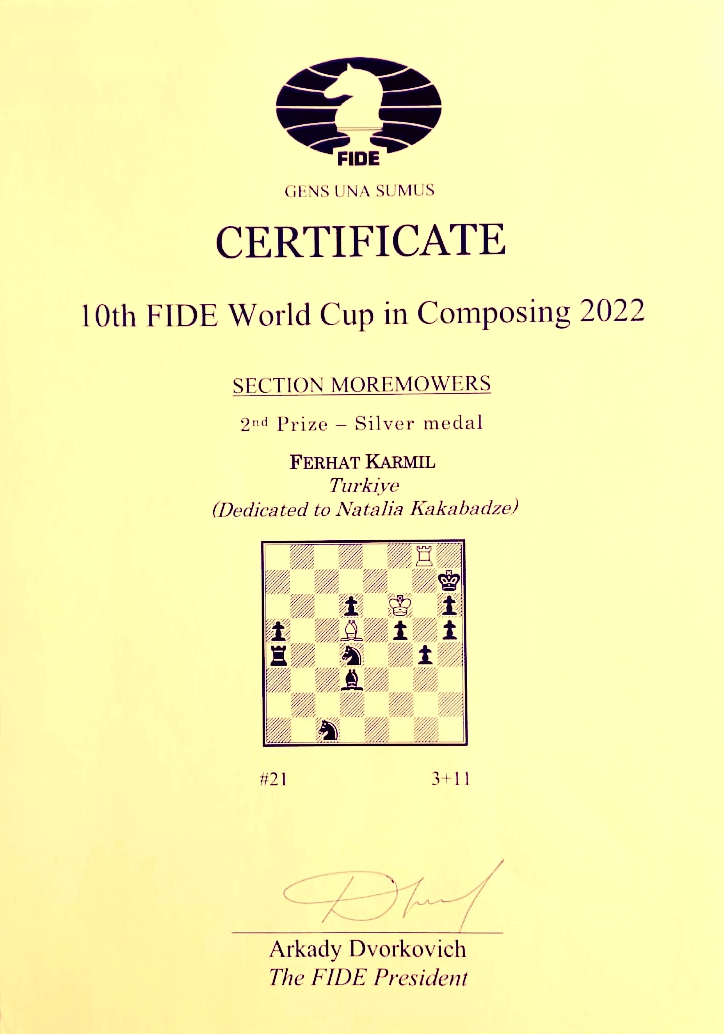
Certificate for second prize in the FIDE World Cup, 2022.
