= Bülent Atalay =

Turkish-American educator, author, scientist, and artist (born 1940)

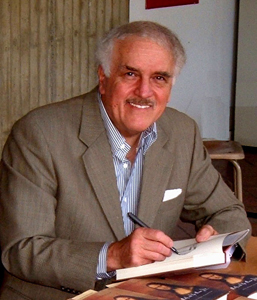
- Born: Ankara, Turkey
- Scientific career
- Fields: Physics
- Workplaces: University of Mary Washington

Bülent Atalay (born 1940) is a Turkish-American educator, author, scientist, and artist.

Born in Ankara, Turkey in 1940, Atalay is the author of the best selling book, Math and the Mona Lisa: the Art and Science of Leonardo da Vinci, initially published in English by Smithsonian Books in 2004, and subsequently in 13 foreign languages. A more recent book, Leonardo’s Universe: the Renaissance World of Leonardo da Vinci, coauthored with Keith Wamsley, was released by National Geographic Books in late 2008, and immediately listed among Encyclopædia Britannica Blog's "Ten Must-Have Reference Books from 2008." He is also a blog writer for National Geographic Newswatch.

A theoretical nuclear physicist, he is the author of numerous technical articles in physics. He is a professor emeritus of physics, having taught for four decades at the University of Mary Washington, an adjunct professor at the University of Virginia, and a member of the Institute for Advanced Study, Princeton. He lectures around the world on his expertise in the "A-subjects" – art, archeology, astrophysics, atomic physics and Atatürk ... while claiming little knowledge in the "B-subjects" – business, banking, biology ... He is currently the President of the Atatürk Society of America, dedicated to the ideals of the founder of the modern Republic of Turkey, most importantly, the secular governance.

An artist, his works have been exhibited in one-man shows in London and Washington D.C., and his books of lithographs – "Lands of Washington: Impressions Ink" and "Oxford and the English Countryside: Impressions of Ink" – were both published by Eton House in the 1970s, but are no longer in print. Copies of his books of lithographs can be found in the permanent collections of the White House, the Smithsonian Institution and Buckingham Palace.

He frequently serves as a special topics lecturer on board ships of the Crystal Cruise Line and Seabourn Cruises.

== Education ==
http://bulentatalay.com/about.htm St. Andrew's School, Georgetown University. BS, MS, PhD on a NATO Scholarship Post Doc: UCal-Berkeley; Post Doc: Princeton University Post Doc. University of Oxford, 'MA by Decree' Post Doc. Institute for Advanced Study, Princeton, NJ. 1974–75, 1981–82

== Books ==
- B. Atalay and K. Wamsley Leonardo's Universe: The Renaissance World of Leonardo da Vinci (National Geographic Books, 2009)
- B. Atalay, Math and the Mona Lisa: the Art and Science of Leonardo da Vinci (Smithsonian Books, 2004)
- B. Atalay, Oxford and the English Countryside: Impressions in Ink (Eton House, 1974)
- B. Atalay, Lands of Washington: Impressions in Ink (Eton House, 1972)

== A Selection of Technical Papers ==
- B. Atalay, Organizing Chair and Editor; Yuval Ne'eman, Honorary Chair. Committee II: "Symmetry in Its Various Aspects: Search for Order in the Universe I " International Conference on the Unity of the Science XXI. Washington, DC (1997). Paragon House Publishing Co. Multiple Authors.
- B. Atalay, Organizing Chair and Editor, Committee I: "Symmetry in Its Various Aspects: Search for Order in the Universe II." International Conference on the Unity of the Science XXII, Seoul, Korea (2000). Paragon House Publishing Co. Multiple Authors.
- B. Atalay, Ed. M. Alonso, "Mathematical Model for the Origin of Life: The Emergence of Self-Replicating Molecular Systems." Organization and Change in Complex Systems, Paragon House Publishing Co. (1990). Multiple Authors.
- Atalay, B.; Mann, A.; Privman, V. (1978). "United-atom projected perturbation theory for a homonuclear diatomic molecule". Physics Letters A. 65 (3). Elsevier BV: 193–195. Bibcode:1978PhLA...65..193A. doi:10.1016/0375-9601(78)90144-5. ISSN 0375-9601.
- Atalay, B.I.; Mann, A. (1978). "On the characterization of symmetry-adapted Rayleigh-Schrödinger perturbation theories". Physics Letters A. 66 (6). Elsevier BV: 433–436. Bibcode:1978PhLA...66..433A. doi:10.1016/0375-9601(78)90387-0. ISSN 0375-9601.
- Atalay, B.I.; Mann, A.; Zelicoff, A. (1978). "Perturbation theory for projected states in the pairing force model, III. The Problem of Spurious States". Nuclear Physics A. 295 (2). Elsevier BV: 204–210. Bibcode:1978NuPhA.295..204A. doi:10.1016/0375-9474(78)90109-4. ISSN 0375-9474.
- Atalay, Bulent; Mann, Ady (1977). "Realization of the transformation operator in the Jansen—Byers brown perturbation theory for exchange interactions". Chemical Physics Letters. 45 (3). Elsevier BV: 487–488. Bibcode:1977CPL....45..487A. doi:10.1016/0009-2614(77)80071-7. ISSN 0009-2614.
- Atalay, B.; Mann, A. (1977). "Simple non-hermitian choices for the standardization operator in projected perturbation theory". Physics Letters A. 60 (4). Elsevier BV: 269–270. Bibcode:1977PhLA...60..269A. doi:10.1016/0375-9601(77)90093-7. ISSN 0375-9601.
- B. Atalay, A. Mann, "A Note on the Jeziorski-Piela Perturbation Theory," Acta Physica Polonica, A51, 275 (1977).
- Atalay, B.I.; Mann, A. (1975). "Perturbation theory for projected states in the pairing force model, II. The Problem of Convergence". Nuclear Physics A. 238 (1). Elsevier BV: 70–78. Bibcode:1975NuPhA.238...70A. doi:10.1016/0375-9474(75)90339-5. ISSN 0375-9474.
- Atalay, B.; Brink, D.M.; Mann, A. (1974). "Perturbation theory for projected states in the pairing force model". Nuclear Physics A. 218 (3). Elsevier BV: 461–469. Bibcode:1974NuPhA.218..461A. doi:10.1016/0375-9474(74)90035-9. ISSN 0375-9474.
- Atalay, B.; Brink, D.M.; Mann, A. (1973). "A product form for projection operators". Physics Letters B. 46 (2). Elsevier BV: 145–146. Bibcode:1973PhLB...46..145A. doi:10.1016/0370-2693(73)90666-7. ISSN 0370-2693.
- Atalay, B.; Peierls, Sir R.E.; Mann, A. (27 November 1973). "Perturbation theory for projected states II. Convergence criteria and a soluble model". Proceedings of the Royal Society of London. Series A, Mathematical and Physical Sciences. 335 (1602). The Royal Society: 251–266. Bibcode:1973RSPSA.335..251A. doi:10.1098/rspa.1973.0124. ISSN 2053-9169. S2CID 123387424.
- Atalay, B. I.; Chiao-Yap, L. W. (1 February 1972). "Unified Model in Intermediate Coupling Applied to the Odd-Mass Isotopes of Indium". Physical Review C. 5 (2). American Physical Society (APS): 369–381. Bibcode:1972PhRvC...5..369A. doi:10.1103/physrevc.5.369. ISSN 0556-2813.
