= Yener Sonusen =

Turkish businessman (born 1959)

Yener Sonuşen
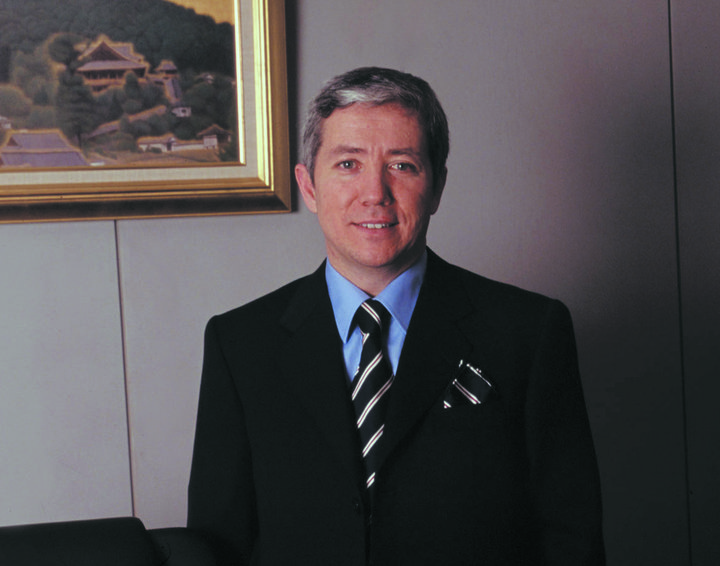
- Born: May 1, 1959 (age 67); Turkey
- Education: Boğaziçi University (B.A.); International Christian University (Masters); Marmara University (Ph.D.)
- Occupations: Former COO and Board Member Ülker (2003-2005); Board Member The Savola Group; Operating Executive Carlyle Group

Yener Mehmet Sonuşen is a Turkish businessman. He is on the boards of Savola Food Inc., Yudum Food Co., Bahçeşehir Koleji and Egypt food Co.

== Education ==
Yener Sonuşen holds a B.A. in Management from Boğaziçi University, Master's degree from International Christian University in Tokyo, Japan with studies in international negotiations and Ph.D. in cross cultural negotiations from Marmara University in Istanbul, Turkey.

== Career ==
Sonuşen was the Board member and COO of Ülker group of companies until December 2005. Since then, he is a management consultant, for reorganization and negotiation projects. Until 2012 he was the Honorary Consul of Kazakhstan Government in Turkey for some years.

== Other interests ==
Sonuşen is the author of "Fuji Dağıyla Konuştum", where he talks about his experiences throughout his time in Japan.

He is a member of different organizations and associations, including Japan Institute of Negotiations, and continues to participate in workshops from time to time at Insead and IMD-MIT Sloan. Sonuşen taught an 'Advanced Management' course, in Boğaziçi University He has been honored by IESC for his contributions in promoting Free Enterprise and Democracy in Turkey.
