= Serhat Ulueren =

Turkish sports reporter and journalist (born 1969)

- Born: 1969 (age 56–57); Istanbul, Turkey
- Occupations: Journalist, sports reporter
- Writing career
- Years active: 1992-present

Serhat Ulueren (born 1969) is a Turkish sports reporter and journalist.

== Biography ==
Serhat Ulueren was born in 1969 in Istanbul, Turkey. He started his journalism career in 1992. He is currently the director of Turkish football programme Telegol, screened every Sunday evening on Startv. Ulueren has also stated in an interview that he received threats from Diyarbakırspor due to his statements about Diyarbakırspor deserving to be relegated to the second division. Serhat Ulueren is believed to be a fan of Turkish giants Galatasaray, although never stating this on his show. Recently a group of Fenerbahçe fans angrily protested against Serhat Ulueren on the Bağdat Avenue, Istanbul. These protests were made following Ulueren's decision to invite confesser Cihan Oskay to his programme, Cihan Oskay made controversial claims about Fenerbahçe and Aziz Yıldırım being involved in match-fixing cases. Fenerbahçe board and its fans insisted that Ulueren acted unfairly and partially, as well as stating that Ulueren didn't ask for a response from Fenerbahçe based on these claims.

Recently Ulueren has been criticized due to the unfavoured and heated arguments that usually take place in his weekly programme Telegol. The television ratings have even decreased due to the unnecessary fall outs. Serhat works alongside: Adnan Aybaba (brother of a former Beşiktaş J.K. player), Sabri Ugan (presenter and commentator for Startv) and former Süper Lig referee Cem Papila. Serhat Ulueren is a close friend of fellow Startv journalists Süleyman Rodop (who has worked with Ulueren for about 18 years) and Ertem Şener (also a soccer commentator). Serhat Ulueren is presenting the telegol program on Liderhaber TV together with Adnan Akbaba, Gökmen Özdenak and Selim Soydan.

He was found guilty by Turkish court because of aspersing and he was drawn jail terms for 11 months 20 days.

There are some allegations about him. One of them is that working his wife with Adnan Polat who was expresident of Galatasaray. Despite she was not capable, Adnan polat who was president of ceramic manufacturers association made her chief editor to magazine of ceramic manufacturers association and because of this Serhat Ulueren had made tricky television program for Adnan Polat.
