= Rıza Maksut İşman =

Turkish middle-distance runner (1914–2004)

Rıza Maksut (right) training a tennis player

Rıza Maksut İşman (15 March 1914 – 30 December 2004) was a Turkish athlete.

== Biography ==
İşman was born in Istanbul on 15 March 1914. He started sports through cycling. He has many medals in track and field. He has trained many athletes, including Cahit Önel. He has been on the athletics teams of Fenerbahçe and Galatasaray clubs. İşman died in İzmir on 30 December 2004, at the age of 90.

== Achievements ==
- 1935 - Ranked first in National Championship at 5000m in 16:51.4 and at 10000m in 35:15.1.
- 1938 - Ran 1500m in Taksim in 4:11.2 which remained the Turkish record until 1948.
- 1939 - Ranked first in National Championship at 5000m in 16:08.3.
- 1940 - Participated in the 11th Balkan Games in Istanbul, where athletes from Turkey, Greece and Yugoslavia have competed. He won the 800m in 2:01.2.
- 1948 - He competed for the Turkish team in 800m (2:01.1), 1500m and 4 × 400 m relay in the 1948 Summer Olympics held in London. His teammate Ruhi Sarıalp won bronze medal in triple jump. The 4 × 400 m team consisted of Seydi Dinçtürk, Rıza Maksut İşman, Doğan Acarbay and Kemal Horulu, finishing in 3:35.0.
- 1960 - Served the Turkish team as massage therapist at the 1960 Summer Olympics held in Rome.
- 1964 - He was on the Turkish team in the 1964 Summer Olympics held in Tokyo.
- 1975 - He competed in the 200m, 800m, and 3000m finals in the age group 60-64 in the First World Masters Track and Field Championships held in Toronto, Canada. In the 800m with a time of 2:23.9 he placed first and broke the masters Canadian Open Record. In the 3000m he finished second with a time of 10:51.8 behind William G. Andberg who broke the masters world record with a time of 10:46.9. He placed fifth in the 200m with a time of 28.2.

== Sources ==
- Galatasaray Athletics - cites Riza Maksut Isman (in Turkish)
- 11th Balkan Games - results of the 1940 Balkan Games (PDF file)
- Balkan Games/Championships - Riza Maksut listed under 800 m
- 1948 London Olympics - review of Turkish athlete results
- Olimpiyatlarda Turkler
- Sporla genç kalanlar - Interview with Riza Maksut in Hürriyet newspaper
- İşman'ı kaybettik - obituary
- Süper Dede için gözyaşı - obituary
