= Fahir Ersin =

Turkish journalist, intellectual (1929-1988)

Fahir Ersin (February 22, 1929 – April 1, 1988) was a Turkish journalist, intellectual and a proponent of rights of Turkish Migrants in Germany and of Turkish-German relations. He was born in Istanbul, Turkey, as son of Ayshe Sultan from the descendants of the ancient Jandarid dynasty, a regional noble family in Turkey, and of a father of Cypriot origins, Mahir Ersin.

He studied Political Sciences and Journalism at the University of Istanbul. He is considered as one of the most respected journalists of his generation in Turkey, known as active proponent of the integration of Turkish migrants in German society. Having been involved in politics during his youth years within the press staff of the Prime Minister's office of Adnan Menderes in 1957, he was Chief Editor of various Turkish newspapers such as Adalet and Son Posta in the 1960s, and chief editor of subsequent major Turkish newspapers such as Tercuman. He was among the first founding staff of the leading newspaper Milliyet as a close collaborator of famous Turkish journalist Abdi Ipekçi.

He also served under the government of Suleyman Demirel as speaker of the government in the 1960s. In the 1970s, during the government of Bülent Ecevit, Ersin was offered various diplomatic functions in Iraq, Lebanon, Switzerland, Germany and Belgium. During the 1980s, Ersin was chief editor of the European edition of the Turkish newspaper Tercuman, based in Frankfurt a.M., Germany. A highly respected journalist and member of honor of the Turkish Press Association, he was a proponent of the rights of Turkish migrants in Germany and of Turkish-German relations. Ersin died in 1988 in Bonn, Germany. Ersin was survived by his wife Ayten, his daughters Tomurcuk and Mihriban, and his sons Tufan and Mert. In 1989, the European Association of Turkish Journalists named an award after Fahir Ersin, which is given yearly to a journalist promoting the rights of Turkish migrants in Europe.
