= List of mayors of Giresun =

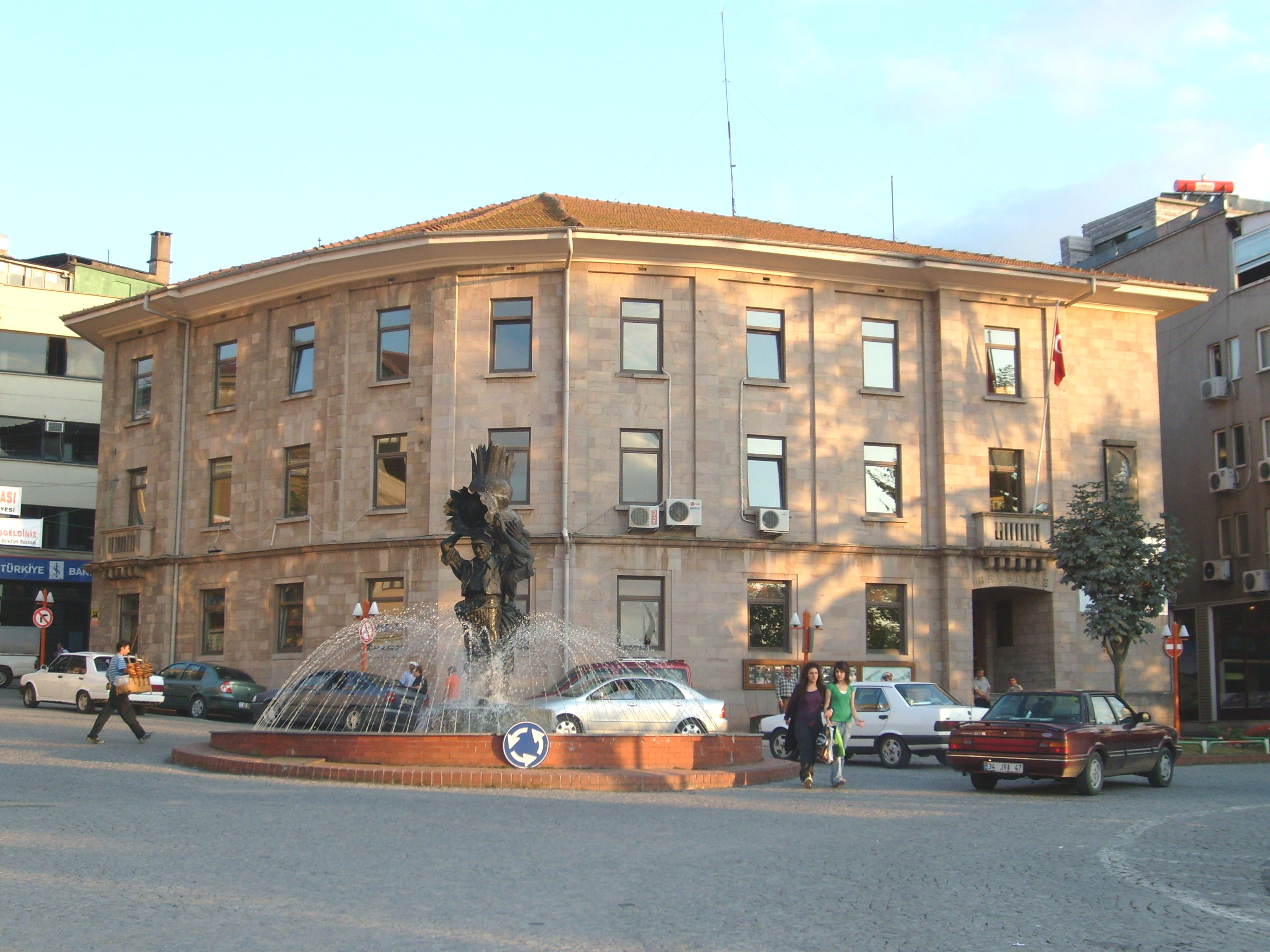
Giresun Municipality Building

Ferudunzade Osman Ağa

This is a list of mayors of Giresun, Turkey, since 1869.

Term	Mayor	Born-Died
1869–1873	Abdullah Bey	
1873–1874	Bekir Efendi	
1874–1877	Pastırmacıoğlu Mustafa Efendi	
1877–1881	Kaptan Bayazıtoğlu Mahmut	
1881–1906	Kaptan Yorgi Konstankilidis Paşa	
1906–1909	Hacıahmetoğlu Arif Efendi	
1909–1912	Bayazıtoğlu Hüseyin Nazif Efendi	
1912–1914	Matos Ağa	
1914–1916	Sarı Mahmutzade Hasan Efendi	
1916–1916	Dizdarzade Eşref Bey	
1919–1920	Ferudunzade Osman Ağa	
1920–1930	Hasan Vehbi Efendi	
1930–1931	Hacıahmetoğlu Hasan Tahsin	
1931–1944	Dizdarzade Eşref Bey	
1944–1950	Naci Cimşit	
1950–1953	Fahri Ekmekçi	
1953–1953	İsmail Ferudun	
1953–1955	Azmi Göksel	
1955–1958	Ali Saim Bozdağ	
1958–1958	Fevzi Ekmekçi	
1959–1960	Azmi Göksel	
1960–1962	Bilal Taranoğlu	
1962–1963	Recai Bulam	
1963–1968	Ali Rıza Erkan	
1968–1973	Ali Naci Duyduk	
1973–1977	Ali Rıza Erkan	
1977–1980	Orhan Yılmaz	
1980–1984	Saffet Bayazıtoğlu	
1984–1984	Müslüm Dirican	
1984–1989	Mehmet Larçın	
1989–1994	Mehmet Işık	
1994–1999	Mehmet Larçın	
1999–2002	Mehmet Işık	
2002–2004	Hasan Yücel Karaibrahim	
2004–2009	Hurşit Yüksel	
2009-2019	Kerim Aksu	
2019–2024	Aytekin Şenlikoğlu	
from 2024	Fuat Köse	
