= Ahmet Köklügiller =

Turkish contemporary writer and influential educationist (born 1936)

Ahmet Köklügiller (born 1936) is a Turkish contemporary writer and an influential educationist.

== Early life ==
He was born in Adana, Turkey. He worked in Tarsus as a teacher.

== Career ==
Later he lectured in Istanbul, and since 1957 he has been writing for magazines and newspapers. He wrote study and auxiliary books for schools. He attended Cuma Fakılı Primary School and the Düziçi Primary Teachers Training School (1957) and graduated from the Balıkesir Necatibey Institute of Education, Department of Literature (1960). He worked as a teacher of literature at secondary schools in Bartın, İvrindi, Tarsus and İstanbul. He retired in 1986.

He is known for his research and textbooks on literature. He is a former member of the Turkish Language Association, a member of the Language Society and the Writers Syndicate of Turkey.

His early works appeared in the review Damla (Edirne) in 1954. His other works were published in the reviews Varlık, Ilgaz, Şölen, Türk Dili and İmece and in the newspaper Öğretmenler.

His service as a teacher earned him an image as a dedicated educationist, giving influential classes to his students.

== Bibliography ==
- Ağrılı Üçgen (Painful Triangle, in collaboration with M. Uz and İ. Atlıhan, 1960)
- Türkçe Temel Bilgiler (Basic Knowledge of the Turkish Language, 1973)
- Noktalama ve İmla Sözlüğü (A Dictionary of Punctuation and Spelling, 1973)
- Nutuk (The Great Speech, simplified and condensed version of the “Great Speech” by Atatürk, 1973)
- Türkçe ve Edebiyat Sözlüğü (A Dictionary of Turkish and Literature, 1974)
- Açıklamalarıyla Atasözlerimiz (Our Proverbs with Their Explanations, 1979)
- Atatürk'ümüz (Our Atatürk, 1986)
- Edebiyatımızda Şairler ve Yazarlar (Writers and Poets in Our Literature, 1988)
- Yazarlar ve Şairler Sözlüğü (A Dictionary of Writers and Poets, 2002).

=== Books ===
- Tonguç Baba (Father Tonguç, 1981)
- Atatürk (Atatürk, 1976)
- Gılgamış (Gilgamesh, 1983)
- Karacaoğlan (Karacaoğlan, 1984)
- Pir Sultan (Pir Sultan, 1984).

In addition, he has published collections and children’s literature.

== Notes ==
- "Ana Sayfa - T.C. Kültür ve Turizm Bakanlığı". www.kultur.gov.tr (in Turkish).
- "ahmet köklügiller AHMET KÖKLÜGİLLER ahmet koklugiller AHMET KOKLUGILLER - Antoloji.Com Kitap". 2006-05-16. Archived from the original on 2006-05-16.
