= Melek Mazici =

Turkish artist (born 1956)

Melek Mazici (born November 25, 1956 Istanbul, Turkey) is a Finnish visual artist. She has lived and worked in Finland since 1981. Mazici has also worked in London, Stockholm, Paris, Brussels and New York.

Mazici is of Turkish descent. She studied at the Mimar Sinan Fine Arts University (formerly known as Istanbul State Academy of Fine Arts) from 1975 to 1981, majoring in painting. From 1984 to 1989, she studied at the Finnish Academy of Fine Arts, Helsinki, where she specialized in graphic arts. Mazici further complemented her studies as a fellow at the Royal University College of Fine Arts in Stockholm from 1989 to 1990.

Mazici began her career working with graphic arts. In addition, she has expressed herself through installations and acrylic painting.

Mazici's artwork is generally inspired by organic shapes, such as flowers or landscapes. In her work, these themes often signify landscapes of mind and transparency, which offer the viewer the opportunity to mirror their own emotions. During her decades-long artistic career, Mazici's artistic style has been living and developing through different countries, landscapes and landscapes of mind.

Since the year 1980, Mazici has had regular solo exhibitions and has participated in numerous group exhibitions in Finland and abroad in Turkey, the United States, France, Japan, Germany and Ireland. Her artwork is also featured in private and public collections around the world. In Finland, her work is included in the Finnish National Gallery, the Helsinki City Art Museum and the Pori Art Museum collections. In Turkey, Mazici's work is displayed at the Galeri Nev gallery, and has also been acquired in significant private collections.

Melek Mazici is a two-time recipient (2000, 2010) of the five-year Finnish State Grant for Artists.

In 2014, Transparency, a book detailing Melek Mazici's artwork, received an award recognizing it as one of the most beautiful Finnish books.
