= Hakan Çelik =

Turkish journalist, columnist, radio and television presenter (born 1969)

- Born: Mehmet Hakan Çelik; 10 September 1969 (age 57); Beyoğlu, Istanbul, Turkey
- Education: Istanbul University
- Occupations: Journalist, columnist, radio and TV presenter

Photograph of Çelik

Hakan Çelik (born 10 September 1969) is a Turkish journalist, columnist, radio and television presenter.

== Early years ==
Hakan Çelik was born in Beyoğlu, Istanbul on 10 September 1969. He was educated in Communications at Istanbul University. He completed Master's degree programs on "Science fiction cinema" in the Faculty of Communications and on "Political structure of the European Union" in the Faculty of Political Science at his alma mater.

== Career ==
He entered the media world in the newspaper Günaydın in 1988, and became one of the first private radio broadcasters in Turkey, after interning in the BBC at Glasgow in the 1990s. Later, he joined the staff to found Hür FM, a Hürriyet Radio, and produced shows for Show Radio,

Hakan Çelik won a scholarship from the British Foreign Office and went to London in 1992, and he gave conferences in Germany, Japan and the U.S. upon invitations from these governments. He travelled in more than 100 countries as a journalist and received awards from many institutions for his professional achievements.

Since 1997, he is a columnist in the newspaper Posta and since 2005 he is the representative of the same paper in Ankara. He continued in producing radio and television shows, and for three years he was the producer and presenter of the TV show Weekend of the TV channel Haberturk TV, which, upon the death of founder, Ufuk Güldemir, was sold to Ciner Media Group. Later, since February 2008, he is the weekend moderator of the morning shows of the channel Kanal 24. He used to be a commentator between January 2010 – July 2011, and a contributor and commentator for another TRT Radio 1 program "Gündem".
