= Selim Deringil =

Turkish historian (born 1951)

- Born: 19 August 1951 (age 75)
- Education: University of East Anglia(PhD.)
- Occupation: historian

Selim Deringil (born Ottawa, 19 August 1951) is a Turkish academic, and professor of history at Boğaziçi University and at the Lebanese American University.

== Career ==
Deringil earned his doctorate from the University of East Anglia in 1979, and joined Boğaziçi University the same year. He is a notable lecturer on late Ottoman history, Ottoman Islam and relationships between Ottomans and Europe. He has lectured in the United States, England, France, Lebanon and Palestine. He has written several essays on the fall of the Ottoman Empire and the history of the Republic of Turkey. His book The Well-Protected Domains: Ideology and the Legitimation of Power in the Ottoman Empire 1876-1909 was awarded the Turkish Studies Association Fuad Köprülü prize in 2001.

== Partial bibliography ==
- The Ottomans, the Turks, and world power politics: collected essays, ISBN 975-428-179-3
- Turkish foreign policy during the Second World War: an "active" neutrality, ISBN 0-521-34466-2
- The well-protected domains: ideology and the legitimation of power in the Ottoman Empire, 1876–1909, ISBN 1-86064-307-8
