= List of mayors of Zile =

This is a list of mayors of Zile, Turkey.

== Governors as mayors 1923–1960 ==
After the proclamation of the republic on 29 October 1923, the governor of the city was charged with the duties as deputy mayor. With the municipality act of 3 April 1930, the title of mayor was abandoned and the governor of Istanbul province took over the duties of the mayor. The two separate councils of the province and the municipality were unified. The two councils were reestablished on 1 March 1957.

- 1 Bahri Uğur 1923–1926
- 2 Muharrem Alacalı 1926–1932
- 3 Fevzi Eken 1932–1934
- 4 Zihni Aksoy 1934–1938
- 5 Sıtkı Eken 1942–1943
- 6 Kazım Kaleli 1943–1944
- 7 Kazım Ahçıoğlu 1944–1946
- 8 Salim Eken 1946– 1948
- 9 Rahmi Kayran 1948–1950
- 10 Ahmet Vanlı 1950–1954
- 11 İsmail Odabaş 1954–1955
- 12 Macir R. Gürsoy 1955–1957
- 13 İhsan Sarısoy 1957–1960

== Military rule (1960–1963) ==
After the coup d'etat on 27 May 1960, the military abandoned the mayor and appointed 7 officials until 1963.

- 14 Mehmet Güçlü 1960–1963

== Elected mayors (1963–1980) ==
The municipality act of 27 July 1963 enabled the election of the mayor. The polls held on 17 November 1963 were the first regional elections to elect the mayor.

- 15 Hüseyin Erdoğan 1963– 1965
- 16 Osman Çetin 1965–1972
- 17 Sabri Ünal Erkol 1972– 1975
- 18 Ahmet Vanlı 1975–1977
- 19 Nihat Çamsoy 1977– 1980

== Military rule (1980–1984) ==
During the military rule from 12 September 1980 until 1984, mayors were assigned. At this time, Nihat Çamsoy was the mayor.

- 20 Nurettin Kocaman 12 September 1980 – 26 March 1984

== Elected mayors (since 1984) ==
- 21 Nurettin Türkyılmaz 26 March 1984 – 1991 – ANAP
- 22 Şükrü Serimer 1991 – 27 March 1994 – MHP
- 23 Murat Tezcan 27 March 1994 – 18 April 1999 – CHP
- 24 Murat Avalıoğlu 18 April 1999 – 2009 – MHP
- 25 Lütfi Vidinel July 2009 – Present – AKParti
