= Ulaş Mangıtlı =

Turkish cartoonist and illustrator

Ulaş Mangıtlı is a Turkish cartoonist and illustrator.

He published a popular online humor/cartoon magazine called Hihehüğe. The magazine featured selected cartoons and the illustrated adventures of "Karavelet", a clumsy clandestine operative in the service of the Ottoman sultan. The "Empire of Mongolian Rabbits", a popular spin-off of the online magazine, featured original cartoons, comics and articles all about the history and politics of the fictitious Mongolian Rabbits bent on world domination, which had interesting similarities to modern-day Turkey.
