= Bikem Ekberzade =

Turkish journalist, photojournalist and documentary photographer (born 1971)

Bikem Ekberzade (born 1971) is a Turkish journalist, photojournalist and documentary photographer. She is known for her work on forced migration in the Balkans, Africa, Central Asia, and the Middle East. Since the 1990s, she has worked with numerous news outlets, including CNN International, Newsweek, Associated Press, Businessweek, Der Spiegel, and The New York Times. Ekberzade was selected the photographer of the month by European Press Network World Reporter in 2002. She was presented an award for her documentary work on refugees by UNHCR in 2004.

== Early life and education ==
Ekberzade was born in Istanbul. After having completed her high school education in Istanbul, she went to the United States where she received a bachelor's degree in Management from Boston University. During her studies, she worked with development projects for NGOs such as Oxfam America and worked on two summits for the World Economic Forum. In 1992, she completed her internship in London with John F. Chown & Associates, specializing in privatization in post-communist economies. Upon graduation she continued to work with Oxfam America, first on development and implementation of fundraising projects, and later as part of the production team at the Video Unit where her team completed several educational video documentaries on sustainable development and women’s empowerment in third world countries.

In 1995 Ekberzade went back to Boston University, this time to complete her master's degree at the College of Communications in the field of Broadcast Journalism. She worked for CNN Financial News (CNNfn) in New York City as an intern during her master’s program, and was later hired by CNN Southeast Bureau in Atlanta as a production assistant to help out with 1996 Atlanta Olympics. Her post was later extended to CNN International assignment desk.

== Life and work ==
Aside from CNN, during her graduate studies and up until 1998 Ekberzade has worked as a photojournalist for print and wire services such as The Boston Phoenix, the Associated Press, The New York Times, and Newsweek.

Among Ekberzade’s early documentary work is a 22-minute video documentary about the glamorous stage life of three drag queens, rightfully titled DRAG (a Boston Medcalf Awards Nominee.)

At the on-start of the Kosovo crisis Ekberzade moved back to Turkey to work as a freelance photographer covering the refugee flow and military maneuvers at the Albania-Kosovo-Macedonia triangle. She later shifted focus to other regions of conflict such as Africa, Central Asia, the Middle East and Europe. Aside from photographing wars and humanitarian crises Ekberzade also reported on them.

Ekberzade is also the curator of a documentary photography project called "The Refugee Project" which starts off with the war in the Balkans in 1998 and later expands on to document the lives of IDPs in Azerbaijan as well as the refugee crisis between Pakistan and Afghanistan. Further additions to the project has been an extensive documentary of illegal refugees living in Istanbul, and the refugee families from Darfur, Sudan, seeking protection in camps in Eastern Chad. Photographs from "The Refugee Project" has been published widely in Europe, United States and Turkey, as well as the body of work being invited to several exhibits at home and overseas. Several prints have been accepted to the permanent collection of the University of Kansas and the Oxford Museum.

Final leg of Ekberzade's documentary project on forced migration is "Crossings", also curated by the photographer herself, during the peak of the most recent refugee flow following the war in Syria and other ongoing conflicts in the Middle East and Central Asia. "Crossings", a multilingual, cross-platform intervention was part of Manifesta 11 in Zurich and "Contested Borderscapes" in Lesbos, among other art events. It was also due to take part in the Çanakkale Biennial; however the Biennial was cancelled last minute by the curators due to mounting pressure from local authorities.

Ekberzade is also the founder of a civil grassroots initiative called For Women, By Women (Kadinlar Icin, Kadinlar Tarafindan) which has brought several hundred Turkish female photographers together to make a stance on violence against women. The initiative is aimed at raising funds, through sales of photographs, for agencies and foundations whose aim is to fight violence against women. Since its start in March 2005, two NGOs have already benefited from the funds raised by the project.

Currently residing in Istanbul, Ekberzade continues to work as a freelance photojournalist and documentary photographer. Her latest project is an extension of "The Refugee Project", a continuation of "Illegal", a feature-length documentary about refugees in Turkey. The documentary aims to focus primarily on individual stories and through them have the existing legislations in Turkey regarding refugees discussed by officials.

== Books ==
In 2006, "Illegal", a book of photographs by Bikem Ekberzade, documenting the lives of two young African women, single mothers and illegal refugees trying to survive in Istanbul, came out from PlanB publishing.

In 2010, Ekberzade self-published her second book "West-end of the Border" as an e-photography book, first of its kind. The book details Ekberzade's one of many visits to the Sahel, to document the flight of the Sudanese from Darfur to neighbouring refugee camps in Eastern Chad.

In 2014, Ekberzade co-authored "tel•e•gen•ic (ˌtɛl ɪˈdʒɛn ɪk)" with curator Özge Ersoy including an end note by academic Thomas Keenan. SPOT Production Fund issued a 500 copy limited edition of "tel•e•gen•ic" as a flip book in both English and Turkish, as part of their annual production fund Domates Biber Patlican-Produce. The digital edition was shared online by the authors a year later. The book was intended to be a part of a trilogy and the co-authors, this time accompanied by journalist Mahmut Bozarslan on video call from Diyarbakır, delivered the second volume, "Pro•pa•gan•da" as a talk on 14 November 2015, as part of Amber '15 festival in Istanbul.

In 2016, Ekberzade started working on her most recent book, "Standing Rock: Greed, Oil and the Lakota's Struggle for Justice", detailing the stand-off at Standing Rock which came out from Zed Books in the fall of 2018.

Ekberzade’s editorial work continues to be published in various print and on-line services including The New York Times, Newsweek, Businessweek, Christian Science Monitor, NTV-MSNBC, Times Picayune, and DoubleTake Magazine. She has also contributed to several books such as the Danish version of "The Mantle of the Prophet" by Roy Mottahedeh and the Baku–Tbilisi–Ceyhan pipeline compendium.
