= Umut Güzelses =

Turkish footballer

Umut Güzelses אומיט גונזאלס
Personal information
- Date of birth: 15 May 1987 (age 39)
- Place of birth: Istanbul, Turkey
- Height: 1.84 m (6 ft 1/2 in)
- Position: Forward

Youth career
- 2005–2006: Hapoel Tel Aviv
- 2006–2007: Fenerbahçe PAF

Senior career*
Years	Team	Apps	(Gls)
2006–2009	Fenerbahçe	2	(0)
2007–2008	→ Hapoel Tel Aviv (loan)	2	(0)
2008–2009	→ Maccabi Herzliya (loan)	14	(1)
2009–2010	Gençlerbirliği	0	(0)
2009–2010	→ Hacettepe (loan)	5	(0)
2010–2011	Üsküdar Anadolu SK	9	(1)
2011–2013	Kastamonuspor	7	(0)

International career^{‡}
2007	Turkey U21	1	(0)
- * Club domestic league appearances and goals as of 06:59, 21 September 2009 (UTC) ‡ National team caps and goals as of 06:59, 21 September 2009 (UTC)

Umut Güzelses (Hebrew: אומיט גונזאלס; Omit Gonzales, born 15 May 1987) is a Turkish-Israeli former footballer.

== Childhood in Israel ==
The Güzelses family are Sephardi Jews, descendants of refugees who fled the Spanish Inquisition. They emigrated to Israel when Umut was three years old, but found acclimation to be difficult.

== Professional career in Israel ==
Umut began his career with Israeli club Hapoel Tel Aviv. In order to keep his Turkish citizenship and avoid conscription in to the Israeli army, he joined the Turkish army for a term of three months.

Hapoel was reluctant to let him go after Umut's father said that he had an offer from a top flight Turkish club. It was only after Umut's father climbed on top of one of the floodlights at the club's training ground and threatened to jump, that Umut was released from his contract.

== Professional career in Turkey ==
In 2005, Umut joined Turkish powerhouse Fenerbahçe. He made his debut in a match against Sivasspor on 11 November 2006. He was brought on in the 89th minute.

He is currently on loan with Maccabi Herzliya after being on loan with Hapoel Tel Aviv in the previous season. His contract with Fenerbahçe expires 31 May 2011.

== Career notes ==
Umut signed a four-year contract with Fenerbahçe on 1 June 2007 and was subsequently loaned to Hapoel Tel Aviv. Umut chose to play for Turkey U21 and played against Albania on 17 January 2007 for U21 level.

== Statistics ==
Club performance			League		Cup		League Cup		Continental		Total	
Season	Club	League	Apps	Goals	Apps	Goals	Apps	Goals	Apps	Goals	Apps	Goals
Turkey			League		Turkish Cup		League Cup		Europe		Total	
2006–2007	Fenerbahçe	Süper Lig	2	0	-	-	-	-	-	-	-	-
Total	Turkey		2	0	-	-	-	-	-	-	-	-
Israel			League		Israel State Cup		Toto Cup		Europe		Total	
2007–2008	Hapoel Tel Aviv	Ligat ha'Al	2	0	0	0	1	0	0	0	3	0
2008–2009	Maccabi Herzliya	Liga Leumit	14	1	1	0	10	2	0	0	25	2
Total	Israel		16	1	1	0	11	2	0	0	28	2
Career total			18	1	-	-	-	-	-	-	-	-
