= Şuayib Yalçın =

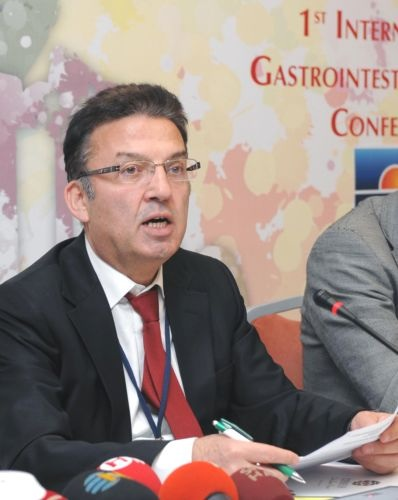
Suayib Yalcin during a press conference

Suayib Yalcin MD (Turkish: Şuayib Yalçın) is a medical oncologist. He has authored/co-authored more than 80 articles.

== Education ==
He graduated from Hacettepe University in Ankara, Turkey in 1989.

== Career ==
He became a medical oncologist in 1997. He worked as a post-doctoral fellow at the Gastrointestinal Oncology Department at the MD Anderson Cancer Center in Houston, Texas.

He was appointed as a full professor in 2004, while at Hacettepe University Cancer Institute.

He served as president of Turkish Society of Medical Oncology and President of Turkish Association for Cancer Research and Control. He is an active member of ASCO, ESMO, IASGO, MMOF and immediate past national representative of Turkey in ESMO.

He participated in clinical cancer research projects as a steering committee member, or principal investigator and serves on the editorial boards of cancer journals. He works at Hacettepe University, Department of Medical Oncology.

== Research ==
His main areas of research interest are gastrointestinal cancers, including neuroendocrine tumors and gastrointestinal stromal tumors as well as supportive care.
