= Zeynel A. Karcioglu =

Zeynel A. Karcioglu (born June 12, 1946) is a medical and surgical practitioner, researcher and medical educator. He is a diplomate of the American Board of Ophthalmology, specializing in Ophthalmic Oncology and Pathology particularly in areas of retinoblastoma, external eye tumors, and primary and metastatic orbital neoplasms. Karcioglu is also residency and fellowship trained in Anatomic Pathology and Neuropathology and certified by the American Board of Pathology.

== Early life and education ==
Karcioglu is a Turkish-American who was born in Istanbul, Turkey in 1946. In 1969, he received his medical degree at the Hacettepe University School of Medicine in Ankara, following residency trainings at Tulane University and Emory University School of Medicine in Ophthalmology and Pathology, respectively.

== Career ==
Karcioglu started his profession as a surgical pathologist at Emory University in Atlanta and later made a career move to ophthalmology, completing his residency at Tulane University School of Medicine in New Orleans, Louisiana. After his residency, he joined the ranks of the Tulane faculty and served as a clinician and educator with distinction for approximately 25 years, until Hurricane Katrina hit New Orleans in 2005; Karcioglu currently holds the rank of professor emeritus at Tulane University.

He has worked at schools in the southern United States, including Emory, Tulane, the University of Tennessee and the University of Virginia (UVA).

In 1995, Karcioglu was appointed to the endowed chair of George Haik Sr./St. Giles Foundation Professor of Ocular Oncology at Tulane and held the position until he left Tulane as an Emeritus Professor in 2005.

He is known as a prolific scientific writer in clinical ophthalmology and ophthalmic pathology. Karcioglu has produced numerous scientific papers, book chapters and books and has delivered many presentations and lectures in his areas of expertise at regional, national and international medical meetings. He has held numerous leadership offices in his field including the office of the president of The American Association of Ocular Oncologists and Pathologists (AAOOP), and has been acknowledged on several occasions as an outstanding medical educator, to his students, residents and fellows. Karcioglu served as the ophthalmology residency program director for more than ten years at Tulane University. During his tenure in this post he was recognized by his residents on numerous occasions with best teacher/ophthalmologist awards. In 1998 he received the State Recognition for Exceptional and Laudatory Contributions to Louisiana Higher Education. In 2016 he received the Zimmerman Medal of ASOOP and delivered the honorary Zimmerman Lecture at the American Academy of Ophthalmology meeting in Chicago, Illinois.

During a sabbatical leave, Karcioglu served as director of research and chief of the Ophthalmic Oncology Division at King Khalid Eye Specialist Hospital in Riyadh, Saudi Arabia. In addition to his regional research and clinical work, during his tenure in Riyadh he was involved in collaborative investigative projects with other medical institutions in Europe and the Middle and Far East.

Karcioglu has also been active in the classification and staging work of ophthalmic tumors under the auspices of the American Joint Commission of Cancer and has been an active participant to the functions of the International Society of Ocular Oncology and Pathology. Currently, he is employed by University of Virginia (UVA) as a professor of Ophthalmology and Pathology. Karcioglu is also a member of the Emily Couric Cancer Center in the same institution.

=== Artists' Eye Diseases ===
- Karcioglu ZA: Ocular Pathology in The Parable of the Blind Leading the Blind and other paintings by Pieter Bruegel. Grand Rounds Lecture Department of Ophthalmology, University of Virginia, Charlottesville, Virginia, April 2016
- Karcioglu ZA, Eliason DA: Edgar Degas's Eyes. Hospital Drive: The Literature and Humanities Journal of the University Of Virginia School Of Medicine, September 2015
- Karcioglu ZA: Diagnosing Tennessee: Diseases of Williams. Scholars Conference Lecture at Tennessee Williams Festival, New Orleans, Louisiana, March 2011
- Karcioglu ZA: Edgar Degas' Visit to New Orleans: A play of Four Canvasses. Riverside, Memphis, Tennessee, 2008
- Karcioglu ZA: Did Edgar Degas have a hereditary retinal degeneration? J Ophthalmic Genetics 2007; 28:51-5
- Karcioglu ZA: Edgar Degas' Ophthalmia. 10th Annual Clinical Update Course at Hamilton Eye Institute, Memphis, Tennessee, December, 2006
- Karcioglu, ZA: The Parable of the Blind Leading the Blind. The 14th annual George M. Kambara, M.D., Distinguished Visiting Professor Lecturer at University of Tennessee, Health Science Center, Memphis, Tennessee, June, 2004.
- Karcioglu, ZA: Blind Leading the Blind. Visiting Professor Lecture at Penn State University Medical School, Hershey, Pennsylvania, March 2004.
- Karcioglu, ZA: Heritage of Ophthalmology in Istanbul, Afro/Asian Congress of Ophthalmology, Istanbul, Turkey, June, 2004
- Karcioglu ZA: Bruegel Syndrome: Is the eponym well deserved? (Poster Presentation) European Society of Oculoplastic & Reconstructive Society (ESOPRS), Muenster, Germany, Sept 2002.
- Karcioglu ZA: The effect of bright New Orleans sun on Edgar Degas' "Ophthalmia" (poster presentation). Mathas Library of Tulane University Medical School May-Sept 2002.
- Karcioglu ZA: Ocular Pathology in The Parable of the Blind Leading the Blind and Other Paintings by Pieter Bruegel" Surv Ophthalmol, 47:55-62, 2002.
