= Gökhan Okan =

Turkish physician and author (born 1972)

Gokhan Okan
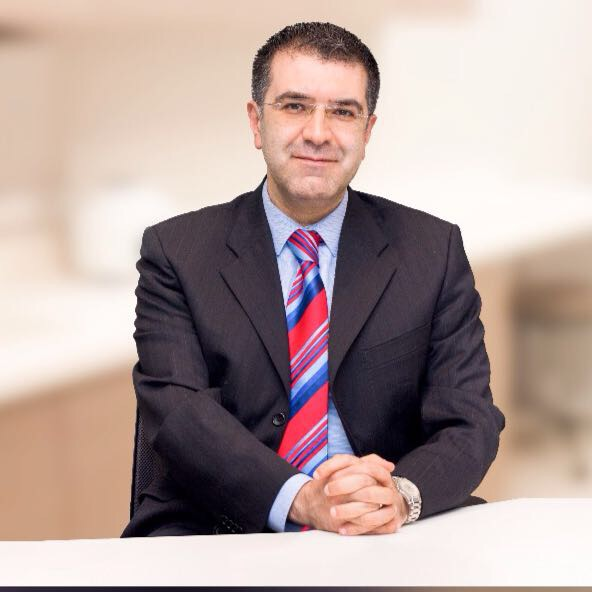
- Born: 2 March 1972; Istanbul, Turkey
- Education: Istanbul University
- Awards: Fellow of the Royal College of Physicians of Edinburgh; Fellow of the Royal College of Physicians of London; Fellow of the Royal College of Physicians of Ireland
- Scientific career
- Fields: Dermatology
- Workplaces: Istanbul Aydın University; Memorial Bahcelievler Hospital; Istanbul Kemerburgaz University
- Website: www.gokhanokan.com

Gokhan Okan (born March 2, 1972) is a Turkish physician and author. He is European Board Certified Professor dermatologist (Skin and Venereal Diseases). He took part in 23rd World Congress of Dermatology which was conducted in Vancouver in the year 2015. For his work, he was inducted as a Fellow of the Royal College of Physicians of Edinburgh, of the Royal College of Physicians of Ireland, and of the Royal College of Physicians of London. He is also a tenure-track professor at Istanbul Aydın University.

== Education ==
Gokhan Okan was born on 2 March 1972 in Istanbul. He earned his medical degree from the Istanbul University Cerrahpasa Faculty of Medicine Cerrahpasa faculty of medicine in 1994. He completed his dermatology residency in 1998 at Istanbul University Istanbul Medical Faculty.

== Research and career ==
Okan worked as a research fellow for one year at the Cleveland Clinic, USA. He studied wound care after laser resurfacing. He participated in the clinical and research activities of the Cleveland Clinic Florida Dermatology Department, published several clinical research articles and conducted clinical research projects. His research interest has focused on psoriasis, vitiligo, rosacea, laser and dermatologic signs of systemic diseases and wound healing.

In April 2015, Okan published a popular book about dermatology, "Krem-Cilt Sağlığının ABC'si" ("Cream: The ABC's of Skin Care"). The book reflects day-to-day clinical experience and direct knowledge of cutting edge advances, advising people to choose cosmetic products carefully, and to maintain proper nutrition and hydration. He particularly advises parsley, nettle, chamomile, ginseng, thyme, melon, broccoli, and carrot, as well as Vitamin A, Vitamin B3, Vitamin C, Vitamin D, Vitamin K, Vitamin H, zinc and iron. In other media, Okan has also deemed a good-quality sunscreen to be the best defense against aging. Later in 2015, he participated in 23rd World Congress of Dermatology, in Vancouver.

Okan is a European Board Certified dermatologist and passed the Specialty Certificate Examination (SCE) in Dermatology in the UK. In October 2016, he was selected as a "full member" of the Royal College of Physicians of Edinburgh, one of only a handful of Turkish nationals to receive that honor, marked by a ceremony in which Okan's membership diploma was bestowed upon him by then-President of the Royal College, and later director of the National Institute for Health Research, Derek Bell. In November 2020, he was awarded an FRCP from the Royal College of Physicians of London, and in January 2021 awarded an FRCP from the Royal College of Physicians of Ireland.

In his early days, he started his career as a dermatologist at Acibadem Bakirkoy Hospital and later worked Medical Park Hospital and Memorial Bahcelievler Hospital as an associate professor and also as a skin diseases specialist. He founded and chaired the Dermatology Department at Istanbul Kemerburgaz University in 2013. He volunteered with Health Volunteers Overseas as part of the Dermatology program at Preah Kossamak Hospital, Phnom Penh, Cambodia. He assisted in the training of dermatology students, provided continuing education regarding current and new trends of dermatologic diagnosis and treatment and provided training to nurses and physicians involved in dermatologic care.

In 2021, Okan and his team reported their findings that psoriasis patients had unusually high levels of neurofilament and Tau protein, which act as a skeleton in the nerve cells in these patients. These levels were higher than those of non-sick individuals, especially when compared to the levels of those with severe psoriasis under the age of 40.

In 2023, Okan received his re-certification from the Turkish Dermatology Association, a qualification he held since 2014. He was also promoted to full professor at Istanbul Aydin University where he continues his clinical work as a tenure-track professor. Okan has also taught educational seminars for students under the Scientific and Technological Research Council of Turkey.

== Awards and honors ==
Okan won the Publication Incentive Award for his work. In addition to his election to the fellowship of the Royal Colleges of Physicians of Edinburgh, Ireland and London; his memberships include the Turkish Society of Dermatology, American Society of Dermatology, Health Volunteers Overseas, and European Academy of Dermatology and Venereology.

== Publications ==
Okan has published several articles in many leading journals. Some of his notable contributions are:

- Gokhan Okan, Can Baykal, Rifkiye Sarica. "Childhood bullous pemphigoid developed after the first vaccination." Journal of Dermatological Treatment
- Gokhan Okan, Pervin Vural. "Worsening of the vitiligo following the second dose of the BNT162B2 mRNA COVID‐19 vaccine." Journal of Dermatological Treatment
- Gokhan Okan, Adile Merve Baki, Eda Yorulmaz, Semra Doğru‐Abbasoğlu, and Pervin Vural. "Serum Visfatin, Fetuin‐A, and Pentraxin 3 Levels in Patients with Psoriasis and Their Relation to Disease Severity". Journal of clinical laboratory analysis.
- Gokhan Okan, and Halil Ibrahim Canter. "Nicolau syndrome and perforator vessels: a new viewpoint for an old problem". Journal of Cutaneous and Ocular Toxicology.
- Gokhan Okan, and Can Baykal. "Nevoid hyperkeratosis of the nipple and areola: treatment with topical retinoic acid". Journal of the European Academy of Dermatology and Venereology.
- Gokhan Okan, Serpil Yaylaci, Onder Peker, Sabahattin Kaymakoglu, and Murat Saruc. "Vanishing bile duct and Stevens-Johnson syndrome associated with ciprofloxacin treated with tacrolimus". World Journal of gastroenterology.
- Can Baykal, Gökhan Okan, and Rifkiye Sarica. "Childhood bullous pemphigoid developed after the first vaccination". Journal of the American Academy of Dermatology.
- Gökhan Okan, "Atopik dermatitin baş boyun lokalizasyonlarında pityrosporum ovalenin rolü". ("The role of pityrosporum ovalen in head and neck localization of atopic dermatitis.")
- Gokhan Okan, Adile Merve Baki, Eda Yorulmaz, Semra Dogru-Abbasoglu, Pervin vural. A preliminary study about neurofilament light chain and tau protein levels in psoriasis: Correlation with disease severity. Journal of Clinical Laboratory Analysis
