= Ayşegül Behlivan =

Turkish martial artist

- Born: October 10, 1989 (age 36); MERSİN/TARSUS
- Nationality: Turkish
- Height: 165 cm (5 ft 5 in)
- Weight: 51 kg (112 lb)
- Division: 51-54 kg (Muay Thai), 52 kg /Wushu)
- Style: Muay Thai, Wushu
- Team: NATİONAL TEAM
- Trainer: HASAN YILDIZ, FİKRİ ARICAN
- Rank: national sport
- Years active: 10 (ten)

Other information
- University: MERSİN UNIVERSITY
- Spouse: Physical education and sports teacher
- Notable club: ARİCAN FİGHT CLUB

Ayşegül Behlivan
Medal record

Representing Turkey

Women's Muay Thai

World Championships
Bronze medal – third place	2008 Busan	51 kg

European Championships
Silver medal – second place	2009 Liepāja	51 kg

Women's Wushu - Sanshou

World Championships
Bronze medal – third place	2009 Toronto	52 kg

World Cup
Bronze medal – third place	2010 Chongqing	52 kg

World Combat Games
Silver medal – second place	2010 Beijing	52 kg

Ayşegül Behlivan is a Turkish female Muay Thai and wushu practitioner.

== Achievements ==
Muay Thai

- Bronze (51 kg) 2008 World Muay Thai Championships - September 26-October 2, 2008, Busan, South Korea
- Gold (51 kg) 2009 National Muay Thai Championships - April 15–19, 2009, Antalya, Turkey
- Silver (51 kg) 2009 European Muay Thai Championships - May 15–22, 2009, Liepāja, Latvia

Wushu

- Silver (52 kg) 2008 National Wushu Championships - July 17–20, 2008, Ordu, Turkey
- Gold (52 kg) 2009 National Wushu Championships - July 24–26, 2009, Safranbolu, Turkey
- Gold (52 kg) 2004 National Wushu Championships-TRABZON-TURKEY
- Bronze (52 kg) 10th World Wushu Championships - October 25–29, 2009, Toronto, Ontario, Canada
- Silver (52 kg) 1st World Combat Games - August 26-September 4, 2010, Beijing, China
- Bronze (52 kg) 5th Sanda World Cup - December 16–18, 2010, Chongqing, China

2011 MUAY THAİ EUROPEAN CUP- LATVİA 54 KG.GOLD MEDAL.. 2010 5TH WUSHU WORLD CUP (CHINA/Çongçing).. 2010 COMBAT GAMES WU SHU 2.(CHINA7BEİJİNG).. 2009 MUAY THAİ EUROPEAN CHAMPİONSHİP 2.(LATVİA).. 2009 WORLD WUSHU CHAMPİONSHİP 52 KG 3.(CANADA/TORONTO).. 2009 AKA KİCK BOKS EUROPEAN CHAMPİONSHİP 1.(ENGLAND).. 2008 AKA EUROPEAN CHAMPİON (ENGLAND/LONDON).. 2008 WORLD MUAY THAİ CHAMPİONSHİP 51 KG. 3.(G.KORE/BUSAN).. 2008 OPEN US MUAY THAİ 2.(AMERİCA/FL.MİAMİ).. 2008 MUAY THAİ PROF. 1.(SURİYE).. 2007 MUAY THAİ 1.(AMERİCA/CHİCAGO).. 2007 AKA AVRUPA 2.(ENGLAND).. 2007 IMC MUAY THAİ PROFİ 2.(GREECE).. 2004 MUAY THAİ KİNGS CUP. (THAİLAND/BANGKOK).. 2010-2009-2008-2006-2005-2004 WUSHU NATİONAL CHAMPİON.. 2009-2008-2006-2005-2003 MUAY THAİ NATİONAL CHAMPİON..
