= Luis Cetin =

Brazilian footballer

Personal information
- Full name: Luis Gustavo Cetin
- Date of birth: August 5, 1987 (age 39)
- Place of birth: Limeira, Brazil
- Height: 1.91 m (6 ft 3 in)
- Position: Goalkeeper

Team information
- Current team: Boa

Youth career
- 2006: Fluminense

Senior career*
Years	Team	Apps	(Gls)
2007–2010	Fluminense		
2009	→ America (loan)		
2010	→ Anapolina (loan)		
2011	Villa Nova	5	(0)
2012	Volta Redonda		
2012	Ceará	0	(0)
2013–	Boa		
- * Club domestic league appearances and goals

Luis Gustavo Cetin (born August 5, 1987) is a Brazilian professional footballer who plays as a goalkeeper for Boa.
