= Süleyman Memnun =

Turkish motorcycle racer (born 1958)

- Nationality: (Turkey) Turkish
- Born: 15 July 1958 (age 68); Yugoslavia
- Website: www.suleymanmemnun.com

Süleyman Memnun (born 15 July 1958 in Yugoslavia) is a Turkish motorcycle racer.

Memnun started his racing career in 1977 as a motocross racer. He was the first Turkish rider in Tunisia, Dubai rallies in 1996, 1997 and 1998. Memnun has won 11 motocross championships in the 125 cc and 250 cc categories. He started his motorcycle Grand Prix career in 1994. He was 1995 Turkey Champion in 125 cc and 1996–1997 Turkey Champion in 600 cc. In Balkans Supersport Championship, he was 1999 and 2000 champion in 600 cc.

Memnun later became vice chairman, and elected in 2009 chairman of the Turkish Motorcycling Federation.
