= Uğur Gürses =

Turkish journalist

Uğur Gürses is a Turkish financial columnist. He has written financial and economic articles for daily Radikal newspaper.
