= Sabri Kaliç =

Turkish film director, experimental filmmaker, writer and translator (1966-2012)

Sabri Kaliç (May 19, 1966 – September 23, 2012) is a Turkish film director, experimental filmmaker, writer and translator.

== Biography ==
Kaliç was born on May 19, 1966 in İzmir. After receiving his BFA in film directing from the Dokuz Eylül University in Izmir, he moved to Istanbul in 1992. Having worked with Turkish film director Sinan Çetin as an assistant for a while, he made his TV film debut with Midnight Hitchhiker in 1995. He also translated screenplays from English, including that of Trainspotting.

He died on September 23, 2012 in İzmir.

== Filmography ==
- A Fassbinder Lie – 1987 (1/24 second {1 frame!}, 16 mm., b/w), supposedly the world's shortest film
- PO"y"EM – 1987 (4 seconds, 16 mm., b/w)
- Not The Longest Film You Will Ever See, But... – 1987 (1 second, 16 mm., b/w)
- 59" – 1987 (59 seconds, 16 mm., b/w)
- Bolero – 1990 (17 min., VHS, color)
- Das ist Eine Video-Kunst – 1991 (13 min., VHS, color)
- Keine Kunst Bitte – 1991 (9 min., VHS, color)
- Douche Opera – 1992 (5 min., VHS, color)
- Midnight Hitchhiker – 1995 (87 min, BETACAM, color)
- The Spider Web – 1998 (92 min., BETACAM, color)
- Sabri Kaliç : CV- 2000 (27 min., BETACAM, color)
- Midnight Stories – 2000 (85 min., BETACAM, color)
- Non – 2002 (no color, no format)
- Stories From Beyond – 2005 (62 min., BETACAM, color)
- Stories From Beyond -II – 2005 (59 min., BETACAM, color)

== Awards ==
- 1987 Ankara Film Festival Invitation
- 1992 Adana Student Films Festival Invitation
- 1992 A Concise History of Experimental Film – Turkish Ministry of Culture "Cinema Book of the Year" Award
- 1996 Moths Towards The Fire – Turkish Ministry of Culture "Script of the Year" Award
- 1996 Spaghetti With Yogurt – Orhon Murat Ariburnu "Best Film Story" Award
- 2005 Meta-Film Award – Experimental Film Award delivered by Meta-Film Underground, Holland
- 2010 The Monk and The Butterfly – Screenplay Writing Fund for the film story
