= Onur Demirsoy =

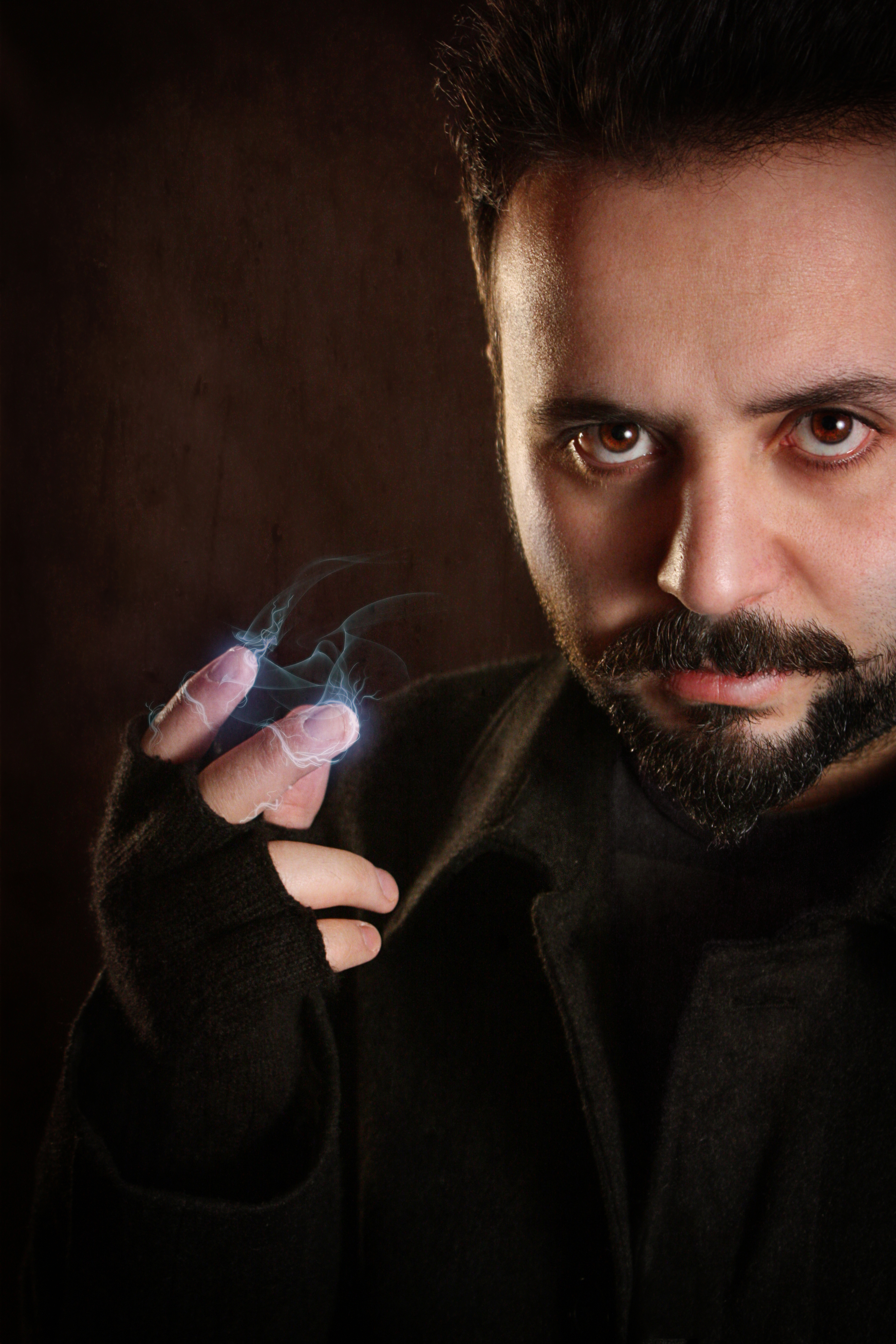
- Onur Demirsoy, Turkish digital creative artist.
- Born: 11 July 1981; Ankara, Turkey
- Occupation: Cartoonist

Onur Demirsoy (born July 11, 1981, Ankara, Turkey) is the animation director and one of the cartoonists of the humour web site Grafi2000.

== Biography ==
Onur Demirsoy was born in 1981 in Ankara. He completed primary and middle school in TED Ankara College, high school in Ankara Cumhuriyet High School and university in Ankara University, Astronomy and Space Sciences Department. His weekly animations appeared in one of Turkey's biggest comedy websites, Grafi2000, under the name Hombulu in 1999. The same year he took 2nd place in Security General Directorate's comics contest. He took several roles and duties in the preparation of Grafi2000 Comedy, Koca Kafalar, Pembe ve Mavi for Kanal D, Harbi Tivi for Atv, Acar Kafadarlar for the Turkish National Television, TRT. He also drew daily comics for newspaper Hurriyet with sponsorship from Kale Locks. He prepared TV commercials for newspaper Aksam, No Fear and Alfemo Furniture Company. In 2009, Google announced him as one of the 4 designers that they got their inspiration from for designing their fav icon. In 2011, he got the 2nd most votes for the comics contest “The World is Looking for its Super Hero” organized by Talenthouse and Stan Lee Foundation. Same year he started to produce iPhone and iPad software under his own name.

== Projects He Was Involved In ==
(alphabetically ordered)

- Advis Web Site Animations,
- Aksam Newspaper TV Commercials,
- Alem Fm TV Commercials,
- Alfemo "Ellisi" TV Commercials,
- Alfemo "Messenger" TV Commercials,
- Atmosphere Project Promo Animation,
- Atv “Akademi Turkiye” TV Show Animations,
- Atv “Harbi Tivi” TV Show Animations,
- Autokinder.com Web Site Cartoon Designs,
- Bolluca Koyu Logo Design,
- Business Object Comics,
- Cepmaster Cell Phone Logo and Multimedia Messages Design and Animation,
- Cine5 “Baska Yerde Yok” TV Show Animation,
- CNN Turk “5N1K” TV Show Animation,
- Condomi Internet Promotion Comics,
- Corlu Park Commercial Cartoons,
- Delete Chewing Gums Internet Commercial Movie,
- Dream TV “Koca Kafalar” TV Show Animation,
- FELIS Rock Band's Promo-Digipack, Poster Designs,
- Fireball Ultimate Computers Magazine Promo Designs,
- Fox TV "Beni Halk Secti" TV Show Animations,
- Gazi University “Iyi Fikir Odulleri” Award Ceremony Intro,
- G.O.R.A. The Movie's Cell Phone Games,
- Grafi2000.Com Web Site Animations,
- Hurriyet Newspaper "Kalemino" Daily Cartoons,
- KanalD “Baba Haber Bülteni” TV Show Animations,
- KanalD “Bizim Mucitler” TV Show Animations,
- KanalD “Cocuk Kulubu” TV Animations,
- KanalD “Dobra Dobra” TV Animations,
- KanalD “Grafi2000.Comedy” TV Show,
- KanalD “Haneler” TV Show Intro Animation,
- KanalD “Koca Kafalar TV” TV Show,
- KanalD “Pembe ve Mavi” Weekly Cartoon,
- Longman Book Designs and Cartoons,
- MAYA College Educational Kids Books Picture Designs,
- Milliyet Newspaper TV Commercials,
- Modern Sabahlar Poster Designs,
- No Fear Commercial,
- Rimaks Company Educational Animations,
- Rock’n Coke 2005 Rock Festival Interactive Animation
  Practice,
- Sabanci Group Herbal Oil 2004 Promo Commercials and Comics,
- Show TV “Carkifelek” TV Show, Press Media Picture Perfect,
- Sky Turk “Irak Belgeseli” Animation,
- STAR TV "Son Utucu" TV Show Animations,
- Superonline Web Site E-cards,
- Superonline “Klik Film” Web Site Animations,
- Ticaretmerkezi.com.tr Web Promo Animations,
- TREND Magazine Comics,
- TRT “Asure” TV Show Animations,
- TRT “Ajan Naber” TV Show Animations,
- TRT “Ben Istersem" TV Show Decoration Design,
- TRT “Okudukca” TV Animations,
- Turkcell Cell Phone Logos,
- Tv8 “Cihat Sener” TV Show Animations,
- Wing Travel Fly Concept TV Commercial

== Awards ==
- Demirsoy won 2nd place in a comic contest organized by The National Police Department in 1999 themed "Terror and Fighting Terror".
- In 2004, the comedy and animation show Grafi2000 ComEdy -which he was a crew of as the animation director, cartoon artist, animator and writer- that was aired on Kanal D in 2004 won 2004s best comedy show reward, determined by public votes
- Same year, the program won " The Best Youth Tv Program" distributed by Kultur College.
- In 2004, the shows comedy based web site -which he is actively working as an animator- www.grafi2000.com won 1st place in "The Best Humour Web-Site Reward" in 2004 Golden Spider Web Rewards.
