= Recep Uslu =

Turkish writer and researcher on Turkish musicology

Recep Uslu is a Turkish writer and researcher on Turkish musicology.

== Bibliography ==
His some books and articles:

- [1. Mehmed Hafid Efendi and Music (2001),]
- [2. Musicians in the Ottoman and Central Asia in the 15th Century According to an unknown work, in The Great Ottoman Turkish Civilization, Ankara 2000, vol. IV, pp. 548–555]
- [3. Music in Fatih Era, in Atlas of Turkish culture, Istanbul 2002]
- [4. Musicology and his sources in Turkey (2006),]
- [5. Mehmet II and music in his court (2007),]
- [6. Ruhperver, Istanbul 2009, with Sureyya Agayeva]
- [7. A Violanist in the Ottoman Court, Istanbul 2010]
