= Tayfun Seven =

Turkish footballer

Personal information
- Full name: Tayfun Seven
- Date of birth: 25 June 1980 (age 46)
- Place of birth: Üsküdar, Istanbul, Turkey
- Height: 1.79 m (5 ft 10 in)
- Positions: Central midfielder; left midfielder

Youth career
- 1994–1998: Fenerbahçe

Senior career*
Years	Team	Apps	(Gls)
1998–2004	Bursaspor	86	(3)
2004–2005	Gençlerbirliği	3	(0)
2005–2006	Antalyaspor	16	(0)
2006	Konyaspor	9	(1)
2006–2008	İstanbul BB	23	(0)
2008	Malatyaspor	15	(2)
2008–2009	Boluspor	28	(2)
2009–2010	Kartalspor	26	(1)
2010–2011	Altay	25	(0)
2011–2012	Adana Demirspor	14	(0)
2012	Turgutluspor	15	(0)
2012–2013	Alanyaspor	29	(0)
2013–2014	Diyarbakır BB	20	(0)
2014–2015	68 Yeni Aksarayspor	3	(0)

International career
1998	Turkey U17	7	(1)
1998	Turkey U18	12	(2)
1999	Turkey U19	3	(1)
2000–2001	Turkey U21	19	(1)
- * Club domestic league appearances and goals as of 20 September 2015

Tayfun Seven (born 25 June 1980) is a Turkish footballer who last played for the TFF Third League club 68 Yeni Aksarayspor as a forward or as an attacking midfielder. Seven played in the Süper Lig with Bursaspor, Gençlerbirliği S.K. and Konyaspor.
