= Aytaç Özkul =

Turkish basketball player (born 1989)

Aytaç Özkul (born 9 September 1989 in Turkey) is a Turkish professional basketball player of Fenerbahçe who is loaned to Fenerbahçe's second team Alpella. The center is 2.10 m tall.

== Career ==
- Fenerbahçe
- Alpella

== International career ==
AytaÖzkul is a regular Turkey National U21 Team player.

== Vital statistics ==
- Position: Center
- Height: 2.10 m
- Team: Alpella (loan from Fenerbahçe)
