= List of Turkish academics =

Below is a list of notable Turkish academics.

== A ==
- Daron Acemoğlu
- Tülay Adalı
- Halide Edib Adıvar
- Erhan Afyoncu
- Mehmet Aga-Oglu
- Zeynep Ahunbay
- Şükrü Halûk Akalın
- Ali Akansu
- Selman Akbulut
- Taner Akçam
- Ali Akdemir
- Yalçın Akdoğan
- Mustafa Akgül
- Derya Akkaynak
- Fevzi Aksoy
- Muammer Aksoy
- İrşadi Aksun
- Ekrem Akurgal
- Mete Akyol
- Türkan Akyol
- Fikri Alican
- Ahmet Alkan
- Ahmet Vefik Alp
- Sedat Alp
- Mehmet Altan
- İhsan Oktay Anar
- Oya Araslı
- Cahit Arf
- Erdal Arıkan
- Engin Arık
- Attila Aşkar
- Tomur Atagök
- Abdullah Atalar
- Toktamış Ateş
- Mehmet Aydın
- Mustafa Aydın
- Lale Aytaman
- Orhan Aytür

== B ==
- Özalp Babaoğlu
- Ali Bardakoğlu
- Aykut Barka
- Asım Orhan Barut
- Tamer Başar
- Süheyl Batum
- Deniz Baykal
- Turhan Baytop
- Murat Belge
- Nihat Berker
- Halil Berktay
- Behice Boran
- Korkut Boratav
- Naci Bostancı
- Metin Boşnak
- Aydın Boysan
- Ali Bozer
- Erdoğan Büyükkasap

== C, Ç ==
- Simten Cosar
- Muazzez İlmiye Çığ
- Ümit Cizre
- Tansu Çiller
- Abdullah Cevdet
- Fikri Cantürk
- Halet Çambel
- Celal Şengör

== D ==
- Canan Dağdeviren
- Ahmet Davutoğlu
- Vedat Demir
- Tekin Dereli
- Selim Deringil
- Ömer Diler
- Güzin Dino
- İhsan Doğramacı
- Burhanettin Duran

== E ==
- Volkan Ş. Ediger
- Ekrem Buğra Ekinci
- Nazım Ekren
- Osman Nuri Eralp
- Necmettin Erbakan
- Aytül Erçil
- Kayhan Erciyeş
- Ali Erdemir
- Nevnihal Erdoğan
- Turhan Erdoğan
- Tunç Erem
- Kazım Ergin
- Ahmed Cemal Eringen
- Elza Erkip
- Veysel Eroğlu
- Okan Ersoy
- Uğur Ersoy
- Semavi Eyice

== F ==
- Metin Feyzioğlu
- Turhan Feyzioğlu

== G ==
- Erol Gelenbe
- Mehmet Görmez
- Kemal Gözükara
- Nermin Gözükırmızı
- Birgül Ayman Güler
- Nuriye Gülmen
- Erol Güngör
- Levent Gürel
- Aydın Güven Gürkan
- Feza Gürsey
- Reşit Süreyya Gürsey
- Yaprak Gürsoy

== H ==
- Yusuf Halaçoğlu
- Talât Sait Halman
- M. Şükrü Hanioğlu
- Remziye Hisar

== I, İ ==
- Ahmet Mete Işıkara
- Ekmeleddin İhsanoğlu
- Ataç İmamoğlu
- Afet İnan
- Mustafa İnan
- Umran İnan
- Kemal Inat
- Erdal İnönü
- Bülent İplikçioğlu
- Emrullah İşler

== K ==
- Bedri Karafakıoğlu
- Atilla Karaosmanoğlu
- Fuat Köprülü
- Behram Kurşunoğlu
- Şule Kut

== M ==
- Seha Meray
- Janet Akyüz Mattei
- Uğur Mumcu

== N ==
- Nesrin Nas
- Salih Neftçi
- Leyla Neyzi

== O, Ö ==
- F. Tulga Ocak
- Sıddık Sami Onar
- Lale Orta
- İlber Ortaylı
- Ekmel Özbay
- Hasan Özbekhan
- Tahsin Özgüç
- Yaşar Nuri Öztürk

== P ==
- Necla Pur

== R ==
- Oskar Rescher
- Nükhet Ruacan

== S, Ş ==
- Aziz Sancar
- Aydın Sayılı
- Türkan Saylan
- Oktay Sinanoğlu
- Tarık Galip Somer
- Halil Mete Soner
- Ayşe Soysal
- Ibrahim Sirkeci
- Mümtaz Soysal
- B. Mutlu Sumer
- Elif Şafak
- Celâl Şengör
- Hikmet Şimşek
- Mehmet Şimşek
- Ahmet Şimşirgil

== T ==
- Hikmet Tanyu
- Tosun Terzioğlu
- Semih Tezcan
- Erdoğan Teziç
- Beğlan Birand Toğrol
- Mehmet Toner
- Hıfzı Topuz
- İlter Turan
- Cavit Orhan Tütengil

== U, Ü ==
- Galip Ulsoy
- Bilge Umar
- Nermin Abadan Unat
- Bahriye Üçok
- Besim Üstünel

== Y ==
- Nur Yalman
- Serap Yazıcı
- K. Aslihan Yener
- Hatice Duran Yildiz, physicist
