= Turkish women academics =

Overview Article of the Wikipedia

Turkish women in academics refers to Turkish women who make scientific research or teach in the universities in Turkey and abroad.

== Background ==
During the Ottoman Empire era women had no chance to teach in the universities except for the very last years of the empire when Committee of Union and Progress (İttihat ve Terakki Partisi) came to power. The first Turkish woman who was able to teach in Istanbul University (then known as Darülfunun) was Halide Edib (later Halide Edib Adıvar) in 1918. But Halide Edib chose to join the nationalist forces of Mustafa Kemal (later Atatürk) in Anatolia rather than to stay in Istanbul. During the Republican era the number of academics increased.

== Present situation ==
During the opening ceremony of 4th International Congress of Women Rectors in 2010, Gülsün Sağlamer, the chairperson of the organization committee, said that the percentage of women professors in Turkey was 27% and this percentage was higher than most other countries. She added that the percentage of women rectors however was only 10 out of 168 and this percentage needed to be increased. Since then, the number of women professors has been on the rise and in the 2011-2012 academic year, the number of Turkish women professors increased to 4729, which corresponds to 28%. Including other titles however (such as associate professor, instructor etc.) the percentage is much higher. According to Times Higher Education a survey carried by Thomson-Reuters reveals that the percentage of female academics is 47.5% which is one of the highest in the world.

== List of some academics ==
- Afet İnan
- Asuman Özdağlar
- Aysel Ekşi
- Ayşe Erzan
- Ayşe Soysal
- Bahriye Üçok
- Behice Boran
- Betül Kaçar
- Bilge Yıldız
- Birgül Ayman Güler
- Canan Dağdeviren
- Derya Akkaynak
- Elza Erkip
- Feryal Özel
- F. Tulga Ocak
- Gülsün Sağlamer
- Güzin Dino
- Halet Çambel
- Halide Edib Adıvar
- Ioanna Kuçuradi
- Janet Akyüz Mattei
- Lale Aytaman
- Lale Orta
- Leyla Neyzi
- Muazzez İlmiye Çığ
- Naşide Gözde Durmuş
- Necla Pur
- Nermin Abadan Unat
- Nesrin Nas
- Nur Serter
- Nükhet Ruacan
- Pakize Tarzi
- Paris Pişmiş
- Remziye Hisar
- Tansu Çiller
- Tülay Adalı
- Türkan Akyol
- Türkan Saylan
- Saffet Rıza Alpar
- Serap Yazıcı
- Şule Kut
- Zeynep Ahunbay
- Zeynep Çelik-Butler

== See also ==
- Education in Turkey
