= Pur =

Pur or PUR may refer to:

== Arts, entertainment, and media ==
- Pur (band), a German band
- Pur, a song by the Cocteau Twins

== People ==
- Necla Pur (born 1943), Turkish economist and professor
- Quraish Pur (1932–2013), Pakistani scholar, writer, and television host

== Places ==
=== Villages ===
- Pur, Belgaum, Karnataka, India, a village
- Pur, Bhiwani, Haryana, India, a village
- Pur, Bhilwara, Rajasthan, India, a village
- Pur, Iran, a village

=== Rivers ===
- Pur (Russia), a river in Yamalo-Nenets, Russia
- Pur River (India), a river Gujarat, India

== Transport ==
- Purley railway station, London, England (National Rail station code)

== Other uses ==
- Pur (brand), a brand of water filters
- PUR Energy, an Indian company
- Pur (placename element), placename suffix used in South Asia
- Pacific Union Recorder, see List of Seventh-day Adventist periodicals
- Partidul Umanist Român (Romanian Humanist Party), former name of the Conservative Party (Romania)
- Polyurethane, a polymeric material
- Puerto Rico, IOC country code PUR

== See also ==
- Puri (disambiguation), alternative of the place name element
- Purr, a sound made by felines
