= Ekonomist =

Ekonomist may refer to:

- Ekonomist (Turkey), a Turkish-language business magazine
- Ekonomist (magazine), a Montenegrin online business magazine
- ŽFK Ekonomist, a Montenegrin football club

== See also ==
- Economist, a person who studies economics
- The Economist, a weekly newspaper
