= Öktem =

Öktem is a Turkish male given name and a surname. It may refer to:

- Niyazi Öktem (born 1944), Turkish academic
- Tankut Öktem (1940-2007), Turkish sculptor
- Zehra Öktem (born 1959), Turkish female archer
- Kerem Öktem, Turkish contemporary historian
