= Serap =

Serap is a common Turkish given name. In Turkish, the word serap refers to an optical illusion, commonly known as a "mirage". It describes a phenomenon where distant objects, especially in the desert or on hot roads, appear to be distorted or surrounded by water.

== People ==
=== Given name ===
- Serap Aktaş (born 1971), Turkish middle and long-distance runner
- Serap Güler (born 1980), German politician
- Serap Özçelik (born 1988), Turkish karateka
- Serap Yazıcı (born 1963), Turkish academic
- Serap Yücesir (born 1973), Turkish basketball player

== Other uses ==
- Serap (vaccine), a trade name for a diphtheria, pertussis (whooping cough), and tetanus vaccine
