= Rona Serozan =

Turkish professor of law (1942–2018)

- Born: 15 June 1942; Istanbul, Turkey
- Died: 6 November 2018 (aged 76); Istanbul, Turkey
- Education: Istanbul University; Tübingen University Faculty of Law
- Occupations: University professor; lawyer; writer

Ahmet Rona Serozan (15 June 1942 – 6 November 2018) was a Turkish jurist, university professor of civil law, lawyer and writer.

== Early life ==
Ahmet Rona Serozan was born to Sami and Maide Serozan in a wealthy family in Istanbul, Turkey on 15 June 1942. His father was a textile engineer and interpreneur in yarn manufacturing. He had a brother, Engin Serozan.

He graduated from faculty of law at Istanbul University in 1964. He then went to West Germany, where he earned a Ph.D. degree magna cum laude at Tübingen University Faculty of Law in 1967. His doctoral thesis on "Die Überwindung der Rechtsfolgen des Formmangels im Rechtsgeschäft nach deutschem, schweizerischem und türkischem Recht" ("Overcoming the legal consequences of the lack of form in legal transactions under German, Swiss and Turkish law") was published as a book by Mohr Siebeck Verlag in Germany the next year.

== Career ==
In April 1974, he became associate professor at Istanbul University with a habilitation thesis on "Sözleşmeden Dönme". After his application for full professorship at the same university did not succeed due to a formality, he worked as a lawyer between 1982 and 1988. With the decision of Council of State, he was appointed full professor of civil law at Istanbul University in 1991. Serozan retired drom his post at Istanbul University in June 2009, and took a full professor post at Istanbul Bilgi University serving there until his death.

Serozan authored many textbooks in the field of civil law and translated books on Fascism, Capitalism and State law from German language.

== Death ==
Rona Serozan died at the age of 76 in Istanbul on 6 November 2018. He was buried following a memorial ceremony held at Istanbul University's faculty of law and the religious funeral at Bebek Mosque.

== Works ==
1. Serozan, Rona (1 January 1968). Die Überwindung der Rechtsfolgen des Formmangels im Rechtsgeschäft nach deutschem, schweizerischem und türkischem Recht (in German). Mohr Siebeck. ASIN B0000BUO4A.
2. Thalheimer, August; Otto Bauer (1 September 1999). Faşizm ve Kapitalizm [Faschismus und Kapitalismus] (in Turkish). Translated by Rona Serozan (2nd ed.). Sarmal Yayınları. p. 141. ISBN 978-9758304448.
3. Rona Serozan; Abdülkadir Arpacı; Mustafa Dural; Atilla Top; Nami Barlas, eds. (31 December 2004). Prof. Dr. Necip Kocayusufpaşaoğlu İçin Armağan (in Turkish) (1st ed.). Seçkin Yayıncılık. p. 784. ISBN 978-975-347-796-3.
4. Serozan, Rona (1 August 2007). Sözleşmeden Dönme (in Turkish) (1st ed.). Vedat Kitapçılık. p. 622. ISBN 978-975-887-594-8.
5. Serozan, Rona (1 January 2013). Medeni Hukuk - Genel Bölüm-Kişiler Hukuku (in Turkish) (4th ed.). Tutku Kelepir. p. 528. ISBN 978-605-482-301-7.
6. Serozan, Rona; Baki İlkay Engin (24 March 2014). Miras Hukuku (in Turkish) (4th ed.). Seçkin Yayıncılık. p. 816. ISBN 978-975-022-805-6.
7. Serozan, Rona; Başak Başoğlu (1 January 2015). Turkish Reports To The XIXth International Congress Of Comparative Law (in English and Turkish) (1st ed.). Vedat Kitapçılık. p. 168. ISBN 978-605-482-378-9.
8. Friedrich Engels, Karl Marx (20 January 2015). Devlet ve Hukuk Üzerine [Staat, Recht und Demokratie] (in Turkish). Translated by Serozan, Rona (1st ed.). Enki Yayınları. p. 120.
9. Serozan, Rona (17 October 2015). Hukukta Yöntem (in Turkish) (1st ed.). Vedat Kitapçılık. p. 155. ISBN 978-605-926-305-4.
10. Serozan, Rona (20 December 2016). Çocuk Hukuku (in Turkish) (2nd ed.). Vedat Kitapçılık. p. 324. ISBN 978-975-887-537-5.
11. Serozan, Rona (1 January 2017). Hukukta Yöntem - Mantık (in Turkish) (1st ed.). Vedat Kitapçılık. p. 193. ISBN 978-605-926-348-1.
12. Serozan, Rona (25 October 2017). Medeni Hukuk Pratik Çalışmaları - Genel Bölüm, Kişiler Hukuku, Aile Hukuku (in Turkish) (5th ed.). Vedat Kitapçılık. p. 370. ISBN 978-605-152-609-6.
13. Serozan, Rona (1 July 2018). Medeni Hukuk - Genel Bölüm / Kişiler Hukuku (in Turkish) (8th ed.). Vedat Kitapçılık. p. 526. ISBN 978-605-220-311-8.
14. Serozan, Rona; Kerem Cem Sanlı; Başak Baysal (22 January 2019). Borçlar Hukuku Özel Bölüm (in Turkish) (4th ed.). On İki Levha Yayınları. p. 345. ISBN 978-605-790-960-2.
15. Thalheimer, August; Otto Bauer; Arthur Rosenberg; Angelo Tasca (14 February 2019). Faşizm ve Kapitalizm - Faşizmin Sosyal Kökenleri ve - Fonksiyonu Üstüne Teoriler [Faschismus und Kapitalismus. Theorien über die sozialen Ursprünge und die Funktion des Faschismus] (in Turkish). Translated by Rona Serozan (2nd ed.). Ayrıntı Yayınları. p. 128. ISBN 978-605-314-258-4.
16. Serozan, Rona; Faruk Acar; Turgut Öz; Emre Gökyayla; Hüseyin Murat, eds. (1 August 2019). İstanbul Şerhi - Türk Borçlar Kanunu (in Turkish). Vol. 1–8 (3rd ed.). Vedat Kitapçılık. pp. 4, 451. ISBN 978-605-220-341-5.
