= Cantürk =

Cantürk is a surname, likely of Turkish origin. Notable people with the surname include:

- Behçet Cantürk (1950–1994), Kurdish mob boss
- Fikri Cantürk (born 1933), Turkish painter and professor
