= Zeynep Çelik =

Zeynep Çelik may refer to:

- Zeynep Çelik (judoka), a Turkish Paralympic judoka
- Zeynep Çelik (scholar), Turkish-born architect and architectural historian

== See also ==
- Zeynep Çelik-Butler, Turkish-American professor of electrical engineering
