= Ekrem Buğra Ekinci =

Turkish academic

- Born: 4 May 1966 (age 59); Ankara, Turkey
- Occupation: Academic

Ekrem Buğra Ekinci (born 4 May 1966) is a Turkish academic. He is a professor of history of Turkish law and Islamic Law. He is currently a member of the Faculty of Law of Marmara University.

Ekinci graduated from the Faculty of Law of Ankara University in 1987. He completed his lawyer apprenticeship in 1988 and gained his Master of Law degree in 1991. In 1996, he gained a degree of Doctor of Law (PhD) from the Faculty of Law of Istanbul University. In 1999, Ekinci became an associate professor of history of law by his dissertation on Ottoman courts. In 2005, he was appointed as a full professor.

Ekinci was a researcher in the University of Jordan in Amman between 1992 and 1993. He worked at the faculties of law in Ankara and Erzincan. He speaks English and Arabic.

== Publications ==
- Ateş İstidâsı-İslâm-Osmanlı Hukukunda Mahkeme Kararlarının Kontrolü (Appeal in Ottoman Law), Filiz Kitabevi, Istanbul 2001, XVI+293 p.
- İslâm Hukuku ve Önceki Şeriatler (Islamic Law and the Laws of Previous Religions), Arı Sanat Yayınevi, Istanbul 2003, 336 p.
- Osmanlı Mahkemeleri (Ottoman Courts), Arı Sanat Yayınevi, Istanbul 2004, 383 p.
- İslâm Hukukunda Değişmenin Sınırı (The Fundamentals of Change in Islamic Law), Arı Sanat Yayınevi, Istanbul 2005, 152 p.
- İslâm Hukuku (Islamic Law), Arı Sanat Yayınevi, Istanbul 2006, 216 p.
- İslâm Hukuku Tarihi (A History of Islamic Law), Arı Sanat Yayınevi, İstanbul 2006, 296 P.
- Karakoç Serkiz-Külliyât-ı Kavânîn Fihrist-i Târihî, Mehmet Akif Aydın, Mehmet Akman, Fethi Gedikli ve Macit Kenanoğlu ile beraber. 2 Volumes. Türk Tarih Kurumu, Ankara 2006. Volume 1: XII+584 p.; Volume 2.: 1022 p.
- Ahmed Cevdet Paşa ve Mecelle (Ahmed Cevdet Pasha and Mejelle), with Ahmet Şimşirgil, KTB Yayınları, Istanbul 2008, 176 p.
- Osmanlı Hukuku (Ottoman Law), Arı Sanat Yayınevi, Istanbul 2008, 600 p.
- Hukukun Serüveni (A Story of Law), Arı Sanat Yayınevi, Istanbul 2011, 568 p.

== See also ==
- List of Turkish academics
