= Espressolab =

Turkish Coffeehouse

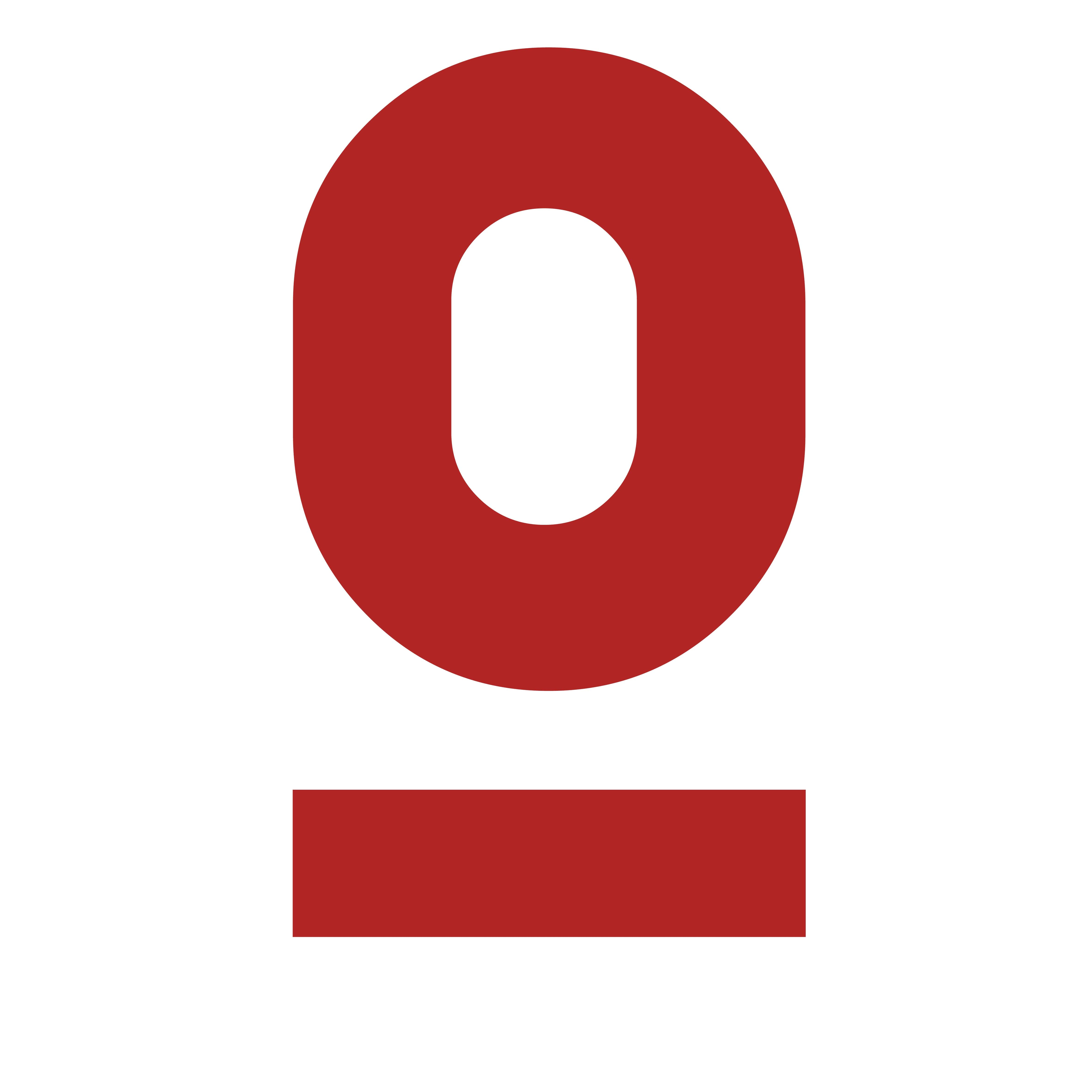
- Type: Private
- Founded: 2014
- Founder: Esat Kocadağ
- Number of locations: 150
- Area served: Turkey
- Products: Specialty coffee, Pastry
- Website: en.espressolab.com

Espressolab is a Turkish coffeehouse chain that opened its first location in 2014 at Istanbul Bilgi University. The company was founded by Esat Kocadağ.

Espressolab brand belongs to the Kocadağ Family Companies together with Emirgan Sütiş.

== History ==
Espressolab, a Turkish coffee chain, was founded in 2014 with its first store at Istanbul Bilgi University. Since then, it has expanded rapidly, becoming one of Turkey’s leading specialty coffee brands. The company emphasizes high-quality, freshly roasted coffee sourced from various regions, including Ethiopia, Colombia, and Brazil.

As of March 2024, there are 360 Espressolab stores including those abroad in Germany, Portugal, Egypt, Qatar, Jordan, Morocco, South Africa, the UAE, Cyprus, and Iraq. The chain has also made significant investments abroad, particularly in Africa, where it sees great potential for growth. This includes a partnership with the Moroccan Akwa Group, aiming to open 100 new stores and additional coffee corners in gas stations. The brand is also establishing itself in other regions, including Europe, the Middle East, and the U.S. It currently operates in countries such as South Africa, Jordan, Germany, Kosovo, and Qatar.

=== Boycott ===
After the arrest of Ekrem İmamoğlu in March 2025, Özgür Çelik, İstanbul Provincial Chair of the Republican People's Party (CHP), included Espressolab in a boycott list of companies perceived as aligned with the government. This followed a call by CHP leader Özgür Özel for citizens to boycott certain media groups and companies. In response, AK Party-affiliated groups and politicians expressed their support for Espressolab. The boycott follows public visits of high-profile AK Party politicians to the chain, which caused some members of the public to associate it with the ruling party. Espressolab issued a statement in response to the boycott, stating that "we don’t understand why we are being boycotted."
