= Aytül Erçil =

Turkish entrepreneur, CEO, and Professor of Computer Vision at Sabancı University

- Born: December 14, 1958 (age 67); Istanbul, Turkey
- Education: Robert College Boğaziçi University (BS) (1975-1979) Brown University Ph.D. Applied Mathematics

Aytül Erçil (born 14 December 1958) is a Turkish entrepreneur, CEO, and Professor of Computer Vision at Sabancı University in Istanbul. She was the founder of Vistek A.Ş. and a co-founder and CEO of Vispera.

== Biography ==
Aytül Erçil graduated from Robert College in 1975 and from Boğaziçi University in 1979 with a double degree in Electrical Engineering and Mathematics. She then obtained a master's degree in 1980 and a Ph.D. in 1983 at Brown University, both in Applied Mathematics. She worked at General Motors Research Laboratories from 1983 to 1988 as senior research scientist and staff research scientist and was a part-time faculty member at Wayne State University.

Upon returning to Turkey, she started teaching at Boğaziçi University's Department of Industrial Engineering in 1988, where she established BUPAM Pattern Analysis and Machine Vision Laboratory, and started her first company, Vistek Ltd. Vistek developed machine vision products like fig sorting machines, glass quality inspection systems, and olive sorting machines. In 2013, Vistek was acquired by ISRA VISION AG.

In 2001, she started teaching at the Electronics Engineering department at Sabancı University. She worked as the founding director of VPALAB Computer vision and Pattern Analysis Laboratory at Sabancı until 2013. Erçil co-founded Vispera A.Ş., an image processing/machine learning company, in 2014. Vispera is currently operating in 50 countries, developing solutions for retail execution and customer satisfaction.

Aytül Erçil is a member of the Arçelik International Advisory board, Allianz International Advisory board, Swiss Innovation Park advisory board, and of the joint scientific and industrial advisory board of European Machine Vision Association.

== Awards ==
- 2003: International Achievement award with the ‘Eureka ST Joseph 2000 Project’.
- 2003: Vistek A.Ş. received the Interpro R&D Award.
- 2004: Erçil's project "Eureka Pack 2000" was selected as a Eureka Success story
- 2004: VPALAB selected as a center of excellence by the European Union
- 2005: Woman Scientist of the Year by Yeşilköy Rotary Club
- 2010: Vistek A.Ş. was a finalist in the prestigious Technology Award
- 2011: Turkey's nominee for International Veuve Clicquot High Impact Female Entrepreneur of the Year Award
- 2012: First prize in Machines and Accessories Production Technologies Award
- 2013: Endeavor Entrepreneur
- 2013: Vistek A.Ş. listed in the Deloitte Technology Fast 50 (50 fastest growing technology companies)
- 2013: ‘Turkey’s Female Entrepreneur’ Award given by Kagider, Garanti BBVA and Ekonomist.
- 2013: ‘Crystal Tree Woman Entrepreneur of the Year’ Award
- 2014: ‘ANSIAD Academician of the Year’ Award
- 2015: “Microsoft Woman Leader in Information Technologies” Award
- 2019: Selçuk Yaşar “Entrepreneurship, Innovation” Award
- 2019: Vispera received "Startup of the Year Award" at the Ernst & Young Entrepreneur of the Year Award Ceremony
- 2020: "IWEC Business Award"
- 2020: "META Women in Tech Award"
- 2023: "IWF Women who make a Difference Award"
