= Mehmet Kamaç =

Turkish politician (born 1977)

Mehmet Kamaç (born 1977, Çatak, Turkey) is a politician of the Peoples' Equality and Democracy Party (DEM Party) and since June 2023 a member of the Grand National Assembly of Turkey

== Early life and education ==
Mehmet Kamaç was born in Çatak in the province of Van. He attended primary school in Van and completed high school in prison. In 1994, when he was seventeen years of age, he was arrested and imprisoned for seven years. After his release in 2000, he studied sociology at the Atatürk University in Erzurum.

== Political career ==
Mehmet Kamaç was involved in the human rights organizations Mazlumder and Insander, and founded the Human and Freedom Party (PIA) in 2018. For the Turkish elections of 2018, in which the party was not permitted to participate, his party supported the presidential campaign of Selahattin Demirtas. The PIA attempted for 2 years to become legally recognized as a party and Mehmet Kamaç also discussed the issue with politicians of the Peoples Democratic Party (HDP) but by May 2021, the PIA was still not recognized. Kamaç assumed it was because the Government did not want a party that represents Kurds. In the parliamentary election of May 2023, he was elected into the Grand National Assembly of Turkey representing Diyarbakir for the YSP.
