= Asaf Savaş Akat =

Turkish economist and academic (born 1943)

Asaf Savaş Akat (born 3 February 1943) is a Turkish economist and academic. He served as rector of Istanbul Bilgi University from 1996 to 1998, where he remains a professor.

== Early life and education ==
Akat attended Levent Primary School in Istanbul beginning in 1954. In 1961, he studied at Redondo Union High School in Redondo Beach, California, and in 1962 continued his secondary education at Galatasaray High School in Istanbul. During his high school years, he played the saxophone in the band Kafadarlar, formed by Barış Manço. He completed his undergraduate and doctoral studies at Istanbul University and earned a master's degree in economics from the University of East Anglia in 1968. He also undertook research studies at the London School of Economics.

== Career ==
He began his academic career in 1966 at Istanbul University Faculty of Economics, where he became a professor in 1980. In 1973, he became associate professor of economics at the same institution. During 1974–75, he was at National Security Academy, Istanbul, Turkey, as a member of teaching staff during military service. In 1980 he became professor of economics at Istanbul University. In 1982 he resigned from the Istanbul University Faculty of Economics.

In 1989, he was lecturer in economics at the Marmara University, Istanbul. In 1993, he was professor of economics at the Faculty of Economics of the Istanbul University. In 1994, he founded the academic board of the Istanbul School of International Studies. In 1996, he was the rector of Istanbul Bilgi University. In 1998, he became Professor of Economics at Istanbul Bilgi University. Until 2009, Akat was one of the faces of Ekodiyalog, a popular television program on economics.

On 28 September 2026, Akat has been awarded the title Emeritus Professor by Istanbul Bilgi University.

== Views ==
In one of his November 2011 columns in Vatan, titled as Monetary Politics and Financial Stability (in Turkish), Akat argued that developed countries led by the United States used to have a monopoly on economic theories and practises. Akat believes that the global crisis has changed this radically. Developing countries such as Turkey have begun to seize the initiative. “The fatwa of one global financial centre no longer applies,” he wrote. In his interview with ESI, Akat recalls the 1980s and 1990s when Turkey and its economy were not “on anyone’s map.” He talks about the Turkish economy's “miraculous transformation” in the last decade, about the pro-business and fiscally conservative AKP government, and the sustainability of the country's economic growth.

== Personal life ==
He is married to Nilüfer Göle a university professor and an authority on Muslim women's issues.

== Publications ==
He is the author of many publications and three books on economic issues. His latest, İktisadi Analiz (Economic Analysis), was published in 2009. In his paper The Political Economy of Turkish Inflation (2005) he researched inflation in Turkey in the 1980s and 1990s.
