= Erdoğan Teziç =

Turkish academic in constitutional law

- Born: 1936; Istanbul, Turkey
- Died: April 23, 2017 (aged 80–81); Istanbul
- Resting place: Aşiyan Asri Cemetery
- Citizenship: Turkish
- Education: University of Paris; Istanbul University; Galatasaray High School
- Awards: Ordre national du Mérite; Docteur Honoris Causa (Sorbonne)
- Scientific career
- Fields: Constitutional law

Erdoğan Teziç (1936 – 23 April 2017) was a Turkish academic in constitutional law.

== Early life ==
He was born in Istanbul. He graduated from Galatasaray High School in 1955 and Law school of Istanbul University in 1959. He traveled to Paris, France for doctorate studies.

During his youth, he was a volleyball player. He played in Galatasaray SK and he also participated in the matches of the Turkey men's national volleyball team. In 1958, he was the captain of Turkish team in the European championship held in Prague. During his years in Paris he also played in Paris Université Club. In his later years he served in the law office of European Volleyball Confederation.

== University years ==
After his years in Paris he became an academic at Istanbul University. But after the 1971 Turkish military memorandum, he was dismissed from the university. In 1974, he returned and in 1980 he became a full professor in Constitutional Law. After 1993 he continued in Galatasaray University. In 2000, he was elected as the rector of Galatasaray University. Between 2003 and 2007 he was appointed as the chairman of Council of Higher Education.

Teziç died of heart failure on 23 April 2017. He was buried at Aşiyan Asri Cemetery following a memorial ceremony at Galatasaray University and the religious funeral at Ortaköy Mosque.

== Awards ==
In 2004 he was awarded order of merit by Turkish president Ahmet Necdet Sezer. In the same year he received a Legion of Honour award (Commandeur rank) from France, but returned it. He was also awarded Docteur Honoris Causa from Sorbonne University. In 2005 Varna University in Bulgaria named him emeritus professor.

== Books ==
His published books are the following:

1. 1967: Seçim Sistemleri ("Electoral systems")
2. 1972: Türkiye'de 1961 Anayasasına göre Kanun Kavramı ("Law concept in Turkey according to 1961 Turkish constitution")
3. 1975: Kıbrıs Sorunu ("Cyprus Issue")
4. 1976: Siyasi Partiler ("Political Parties")
5. 1980: Türk Parlamento Hukukunun Kaynakları ve İlgili Anayasa Mahkemesi Kararları ("Turkish Parliamentary Law and the related decisions of the Constitutional court")
6. 1998: Anayasa Hukuku ("Constitutional law")
