= Turhan Erdoğan =

Turkish academic (1938–2019)

Turhan Yaşar Erdoğan
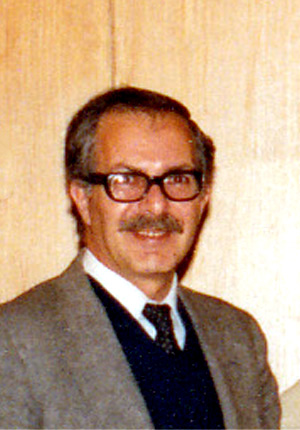
- Born: 1 January 1938; Tarsus, Mersin, Turkey
- Died: 4 January 2019 (aged 81)
- Resting place: Karşıyaka Cemetery
- Education: Middle East Technical University
- Scientific career
- Fields: Civil engineering
- Workplaces: Ankara

Turhan Yaşar Erdoğan (1 January 1938, Tarsus – 4 January 2019, in Ankara) was a Turkish academic in civil engineering.

He graduated from Tarsus American College in 1957. He completed his M.S. studies in the Civil Engineering Department of the Middle East Technical University (METU) in 1963, and Ph.D. at the University of Berkeley and METU in 1970.

Turhan Erdoğan continued his academic career at Middle East Technical University after completing his studies. He advanced through the academic ranks, becoming an assistant professor in 1971, an associate professor in 1975, and a full professor in 1981, specializing in construction materials. Although he retired in 2005, he remained active at METU as a part-time professor until his passing. Turhan Erdoğan was interred at Karşıyaka Cemetery He was the father of two sons, Selim and Sinan.

== Books ==
Turhan Erdoğan authored several books in both Turkish and English. His works include:

- Beton (English: “Concrete”)
- Basic Materials of Construction
- Materials Science
- Materials of Construction
- Bağlayıcı Malzemelerin ve Batonun Onbin Yıllık Tarihi (English: “Ten Thousand Years-History of Concrete and Binding Materials”)
