= Istanbul Bilgi University =

Private university in Turkey

- İstanbul Bilgi Üniversitesi
- Motto: Non scholae sed vitae discimus (Latin)
- Motto in English: Learning not for school, but for life
- Type: Private
- Established: 7 June 1996; 30 years ago
- Rector: Ege Yazgan
- Students: 22,000
- Location: Istanbul, Turkey; 41°04′00″N 28°56′45″E
- Campus: SantralIstanbul; Dolapdere; Kuştepe
- Language: English; Turkish
- Website: bilgi.edu.tr

University rankings

Global – Overall
- CWUR World: 1325 (2025)
- QS World: 1401+ (2026)
- THE World: 1501+ (2026)
- USNWR Global: 974 (2026)

Global – Liberal arts
- THE Social Sciences: 1001+ (2026)

Regional – Overall
- USNWR Asia: 315 (2026)

Regional – Business
- QS Europe MBA: 91 (2026)

Istanbul Bilgi University (Turkish: İstanbul Bilgi Üniversitesi) is a private university founded in 1996, located in Eyüpsultan, Istanbul, Turkey. The university has four campuses in Istanbul: SantralIstanbul, Kuştepe, Dolapdere, and Kozyatağı.

== History ==
The university was established with the motto Non scholae, sed vitae discimus, and is regarded as Turkey's fourth private university. Its precursor institution was the Istanbul School of International Studies.

In 2007, the university expanded with the opening of its SantralIstanbul Campus, located on the site of the Silahtarağa Power Plant, the first urban-scale power plant of the Ottoman Empire. The Kozyatağı Campus was later established on the Asian side of Istanbul in 2015.

In 2019, Can Holding became a supporter of the Bilgi Education and Culture Foundation, which oversaw the university. The university furthered its internationalization efforts in 2020 through a collaboration with Arizona State University aimed at improving the quality of education and research. According to the 2020 Turkey University Satisfaction Survey, Istanbul Bilgi University ranked among the A group universities in the country. In 2025, Istanbul Bilgi University ranked among the top 5 private universities in Turkey according to the QS World University Rankings.

Academic representatives from each department, elected by the students in the fall semester, are part of the university council. The university also offers a vibrant student life, with various student clubs. In 2007, Istanbul Bilgi University established an official student LGBT organization, named Gökkuşağı (English: Rainbow). Since its foundation, Istanbul Bilgi University has been administered by the Board of Trustees, consisting of 11 members. The president of the board is Dr. Çağrı Bağcıoğlu.

Istanbul Bilgi University was closed by decree published in the Official Gazette on 22 May 2026 in accordance with Additional Article 11 of the Higher Education Law No. 2547. Following the closure, students were transferred to Mimar Sinan Fine Arts University, the university's guarantor institution. The decree published in the Official Gazette on 25 May 2026 revoked the decision to withdraw the operating license of the university.

== Campuses ==
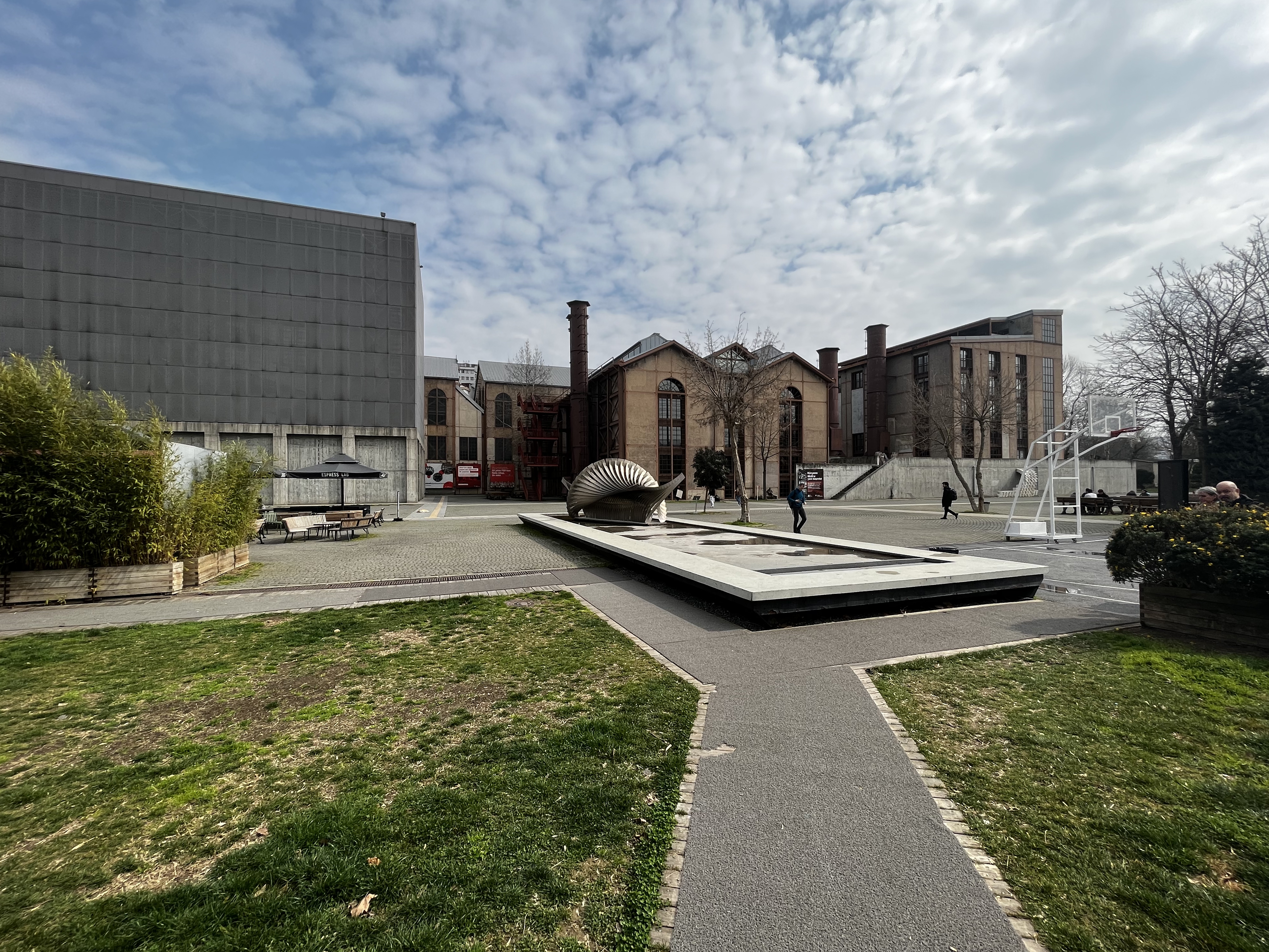
Santralistanbul

Santralistanbul Campus is the largest of Istanbul Bilgi University's four campuses. The campus is home to the Main Gallery building, which serves as a venue for contemporary art exhibitions and cultural events. In 2010, the Main Gallery received the prestigious International Architecture Awards. Additionally, the campus includes an annex building offering over 5,000 square meters of space for approximately 3,000 students, located just a four-minute walk from the main campus.

Dolapdere Campus is situated near Taksim in Istanbul. This campus has received multiple accolades, including the "Structure and Life Architecture Award" in 2002 and the "European Award for Steel Structure" in 2005. Dolapdere Campus houses the Faculty of Health Sciences and the School of Applied Sciences, as well as a fitness center and a short-course swimming pool.

Kuştepe Campus is located in the Şişli district of Istanbul and is Istanbul Bilgi University's first campus.

== Libraries and museums ==
Istanbul Bilgi University has three libraries, located at the Dolapdere Campus, the Kuştepe Campus, and the Santralistanbul Campus. The university library system provides extensive resources to support degree programs, research, and teaching.

The Santralistanbul Campus is also home to the Energy Museum. Istanbul Bilgi University Press was founded in 2000 and publishes academic and scholarly works.

== Controversies ==
According to the Turkish media outlet Cumhuriyet, Bilgi has been accused of having connections with the US Central Intelligence Agency. It was part of an investigation into an alleged 2016 taking by a Bilgi University board member of $18 million in funds meant for a Turkish reforestation program was closed in 2018 by the US Department of Justice, having considered charges of corruption violations. In 2018, the US Department of Justice closed its inquiry into possible corruption violations.

== Notable people ==
=== Faculty ===
- Asaf Savaş Akat, Turkish economist
- Ulus Baker, Turkish sociologist
- Murat Belge, Turkish literary critic
- İsmail Cem, former Minister of Foreign Affairs of Turkey
- Ricky Ford, American jazz tenor saxophonist
- Pınar Kür, Turkish author and dramatist
- Şule Kut, Turkish international relations scholar
- Butch Morris, American cornetist and composer
- Niyazi Öktem, Turkish law academic
- İlter Turan, former president of the International Political Science Association
- İlhan Usmanbaş, Turkish contemporary classical composer
- Serap Yazıcı, Turkish politician and academic of constitutional law
- Derviş Zaim, Turkish-Cypriot filmmaker
- Rona Serozan, Turkish jurist and civil law scholar
- Betül Mardin, Turkish publicist

=== Alumni ===
- Refik Anadol, Turkish-American new media artist
- Meriç Aral, Turkish actress
- Enis Arıkan, Turkish actor
- Simay Barlas, Turkish actress
- Can Bonomo, Jewish-Turkish singer who represented Turkey in the Eurovision Song Contest 2012
- Murat Boz, Turkish singer and songwriter
- Kenan Doğulu, Turkish singer and songwriter who represented Turkey in the Eurovision Song Contest 2007
- Ebru Günay, Kurdish politician
- Hazal Kaya, Turkish actress
- Uraz Kaygılaroğlu, Turkish actor
- Halit Özgür Sarı, Turkish actor
- Sıla, Turkish singer and songwriter
- Nimet Tanrıkulu, Turkish human rights activist
- İrem Derici, Turkish singer and songwriter
- Pelin Çelik, Turkish volleyball player
- Eda Ece, Turkish actress
- Tuba Ünsal, Turkish actress and model
- Yalın, Turkish singer and songwriter
- Furkan Andıç, Turkish actor
- Hande Soral, Turkish actress
- Sümeyra Koç, Turkish actress
- Gül Gölge, Turkish TV presenter
- Hakan Demirel, Turkish basketball player
- Sarp Levendoğlu, Turkish actor
- Aytekin Mindan, Turkish swimmer

== See also ==
- SantralIstanbul
- Silahtarağa Power Station
- Espressolab
- List of universities in Istanbul
- List of universities in Turkey
