= Gül Gölge =

Turkish TV presenter (born 1981)

Gül Gölge (born September 28, 1981 in İzmir, Turkey) is a Turkish TV presenter. She is the well-known for being the former host of the program Canlı Canlı which aired on Kanal D. She is also a model and actress, having acted in Çiçek Taksi, Yapayalnız and Köpek among others dramas and soaps. She was runner-up at the Miss Turkey pageant in 1997.

Gül finished her secondary education at Özel Türk Koleji in İzmir and went for higher education to Istanbul. She graduated from Istanbul Bilgi University with a bachelor's degree in Film and Television.
