= Atatürk University =

Public university located in Erzurum, Turkey

- Atatürk Üniversitesi
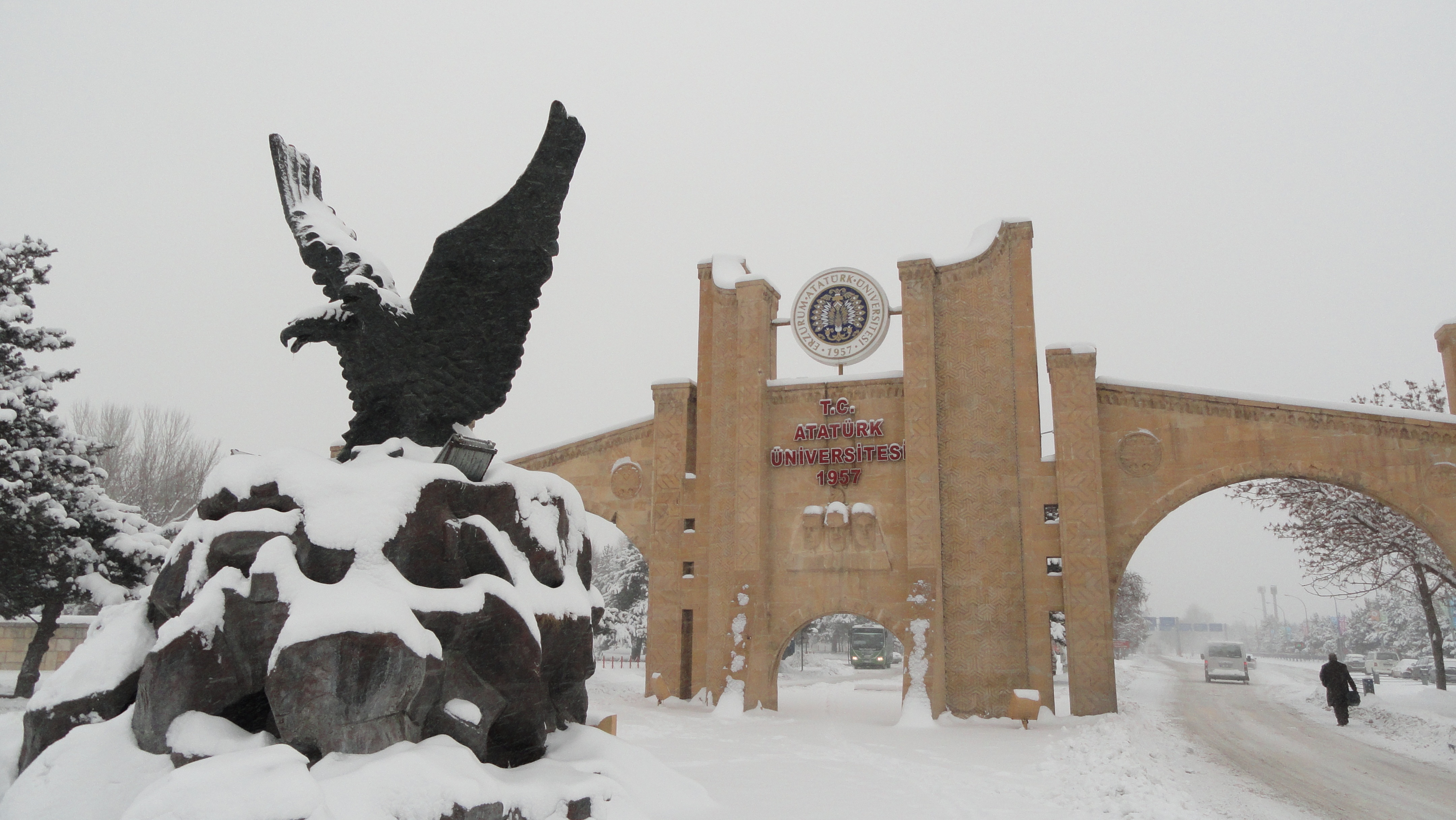
- The entrance gate of Atatürk University
- Type: Public research university
- Established: 1957; 69 years ago
- Affiliations: CUA; CoHE; Bologna Process; Erasmus Programme
- Rector: Prof. Dr. Ömer Çomaklı
- Students: 90,000 (2014)
- Location: Erzurum, Turkey; 39.90290°N 41.25284°E
- Campus: Suburban
- Language: Turkish, English
- Colours: Navy Cream
- Website: atauni.edu.tr

University rankings

Regional – Overall
- QS Emerging Europe and Central Asia: 190 (2022)

Atatürk University (Turkish: Atatürk Üniversitesi) is a public land-grant research university established in 1957 in Erzurum, Turkey, in collaboration with the University of Nebraska. The university comprises 23 faculties, 18 colleges, 8 institutes, and 30 research centers. The university's main campus is located in Erzurum, one of the largest cities in Eastern Anatolia, and is considered one of the city's most prominent assets. Since its founding, the university has been a center of educational and cultural development for the eastern region of Turkey.

== History ==
The establishment of Atatürk University represents the fulfillment of one of the significant initiatives envisioned during the early years of the Turkish Republic. On November 1, 1937, in his opening address for the legislative year at the Grand National Assembly of Turkey, Mustafa Kemal Atatürk emphasized the need for a major university in Eastern Anatolia. He called for the necessary steps to be taken to realize this vision.

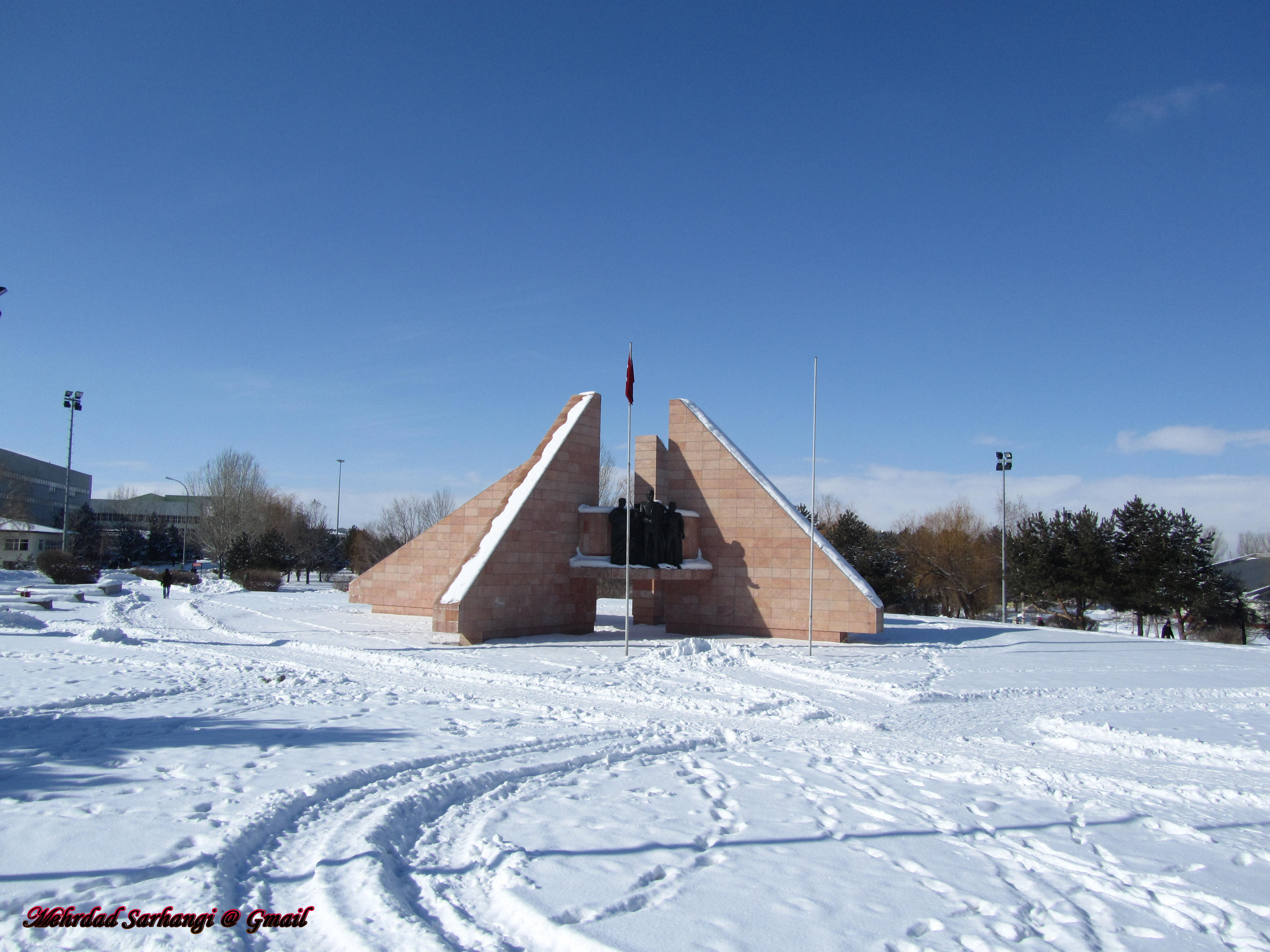
Atatürk University during winter

Following Atatürk's death, the initiative lay dormant for twelve years until the third President of Turkey, Celal Bayar, revived the proposal in his parliamentary speech on November 1, 1950. Responding to this, the second Adnan Menderes government included the establishment of a university in its agenda. The Ministry of Education issued a directive (No. XIV/5366, dated June 11, 1951) to university administrations, instructing them to form a scientific commission to plan a higher education and cultural center in the eastern region. Subsequently, the inter-university board convened and established a 15-member scientific commission, with five representatives selected by the senates of each of the three universities existing in Turkey at the time.

The commission, chaired by Minister of Education Tevfik İleri, held its first meeting in Ankara on July 7, 1951. It was decided that an investigative tour of the eastern provinces would be conducted, which included the participation of President Bayar. The commission ultimately selected Erzurum as the location for the proposed university, a decision formalized in a detailed report.

On February 25, 1953, the draft law for the establishment of a university in Eastern Anatolia was approved, becoming Law No. 6059. In March 1954, under Minister of Education Prof. Dr. Salim Burçak, the institution was officially named "Atatürk University" under Law No. 6373. Subsequently, the government sought assistance from the United States, engaging with the American Organization for Economic Development. As a result, an agreement was reached to receive support, modeled on the land-grant universities in the United States. A delegation from the University of Nebraska, including experts such as Albin T. Anderson, J.O. Keller, M.L. Baker, and S.A. Smith, visited Turkey in July 1954 and submitted recommendations for the university’s establishment in a report dated August 10, 1955.

The draft law for the university was adopted by the Grand National Assembly as Law No. 6990 on May 31, 1957. It came into force on June 7, 1957, following its publication in the Official Gazette, officially marking the foundation of Atatürk University. As of the 2016–2017 academic year, Atatürk University had approximately 280,000 students, 2,610 faculty members, 22 faculties, 18 colleges, 8 institutes, and 30 research centers. Since its establishment, the university has produced over 170,000 graduates.

== Campus ==
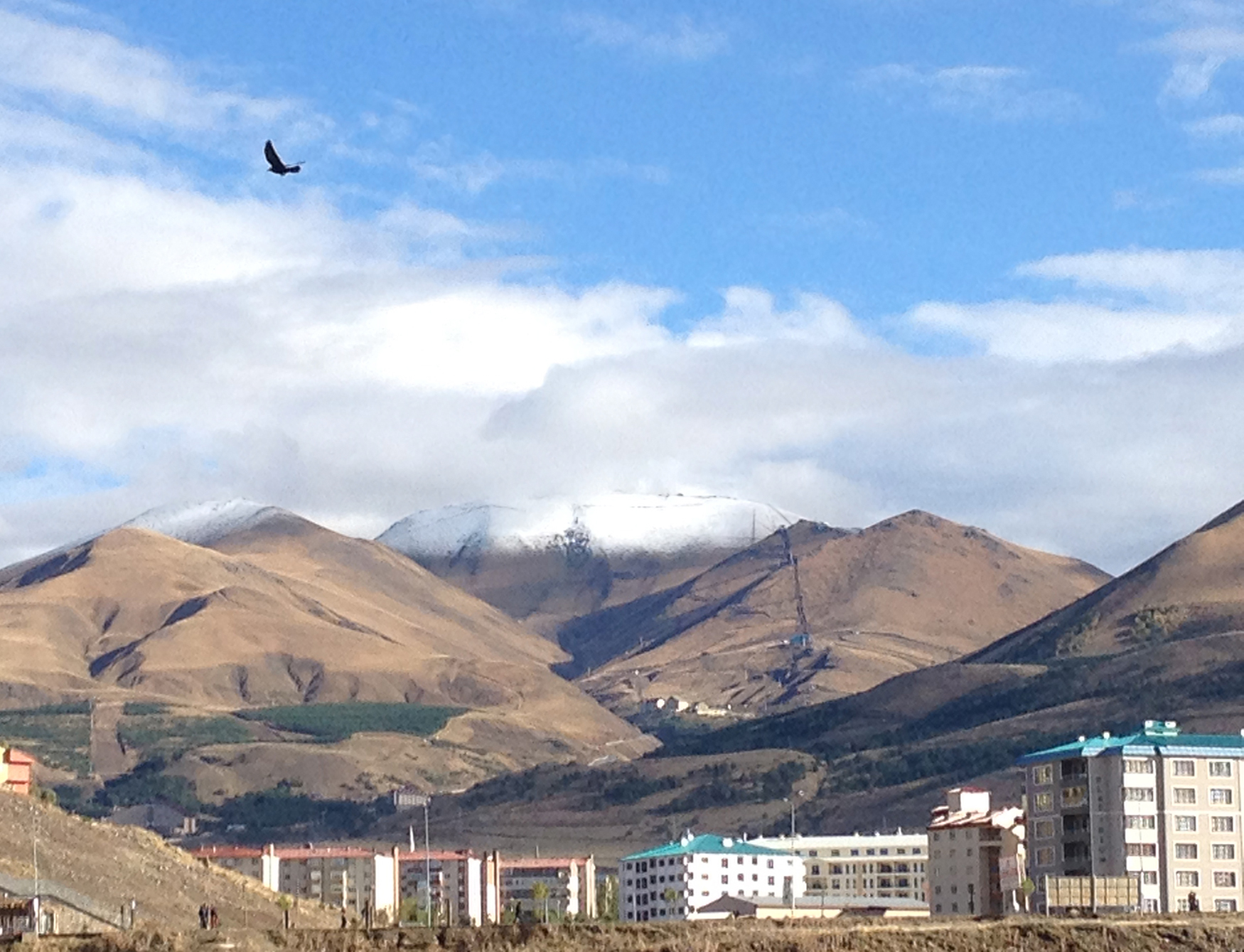
A southeastern view of Palandöken Mountain from the Atatürk University Campus

Atatürk University offers a variety of facilities and services to support academic and student life. The university operates one of the largest training and research hospitals in Turkey, serving as a key healthcare provider for the Eastern Anatolia and Eastern Black Sea regions. Healthcare services at the university hospital are available 24 hours a day, with free access for students under the age of 25.

The campus includes diverse social and recreational facilities, such as movie theaters, fitness centers, Olympic swimming pools, and a bowling center. The university also provides cultural courses in areas such as traditional folk dances, Turkish folk music, Western music, and theater. Additionally, the campus hosts cultural festivals, concerts, ceremonies, exhibitions, and other events throughout the academic year.

Dining facilities on campus include four main refectories, 40 canteens, five restaurants, and seven cafes, offering a range of affordable meal options. The university library, noted for its extensive collections, is a member of the Online National Academic Information Network. It houses a wide range of books, historical records, and other resources, and provides both private and communal study spaces for students.

Atatürk University participates in international academic exchange programs, including the Erasmus program. The university hosts 2,323 international students, comprising 1,366 undergraduate, 423 graduate, and 451 doctoral students enrolled in various academic programs. The university also houses the Eastern Anatolia Observatory.

== Affiliations ==
The university maintains a twinning and cooperation agreement with the University of Nebraska and is a member of the Balkan Universities Network. Additionally, it is a member of the Caucasus University Association.

== Organisation ==
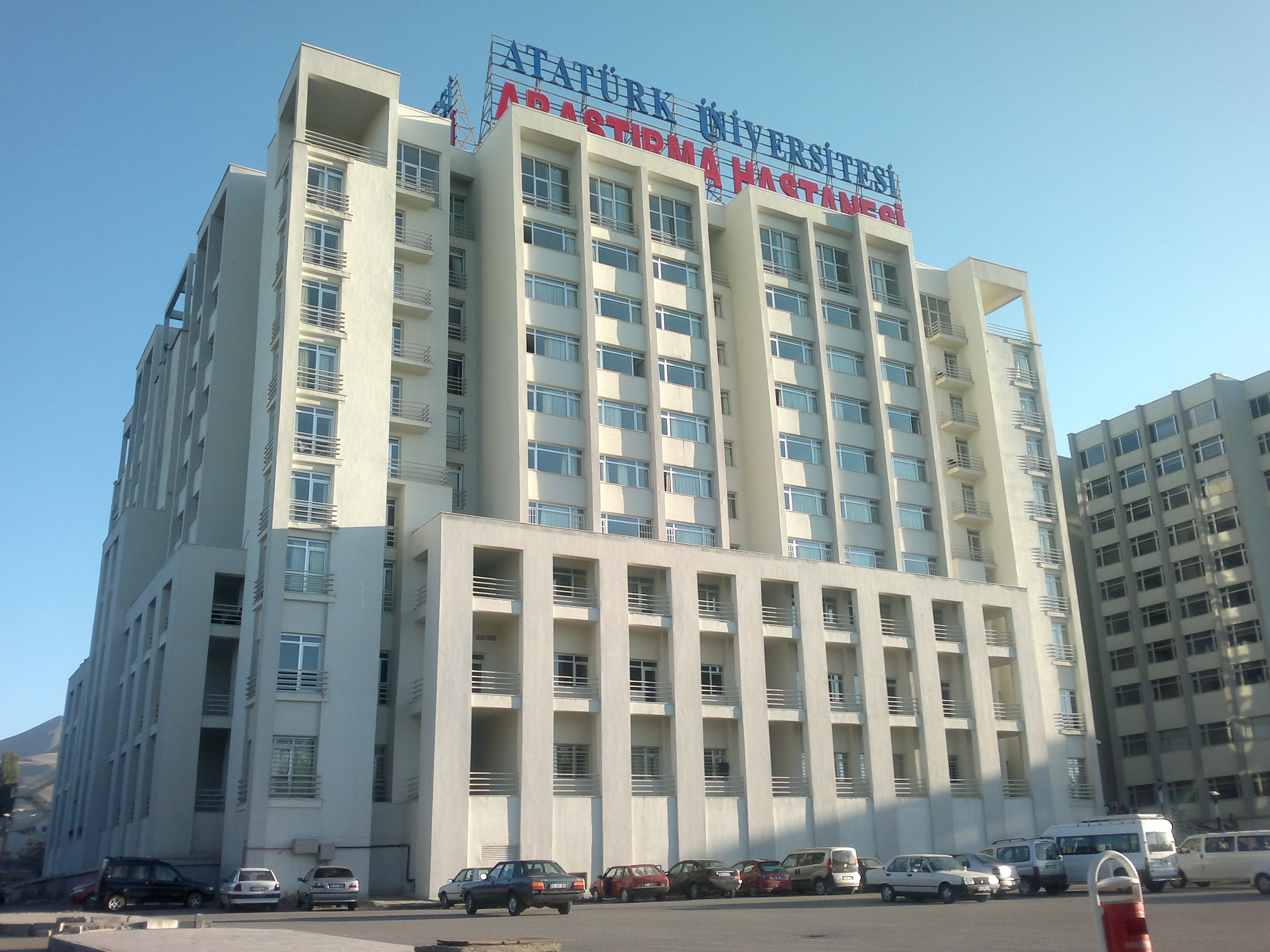
Atatürk University Hospital

Faculties

- Distance Education Faculty
- Faculty of Architecture and Design
- Faculty of Agriculture
- Faculty of Sciences
- Faculty of Literature
- Faculty of Economics and Business Administration
- Faculty of Medicine
- Faculty of Dentistry
- Kazım Karabekir Faculty of Education
- Faculty of Earth Sciences
- Faculty of Engineering
- Faculty of Theology
- Faculty of Fine Arts
- Faculty of Fisheries
- Faculty of Communications
- Faculty of Pharmacy
- Faculty of Veterinary
- Faculty of Laws
- Oltu Faculty of Geosciences
- Faculty of Health Sciences
- Sports Science Faculty
- Faculty of Tourism

Colleges

- College of Nursing
- College of Physical Education and Sports
- Erzurum College of Health
- College of Foreign Languages
- College of Tourism and Hotel Management
- Turkish Music State Conservatory

Vocational colleges

- Vocational School of Justice
- Erzurum Vocational College
- Erzurum Vocational College of Health Services
- High school of Physical Education and Sports
- Aşkale Vocational College
- Hınıs Vocational College
- İspir Hamza Polat Vocational College
- Narman Vocational College
- Oltu Vocational College
- Horasan Vocational College
- Şenkaya Vocational College
- Pasinler Vocational College

Institutes

- Institute of Atatürk's Doctrines and History of Reforms
- Institute of Sciences
- Institute of Educational Sciences
- Institute of Fine Arts
- Institute of Health Sciences
- Institute of Social Sciences
- Institute of Turcology
- Winter Sports Institute

Research Centers

- Acupuncture and Complementary Medical Methods Application and Research Center
- Eurasia Silk Road Universities Application and Research Center
- Astrophysics Research and Application Center
- Health Research and Applications Center
- Earthquake Research Center
- Environmental Problem Research Center
- Biotechnology Research Center
- Eastern Anatolia High Technology Application and Research Center
- Nano Science and Nano Engineering Research and Application Center
- Computer Science Application and Research Center
- Language Education Application and Research Center
- Disabled, Elderly and Veteran Research and Excellence Research and Application Center
- Ibrahim Hakkı Research Center
- Human Values Education Application and Research Center
- Women's Issues Research and Application Center
- European Communities Application and Research Center
- Middle East and Central Asia - Caucasus Research and Application Center
- Organ Transplant Education Research and Application Center
- Turkish Armenian Relations Research Center
- Social Research Application and Research Center
- University Industry Cooperation Development Center
- Medical Aromatic Plant-Drug Research Center
- Agricultural Research and Publication Center
- Medical Experimental Application and Research Center
- Carpet Training Center
- Occupational Health and Safety Practice and Research Center
- Strategic Research Center
- Continuing Education Application and Research Center
- Distance Learning Application and Research Center
- Gifted Education Research and Application Center

== Notable alumni ==
- Furkan Akar — Turkish Olympian short track speed skater
- Recep Akdağ — Turkish physician and politician, former Minister of Health
- Atakan Alaftargil — Olympian alpine skier
- Erdoğan Büyükkasap — Turkish scientist and president of Erzincan Binali Yıldırım University
- Bilal Ömer Çakır — Turkish curler
- Adem Çalkın — Turkish businessman and politician
- Cezmi Polat — Turkish politician and general contractor
- Ahmet Demircan — Turkish physician and politician, former Minister of Health
- Ömer Dinçer — Turkish politician and academic, former Minister of National Education
- Ahmet Eşref Fakıbaba — Turkish doctor, politician and former Minister of Agriculture and Forestry
- Ayşe Gözütok — Turkish curler
- Elif Kızılkaya — Turkish curler
- Abdülkadir Köroğlu — Turkish amateur boxer
- Mehmet Kamaç — Turkish politician
- Ferhat Pehlivan — Turkish amateur boxer
- Öznur Polat — Turkish curler
- Emre Şimşek — Olympian Turkish skier
- Seyit Torun — Turkish economist and politician
- Muhammet Oǧuz Zengin — Turkish curler
