= Seha Meray =

Turkish academic

- Born: 1921; Istanbul, Turkey
- Died: 1978 (aged 56–57); Ankara, Turkey
- Citizenship: Turkish
- Education: Mekteb-i Mülkiye
- Scientific career
- Fields: International law
- Workplaces: Mekteb-i Mülkiye; METU; McGill University

Seha Meray (1921–1978) was a Turkish academic.

He was born in Istanbul and completed his secondary education at Galatasaray High School in 1940. He pursued higher education at the Faculty of Political Sciences at Ankara University, graduating in 1944. After graduation, he joined the same faculty as an academic. He became an associate professor in 1948 and was promoted to professor of International Law in 1954.

Between February 23, 1961, and August 5, 1961, he served as the rector of Middle East Technical University (METU). Later, he traveled to Canada as a visiting professor and lectured on Space Law at McGill University. He was also a member of the National Committee of UNESCO and actively contributed to the Turkish Language Association.

He died in 1978 in Ankara.

== Books ==
In addition to textbooks, his notable publications include:

- Toplum Bilim Üzerine (English: On Society and Science)
- İnsanca Yaşamak (English: Living Humanly)
- Su Başlarını Devler Tutmuş (English: Critical Posts Were Occupied by the Giants)
- Lozan Barış Konferansı Belgeleri (English: Documents of the Conference of Lausanne, 6 volumes)
