= Zeynep Çelik-Butler =

Zeynep Çelik-Butler (also known as Zeynep Çelik) is a Turkish-American professor of electrical engineering at the Nanotechnology Research and Teaching Facility within the College of Engineering at the University of Texas at Arlington. She is an IEEE Fellow and a life member of Eta Kappa Nu.

== Biography ==
Çelik-Butler received a BS in physics from Boğaziçi University, Istanbul, Turkey, in 1982. Coming to the United States, she received a 1984 MS in electrical engineering from the University of Rochester in New York in 1984, and then a PhD in electrical engineering in 1987, also from Rochester.

== Research ==
The research activities in microelectromechanical systems (MEMS) started in the early 1990s with the development of new materials for microbolometers for room-temperature infrared detection. This work set the foundation for IR detectors on flexible substrates. The group demonstrated the first IR microbolometer array on a polyimide substrate with performance comparable to those on silicon substrates. Based on the success of this IR radiation detector work on flexible substrates, the group expanded to other sensing functionalities like flow, tactile, pressure, force and most recently acceleration. Integration of sensors on conformal substrates necessitated the group to initiate die-level encapsulation for flexible device packaging. Today, the group is focusing on multifunctional, conformal sensor arrays with integrated bias, read-out and power capabilities, the so-called Smart Skin, for aerospace, defense and medical applications.

The second thrust area is noise and reliability of nanoelectronic devices. In the early 1980s, as a graduate student under the supervision of Professor Thomas Hsiang, Celik-Butler developed one of the first 1/f noise theories based on the McWhorter Noise Model and applied to metal–oxide–semiconductor field-effect transistor (MOSFETs). Most recently, the same model has been revised to account for low-frequency noise observed on multi-stack gate MOSFETs, specifically high-k dielectric gate oxides. The research group has also investigated and developed noise models for polysilicon emitter bipolar transistors, lateral pnp bipolar transistors and SiGe heterojunction bipolar transistors. One of the contributions of the research group is the demonstration of random telegraph signal (RTS) noise as a non-destructive characterization and reliability tool in nanoelectronics. Today, this research thrust area is investigating the effect of extended drain region on noise and reliability of LDMOS structures.

Butler is a Fellow of the Institute of Electrical and Electronics Engineers.
