= Osman Nuri Eralp =

Turkish microbiologist

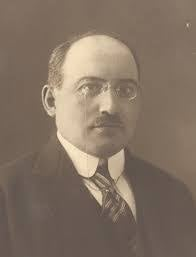
- Born: 1876; Arapgir, Malatya, Ottoman Empire
- Died: 1940 (aged 63–64); Istanbul, Turkey
- Education: Darülfünun; Sorbonne; Pasteur Institute
- Scientific career
- Fields: Veterinary medicine, bacteriology, virology
- Workplaces: Istanbul University; Ankara University

Osman Nuri Eralp (1876–1940) was a Turkish politician, veterinarian and microbiologist.

Eralp was born in Arapgir, Malatya in the Ottoman Empire. He completed his university education at "Mekteb-i Tıbbiye-i Mülkiye" which was the medical school of Darülfünun (House of Multiple Sciences, name of Istanbul University in Ottoman era). To continue studying for a post-graduate qualification, he attended Sorbonne and Pasteur Institute. After graduation, he worked as a veterinarian and also continued his researches. After 1908, he worked as a full-time academic at Istanbul University and Ankara University. He lectured on histology and embryology.

He notably contributed to the field of bacteriology via his research on microorganisms (tuberculosis, anthrax, cholera, syphilis, gonorrhea), and the field of virology by his research on rinderpest.

He wrote the first science fiction book in Turkey called Başka Dünyalarda Canlı Mahlukat Var Mıdır? (Are there alive creatures in other worlds?).
