= Beğlan Birand Toğrol =

Turkish psychologist

Beğlan Birand Toğrol (March 1927 in Istanbul – 19 January 2016) was a Turkish scientist, best known for her contributions to medical and experimental psychology.

== Early life ==
Toğrol attended Istanbul University where she got certificates both in English Literature and in Psychology (1945–1949). In 1948 she had also enrolled to the Academy of Fine Arts taking a degree in painting from the famous Turkish painter Nurullah Berk's studio in 1952. Then, as Fulbright Exchange Scholar in psychology she went to Stanford University in California, U.S.A. (1952–1953). On her return to Istanbul University she earned her PhD at the Psychology Department, Istanbul University, under Wilhelm Peters and Mümtaz Turhan in 1954.

== Academic life ==
She was elected to Sarah Smithson Research Fellowship at Newnham College, Cambridge, where she conducted experiments on "colour perception" at the Psychology Department of the University (1957–1960). University of Cambridge conferred her M.A. (Cantab) degree upon this election. She became a professor at the Psychology Department, Istanbul University in 1965. She held the Chair of Experimental Psychology (1969–1977), and was the Head of the Department of Psychology (1982–1994). She was also the Principal of the Institute of Experimental Psychology (1969–1981). She has published 10 books, and over a hundred original articles mostly in visual perception, medical psychology and on psychological problems of different social and cultural groups.

== Awards and recognition ==
In 1992 she was elected to "Honorary Fellowship" of Newnham College, Cambridge. She received an award from the Children’s Foundation of Turkey for her socio-cultural researches on "the Turkish family".
