= Tübingen University Faculty of Law =

Coordinates: 48.5246824°N 9.0581718°E

Tübingen Law Faculty
- Juristische Fakultät der Eberhardina Carolina
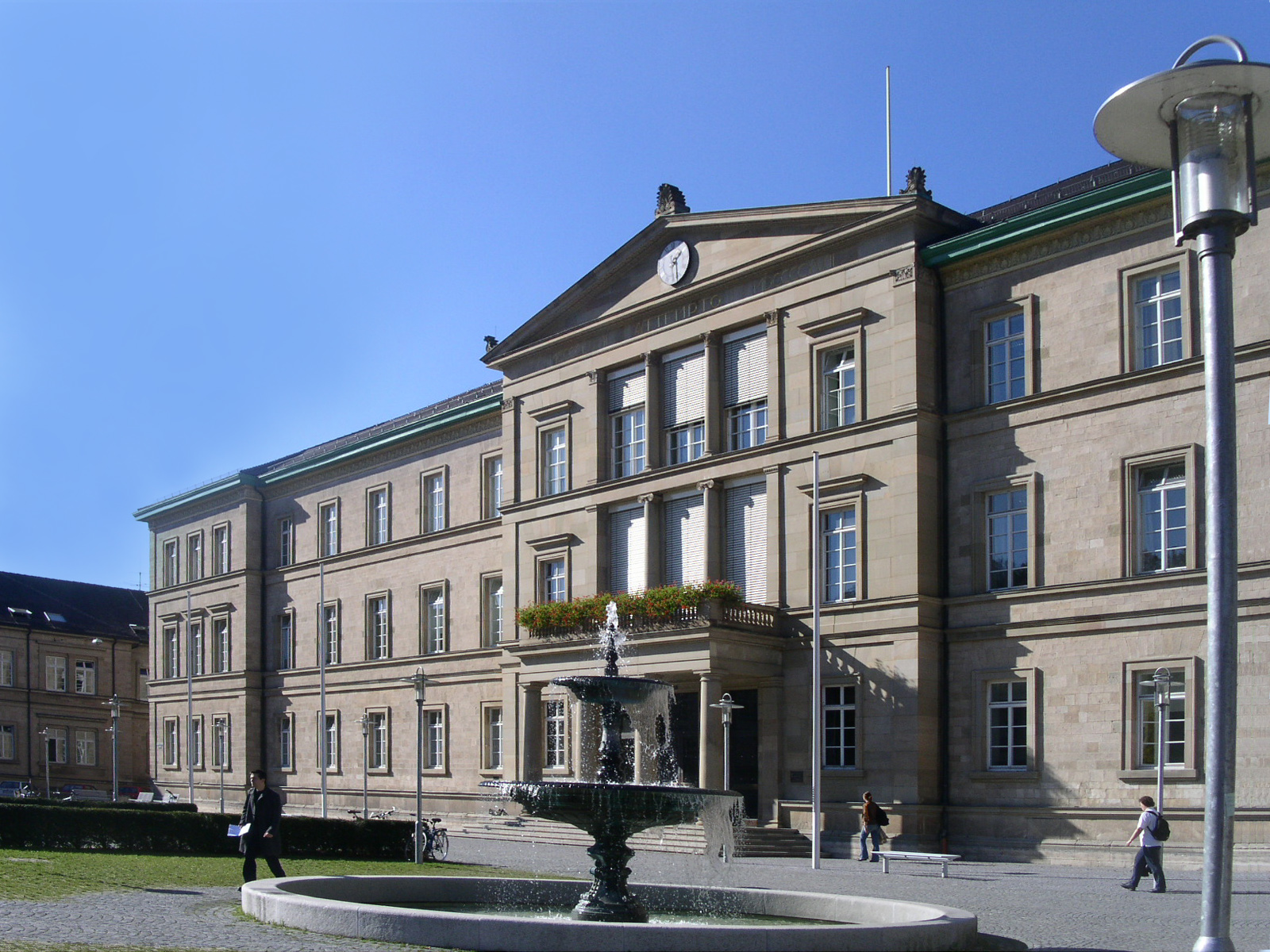
- Aula The Law Faculty is located in the Neue Aula
- Established: October 1, 1477; 549 years ago
- Parent institution: University of Tübingen
- Dean: Christine Osterloh-Konrad
- Students: 2,374 (WS2016/17)
- Location: Tübingen, Germany
- Website: uni-tuebingen.de/en/fakultaeten/juristische-fakultaet/fakultaet

The Tübingen University Faculty of Law (German: Juristische Fakultät der Eberhardina Carolina), located in Tübingen, Germany, is one of the original four constituent faculties of Eberhard Karls Universität Tübingen. Founded in 1477 by Eberhard I, Duke of Württemberg, it is one of the oldest law schools in Germany.
