= Simten Cosar =

Turkish political scientist

- Education: Boğaziçi University(B.A); Bilkent University (M.Sc.)(Ph.D.)
- Occupation: scientist

Simten Cosar is a Turkish political scientist. She works as a professor of political thought in the Faculty of Communication at Hacettepe University, Ankara, Turkey.

== Early life ==
She attended Boğaziçi University and obtained a Bachelor in Political Science and International Relations in 1990. She then went on to obtain a Ph.D. and M.Sc. in Political Science and Public Administration from Bilkent University in 1997 and 1991 respectively.

== Career ==
She taught political science and international relations at Baskent University, Ankara, Turkey.

Cosar's main topics were political thought in Turkey and women's politics. She published in both English and Turkish that explore Turkish politics, feminist politics, and political thought. The published articles were featured in Monthly Review, Contemporary Politics, Feminist Review, South European Society and Politics and the Journal of Third World Studies.

She co-edited Silent Violence: Neoliberalism, Islamist Politics. The book is an anthology that explores contemporary Turkish politics by problematizing the synthetic articulation of Islamist politics with neo-liberal capitalism during the AK party's decade-long rule. The contributions analyze the policies of the AKP regime in order to understand the changes in Turkish Society.

Cosar was interviewed by Gülden Ozcan after the aftermath of Gezi and Erdoğan's Presidential election. The interview explored the current social and political values in Turkey and the violent rule of the AKP regime. The book concerned the increasing electoral success of the AKP party within the most recent elections. The book analyzed the party's rise to power and how the party's policies are viewed both in Turkey and around the world.

Cosar has performed research in the Department of Women, Gender and Sexuality Studies at the University of Massachusetts, Amherst. Her research focused on neoliberal transformation in universities. Cosar is involved with feminist political activism throughout the world and has published papers such as "Women in Turkish Political Thought: Between Tradition and Modernity", which revealed the patriarchy in Turkish political thought.
