= Niyazi Öktem =

Turkish academic (born 1944)

Niyazi Öktem (born 1944) is a Turkish academic. Born in Elazığ, he is a professor of Public Law, Philosophy of Law, and Sociology of Law in the Faculty of Law at Istanbul Bilgi University. He is the president of the Intercultural Dialogue Platform, the most prominent inter-faith organisation in Turkey.

== Books ==
- Özgürlük Sorunu ve Hukuk (1977)
- Fenomonoloji ve Hukuk (1981)
- Hukuk Felsefesi ve Hukuk Sosyolojisi (1988)
- Sosyolojinin ve Felsefenin Verileriyle Devlet ve Hukuk Felsefesi Akımları (1993)
- Hallac-ı Mansur (1994)
- Din, Laiklik, Alevilik Yazıları (1995)
- Felsefe Sosyoloji, Hukuk ve Devlet (1999)
- Diyalog Yazıları (2001)
- Galatasaraylı Monsenyör (2001)
- Çağımız Hristiyan-Müslüman Diyalog Önderleri (2013)
