= Nevnihal Erdoğan =

Turkish architect (born 1959)

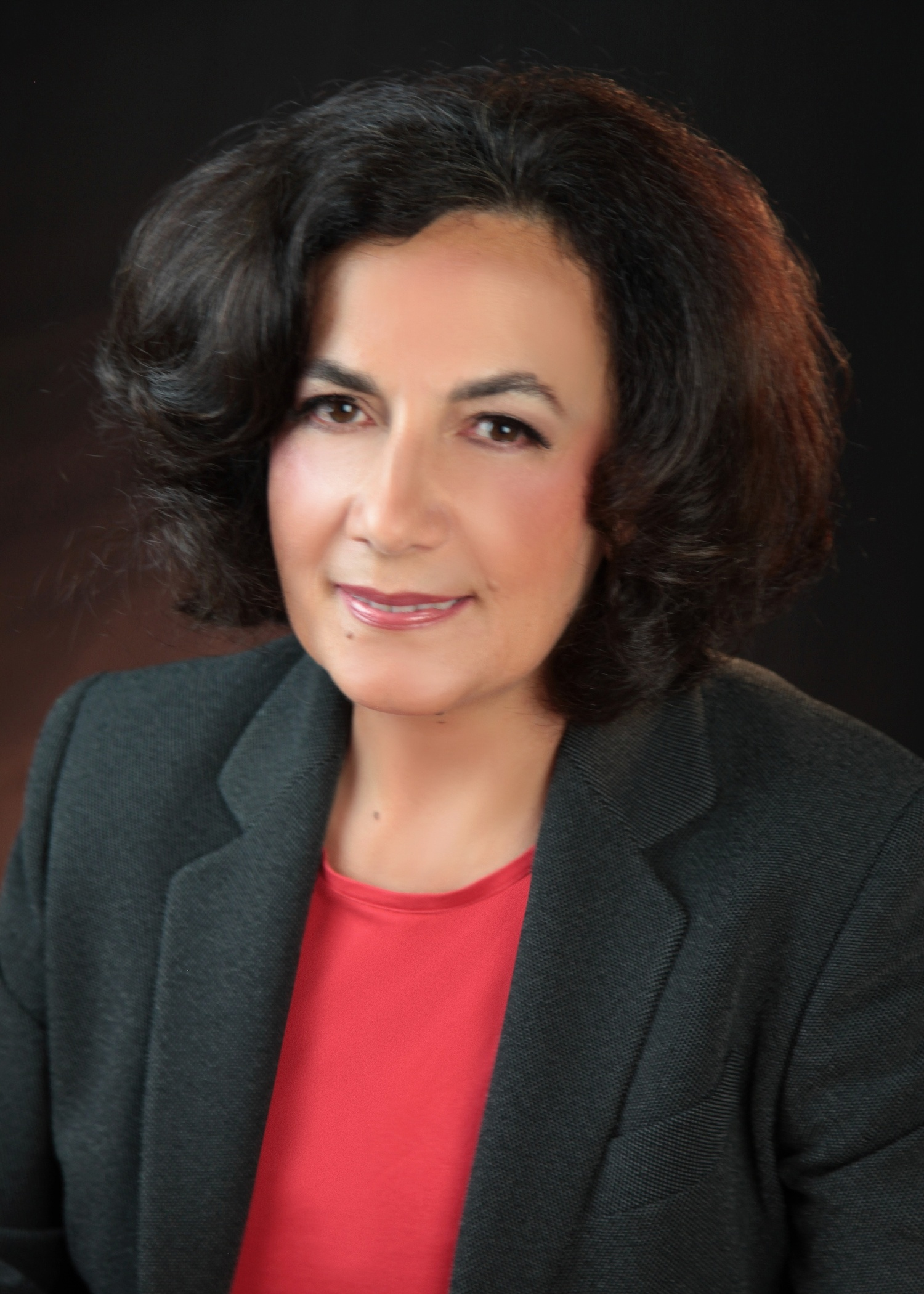
- Born: August 21, 1959 (age 67); Kars, Turkey
- Education: Kocaeli University
- Occupations: Professor, Architect

Nevnihal Erdoğan (born 21 August 1959) is a Turkish architect and professor of architecture at the University of Kocaeli in İzmit.

== Biography ==
=== Family and personal life ===
Erdoğan was born on August 21, 1959, in Kars, Turkey.

She grew up bilingual, Turkish and English in a Turkish family from a father named Jemal And a mother named Hanim.

=== Academic career ===
Erdoğan received a diploma in architecture from Istanbul Technical University in 1982, and M.S and Ph.D. from Istanbul Technical University in 1984 and 1992. She worked as lecture at Trakya University Department of Architecture during the years of 1992-2006 and is currently a professor in the Department of Architecture, University of Kocaeli. She has been as visiting scholarship at the University of California, Irvine, Department of Urban and Regional Planning School of Social Ecology and University of Wisconsin UW-Milwaukee School of Architecture. She gave undergraduate and graduate courses and supervised Master thesis and Doctoral thesis, and is currently teaching architecture design; theory of design at undergraduate and graduate level. Her research interests are in the interrelationship between culture and architecture, housing and settlement, architecture design.

== Works ==
The majority of Erdoğan's publications have focused on historical Istanbul, Edirne and Izmit cities and their architecture. Her publication appears in the Journal of Architecture and Planning Research, Social Indicators Research, Open House International.

She is an author of eleven books, four-section of book, editor of two proceedings and more than sixty papers issued in national and international proceeding books. She has completed various architectural projects and has participated in national-international competitions, research/projects. In 2011–12, during her Aga Khan post-doctoral fellowship, she will investigate the urban history and architectural context of Ottoman Edirne.

1st International Urban Planning-Architecture-Design Congress, Urban Transformation, Conference 2014 and 12th International Conference: Standardization, Prototypes, and Quality: A Means of Balkan Countries'Collaboration' 2015 were organized as Congress chair by her. Erdoğan was the duty of dean at University of Kocaeli Faculty of Architecture and Design between 2013 and 2016. Now she is conducting to head of Architecture at University of Kocaeli.

=== Books ===
- Traditional Window Designs of Kirklareli (Bentham Science Publishers Erdoğan, N., Yüksek, İ.,) (2013)
- Osmanlı Payitahtı Edirne (YEM Yayın 1.Baskı, İstanbul, Ekim) (Erdoğan, N.,) (The Ottoman Second Capital Edirne, YEM publishing, First Edition, Istanbul) (2019)
- Mimar Gözüyle Gelibolu (Verita Kitap, 1.Baskı, Eylül) (Erdoğan, N., Akarsu, H.T) (Gallipoli Through the Eyes of Architect, Verta kitap, First Edition, Istanbul) (2019)
- Gelenekten Cittaslow'a Taraklı (Verita Kitap, 1.Baskı, Eylül) (Erdoğan, N., Akarsu, H.T) (From Traditional to Cittaslow-Taraklı, Verta kitap, First Edition, Istanbul) (2018)
- Kültür Köprüleri 1 Selanik ve Kavala Bölgesindeki Osmanlı-Türk Mimari Mirası (Kocaeli Üniversitesi Vakfı Yayınları (KÜV), 1. Baskı, İstanbul, Ocak) (Erdoğan, N., Akarsu, H.T., Kaplan, S., Çırpı, M.E.,) (Cultural Bridges 1-Ottoman-Turkish Architectural Heritage in Region of Tessaloniki and Kavala, Kocaeli University Wakf Publishing, First Edition, Istanbul) (2016)
- Kültür Köprüleri 2 Üsküp ve Ohri Bölgesindeki Osmanlı-Türk Mimari (Mirası Kocaeli Üniversitesi Vakfı Yayınları (KÜV), 1. Baskı, İstanbul, Mart) (Erdoğan, N., Akarsu, H.T., Alik, B.,) (Cultural Bridges 2-Ottoman-Turkish Architectural Heritage in Region of Skopje and Ohrid, Kocaeli University Wakf Publishing, First Edition, Istanbul) (2016)
- Tarihsel Süreç İçinde Bankalar Caddesi(Voyvoda Caddesi) ve Günümüzdeki Yapıları (Kocaeli Üniversitesi Vakfı Yayınları (KÜV), 1. Baskı, İstanbul, Nisan) (Erdoğan, N., Şenyurt, O., Dökmeci, V.,) (Bankalar Street (Voyvoda Street) and Today Buildings in Historical Perspective, Kocaeli University Wakf Publishing, First Edition, Istanbul) (2016)
- Edebiyatta Mimarlık (YEM Yayın, 1.Baskı, İstanbul, Eylül) (Akarsu, H.T., Erdoğan, N.) (Architecture in Literature, YEM publishing, First Edition, Istanbul) (September 2016)
- Tarihi İzmit Kent Merkezi / Mahalleler. Sokaklar Mimari Eserler (Kocaeli Büyükşehir Belediyesi Kültür Yayınları 20, İstanbul) (Erdoğan, N., Ayyıldız, S., Özbayraktar, M.,) (Historical Izmit City Centre/ Neighborhood. Streets.architectural Works, Kocaeli Metropoliten Municipality Cultural Publications 20, Istanbul) (2011)
- Tarihi İzmit Kent Merkezi /Geleneksel Konutlar (Kocaeli Büyükşehir Belediyesi Kültür Yayınları 21, İstanbul) (Erdoğan, N., Ayyıldız, S., Özbayraktar, M.) [ Historical Izmit City Centre/ Traditional Houses, Kocaeli Metropoliten Municipality Cultural Publications 21, Istanbul) (2011)
- Edirne Kentinde Konut Yerleşimlerinin Fiziksel ve Sosyal yapısının Kültür Bağlamında Değerlendirilmesi (Trakya Üniversitesi Rektörlüğü Yayın no:67, Edirne) (Erdoğan, N.,) (Evaluation of the Physical and Social Structure of Residential Settlements in Edirne in the Context of Culture, Trakya University Rectorship Publication no.67, Edirne) (2006)
- Bina Bilgisi I (Mimari Tasarıma Hazırlık İlkeleri) Ders Notları (Trakya Üniversitesi Rektörlüğü yayınları No:21, Edirne) (Erdoğan, N.) (Building Knowledge I (Principles of Preparation for Architectural Designs) Lecture Notes, Trakya University Rectorship Publication no:21, Edirne) (1999)

=== Selected articles ===
1. A Model Suggestion for Determining Physical and Socio-Cultural Changes of Traditional Settlements in Turkey, A/Z ITU Journal of the Faculty of Architecture, vol.14 No.2, 2017, pp. 81–93.( Atik, D., Erdoğan, N.)
2. Cultural Traditions and Domestic Space: Ağaçbekler Home, SAGE Open, DOI:10.1177/215824401773815, 2017, pp. 1–16.(Erdoğan, N.)
3. Investigation the Relationship Between Culture and Traditional Housing Architecture in Urfa, Turkey, Journal of Architectural and Planning Research (JAPR), 33:4 (Winter, 2016), pp. 309–325.(Erdoğan, N.)
4. Vernacular Builtscape Metamorphosis in Turkey, Journal of Architecture and Planning Research (JAPR), 25:3 (Autumn 2008), pp 221– 239 (Erdoğan, N.)
5. Comparison of Urban Housing Satisfaction in Modern and Traditional Neighborhoods in Edirne, Social Indicators Research (2007) 81:127-148. (Erdoğan, N., Akyol, A., Ataman, B., Dökmeci, V.)
6. Socioenvironmental Determinants of Social Interactions in A Squatter Settlement in İstanbul, Journal of Architecture and Planning Research (JAPR), 13:4 (Winter,1996), (Erdoğan, N., Sağlamer, G., Dökmeci, V., Dikbaş, A.)
7. A Comparative Study on Squatter Settlements and Vernacular Architecture, Open House International, vol.18, No.1 pp:41-49, 1993 (Sağlamer, G., Erdoğan N.)
8. Günümüz Küresel Kentlerin Öncülleri: Osmanlı Döneminde Levant Liman Kentleri, YAPI, Sayı:438, 2018, sf.58-63. (Erdoğan, N,)
9. İstanbul: Mega Kentten Küreselleşen Kente-Kırmızı Saçlı Kadın, Gösteri Dergisi, Mart-Nisan-Mayıs/2018 sayı:325 sf.62-68 (Erdoğan, N,)
