= Vedat Demir =

Turkish academician, writer, and journalist (born 1966)

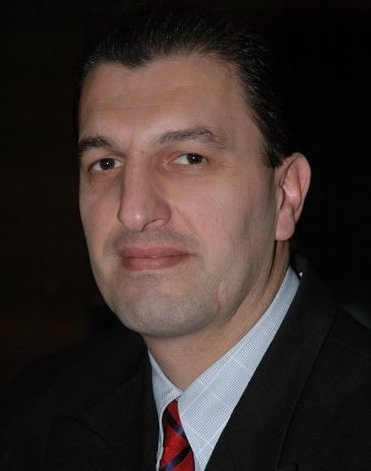
- Born: April 5,1966 (age 59–60); Sinop, Turkey
- Education: Marmara University, Istanbul University
- Occupations: Academician, writer, journalist

Vedat Demir (born April 5, 1966) is a visiting professor at the Free University of Berlin. He formerly served as the General Secretary of the Turkish Press Council and was a professor at his alma mater, Istanbul University, before he was targeted and imprisoned by the Turkish government.

== Early life and academic career ==
Prof. Vedat Demir was born on April 5, 1966, in Sinop, Turkey. He received his bachelor's and master's degrees from Marmara University and his PhD from Istanbul University, where he taught political communication, media ethics and policy making between 2010 and 2016. He was a visiting scholar Near Eastern Studies at Cornell University, in Ithaca, New York, between 2012 and 2014. Demir formerly served as General Secretary of the Turkish Press Council from 2000 to 2003.

=== 2016–17 Turkish purges ===
Demir has been an outspoken critic of the recent authoritarianism of the Turkish government, using his newspaper columns and television appearances to affirm democratic values, human rights, and rule of law. In 2015, a group of Turkish intellectuals, including Prof. Demir, started a petition campaign titled “Silence the Guns” calling for a reconciliation between the Turkish government and the Kurdish militants to end the ongoing civil war in Eastern Turkey. As a reaction to the government's seizure of critical newspapers and television stations in Turkey, Demir raised his voice in defense of press freedom and started writing at Yarına Bakış. In his columns he has also been a fierce defender of academic freedom.

In retaliation for his expression of academic opinions and journalistic activities, on July 20, 2016, Professor Demir along with 95 colleagues at Istanbul University, were suspended from their academic positions. On August 3, he was arrested and jailed. As the State Department noted in its 2016 human rights report, thousands of Turkish academics and journalists were arrested after the attempted coup with fabricated evidence and little clarity on the charges.

On September 1, 2016, Demir was formally dismissed from his duties at Istanbul University with a state of emergency decree that sacked thousands of academics in Turkish universities. Seven months after his arrest, Prof. Demir was released from prison under judicial supervision on February 14, 2017.

The European Court of Human Rights (ECHR) ruled on June 25, 2024, that Demir's detention constituted a violation of his rights, condemning Turkey. After a trial lasting approximately nine years, on February 6, 2025, the Istanbul 14th High Criminal Court acquitted Demir.

== Books ==
- 2025 (co-editor with C. Richter) The Public Diplomacy of Authoritarian Regimes. Palgrave Macmillan.
- 2012 Kamu Diplomasisi ve Yumuşak Güç [Public Diplomacy and Soft Power]. Beta.
- 2007 Türkiye’de Medya Siyaset İlişkisi [The Relationship Between Media and Politics in Turkey]. Beta.
- 2007 (co-editor with P. Yayınoğlu) İletişim Yansımaları-Uygulamalar, Gerçekler [The Echoes of Communication: Principles, Applications, Realities]. Anahtar.
- 2006 Medya Etiği [The Ethics of Media]. Beta.
- 2005 (co-editor with Z. Avşar). Düzenleme ve Uygulamalarla Medyada Denetim [The Supervision of Media with Regulation and Application]. Piramit.
- 1998 Türkiye’de Medya ve Özdenetimi [Media and Moderation in Turkey]. İletişim.
