= Ekonomist (magazine) =

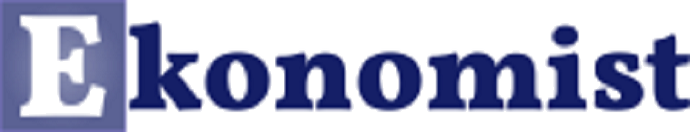
- Type: Online magazine
- Format: Magazine
- Owner: BePositive
- Founder: Ljiljana Premović
- Editor: Ljiljana Premović
- Founded: 2014
- Headquarters: Podgorica, Montenegro
- Website: ekonomist.me

Ekonomist is a Montenegrin online magazine, founded in 2014 in Podgorica. Ekonomist's primary focus is Montenegrin and world events, finances, business and economy. It aims at promoting good business practice and developing entrepreneurial awareness, as an important aspect of economic growth. Ekonomist is also the only FinTech portal in Montenegro, thus representing a platform for business and technology themes. In addition to national and world news, it features interviews, opinions, and career advice. Editor in chief is Ljiljana Premović.

== History ==
Ekonomist was founded in 2014 in Podgorica, Montenegro. The magazine was established with the goal of providing accurate and objective news and analysis related to Montenegro's economy, business, and finance sectors. The magazine is published in Montenegrin and offers articles on a range of topics, including market trends, financial analysis, and policy developments. In addition to its online platform, the magazine has also published several print editions. Over the years, Ekonomist has become a leading source of economic news and analysis in Montenegro, and currently rank the 3rd best finance magazine.
