= Erzincan Binali Yıldırım University =

Public university in Erzincan, Turkey

Coordinates: 39°45′31.4″N 39°30′22.9″E

- Erzincan Binali Yıldırım Üniversitesi
- Motto: "A world university in Anatolia"
- Type: Public University
- Established: 2006
- Rector: Prof. Dr. Akın Levent
- Faculty: 12
- Administrative staff: 1570
- Students: 25000+
- Location: Erzincan, Turkey
- Website: Official website

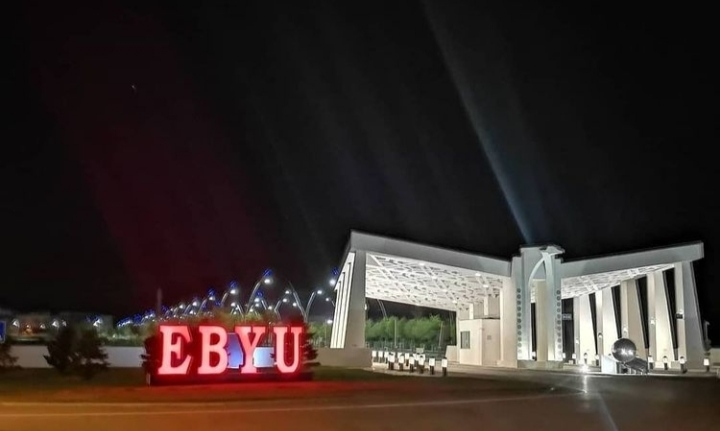
Erzincan Binali Yıldırım University (EBYU)

Erzincan Binali Yıldırım University is a university in Erzincan, Turkey, with more than 25,000 students. It has 12 faculties and 12 high schools (tertiary education).

It was established on March 1, 2006, from a number of existing schools. The education school was established in 1967 and the law school was established in 1987. The university plans to offer a program in cemetery management.

Erzincan Binali Yıldırım University; The year 2020 was among the top 2 thousand universities in the ranking created by the CWUR-Center from World University Rankings. It entered the first 6.8 percent among 20 thousand universities in the ranking.

It is among the first thousand universities in the "Worldwide University Rankings" category, which is determined by U.S. News & World Report every year according to various scientific criteria.

== President ==
- Erdoğan Büyükkasap 2007-2010
- İlyas Çapoğlu 2010-2018
- Akın Levent 2018-....

The former president, Erdoğan Büyükkasap, appointed in 2007, was found dead on March 18, 2010, apparently having committed suicide.

== Academic divisions ==
=== Faculties ===
- Faculty of Law
- Faculty of Medicine
- Faculty of Pharmacy
- Faculty of Dentistry
- Faculty of Art
- Faculty of Sports Science
- Faculty of Education
- Faculty of Economics and Administrative Sciences
- Faculty of Engineering
- Faculty of Theology
- Faculty of Health Sciences
- Faculty of fine arts

=== Institutes ===
- Institute of Applied Sciences
- Institute of Social Sciences
- Institute of Health Sciences
- Institute of Earthquake Technologies

=== Research Institutes and Coordinatorships ===
- Computer Science Research and Application Institute
- East Anatolia Earthquake Research and Training Coordinatorship
- Turkish Peoples Research and Application Coordinatorship
- Strategic Research Coordinatorship
- Biological Diversity Research and Application Coordinatorship
- Yukarı Fırat Havzası Research and Application Coordinatorship (YUFHAK)
- Erzincan Teknokent Coordinatorship
- MEYOK Coordinatorship
- Project Education Coordinatorship
- Training of Strategic Development Coordinatorship
- International Relations Coordinatorship

== Affiliations ==
The university is a member of the Caucasus University Association.

== Gallery ==
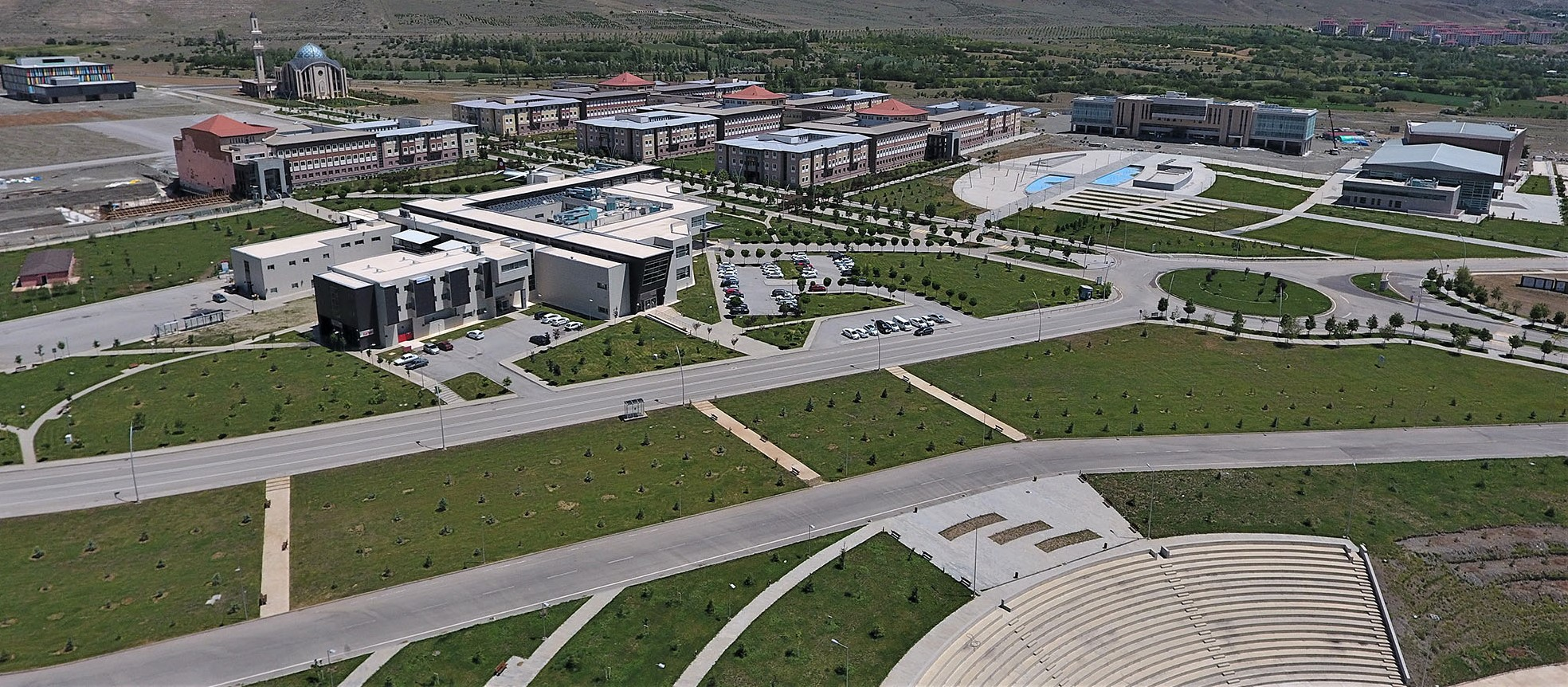
Yalnızbağ Campus

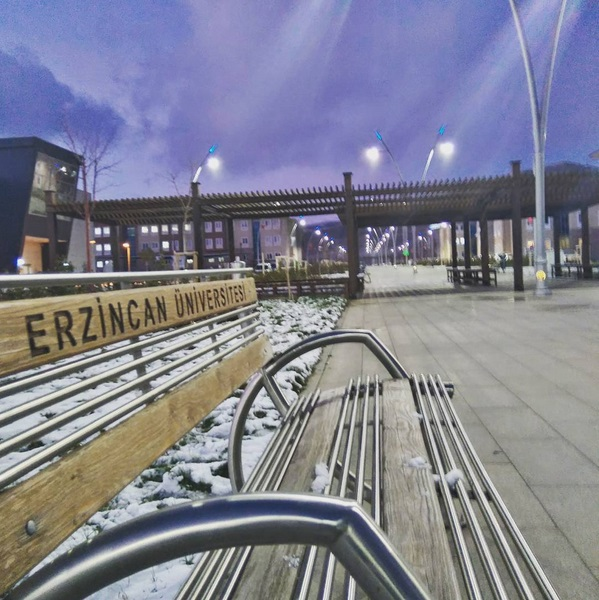
Yalnızbağ Campus

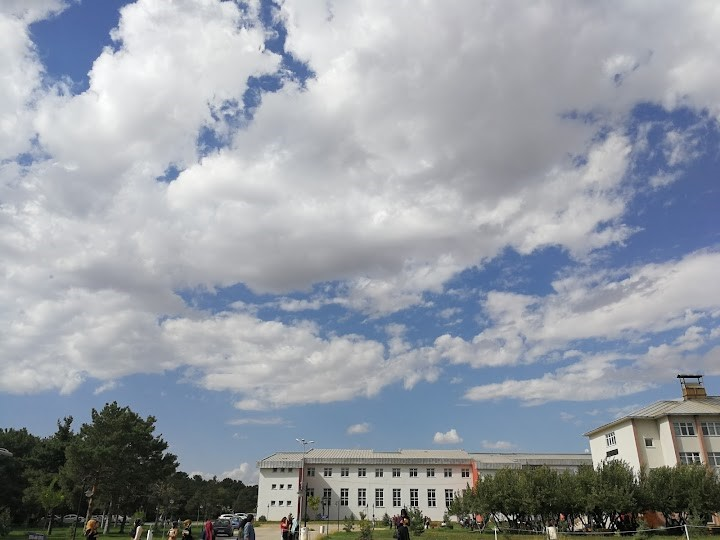
Faculty of Law

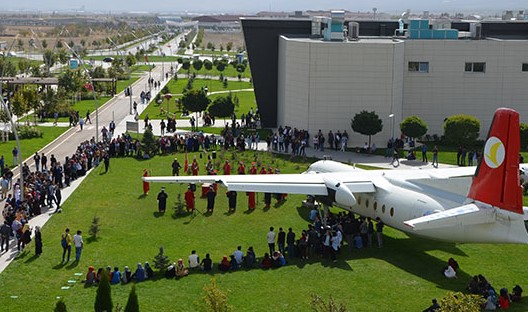
Yalnızbağ

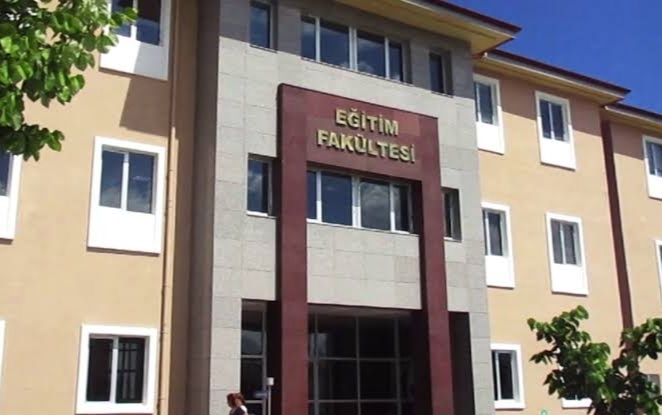
Faculty of Education

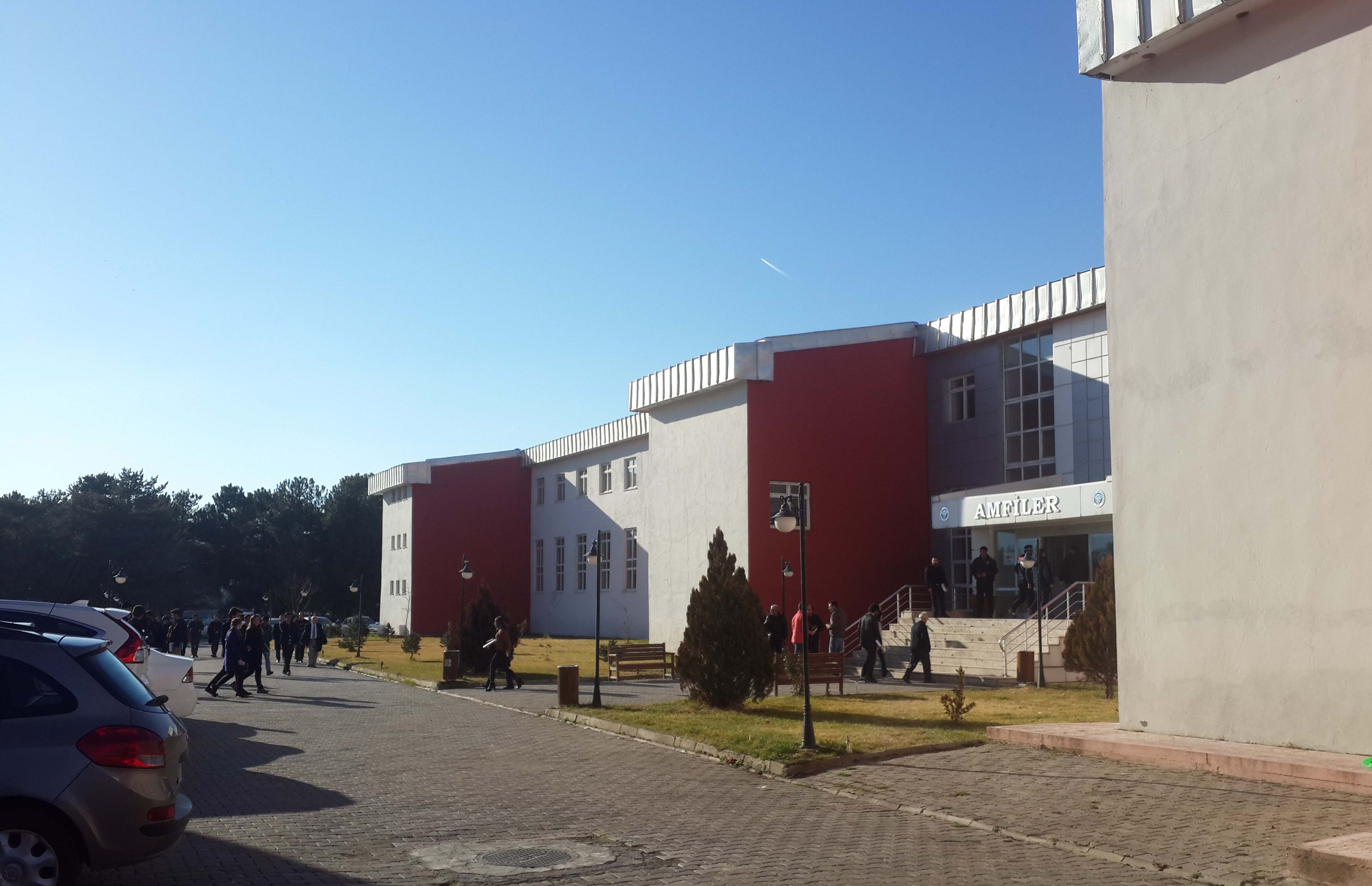
Law Campus

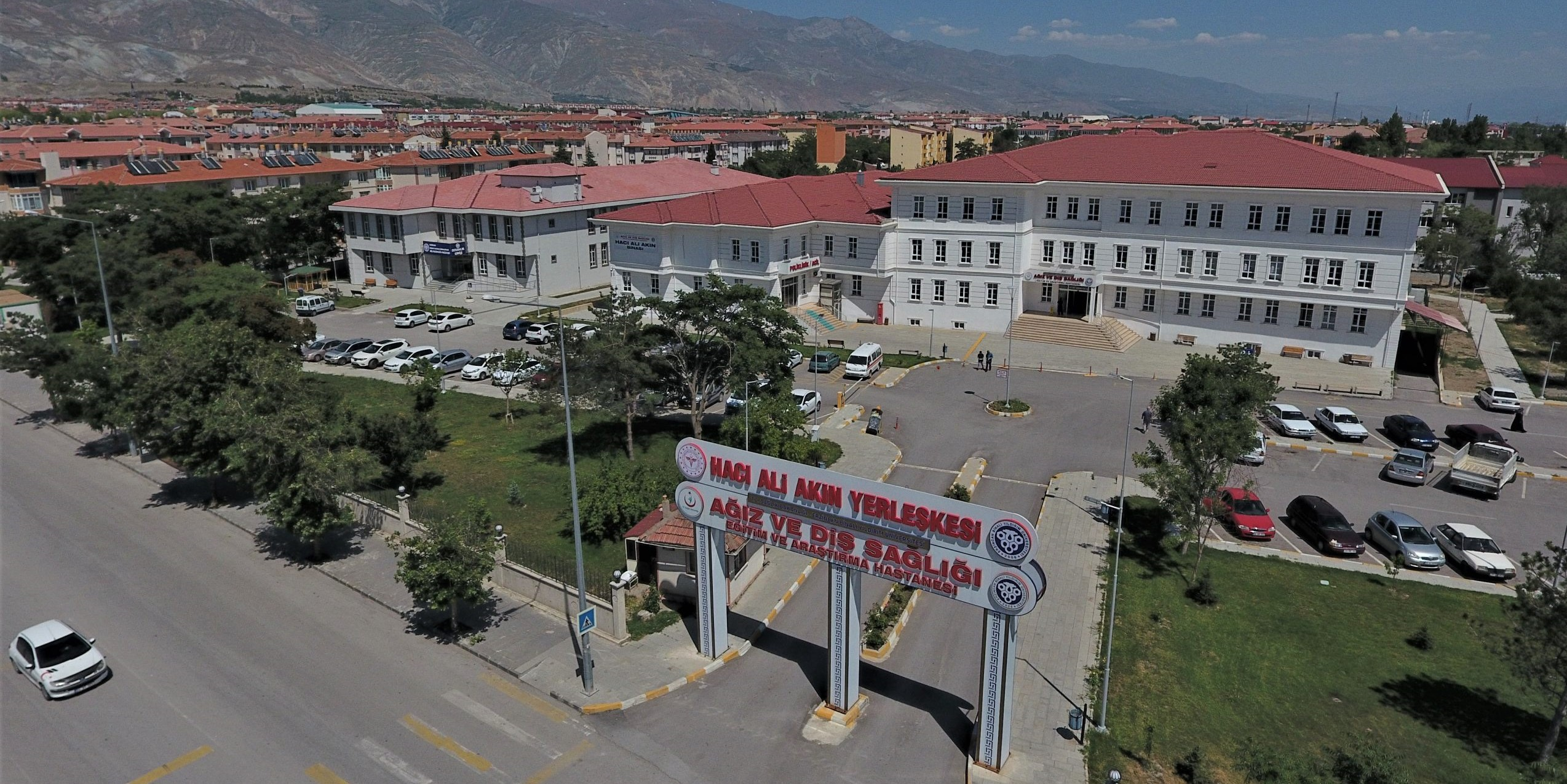
Hacı Ali Akın Campus

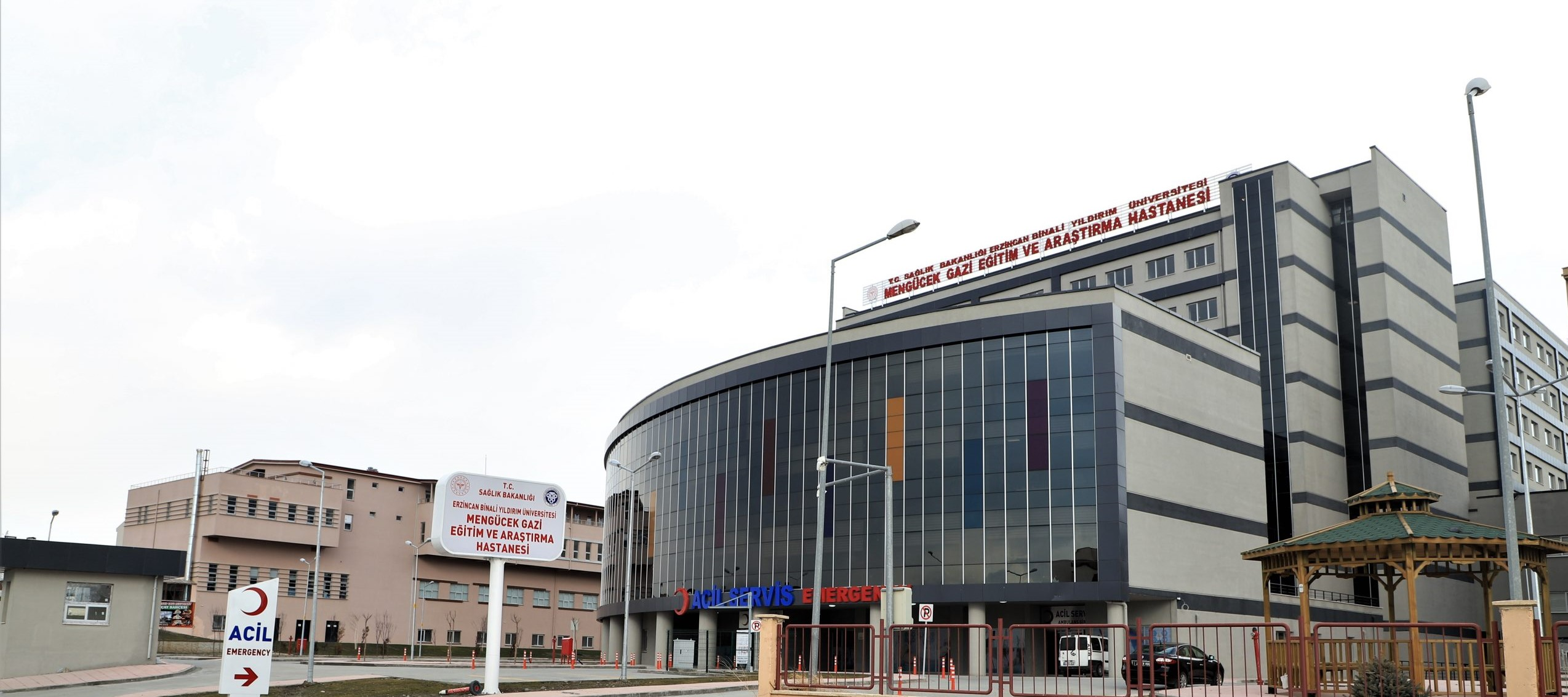
Mengücek Gazi training and research Hospital
