= Nermin Gözükırmızı =

Tutkish academic, scientist and researcher

- Born: Nermin Gözükırmızı; 18 June 1951; Izmit, Turkey
- Occupations: Scientist, Genetics, Biotechnology

Nermin Gözükırmızı, scientific advisor and professor in Istanbul University, was born on June 18, 1951, in İzmit, Turkey.

She enrolled in the Department of Botany-Zoology in Istanbul University in 1967 and graduated in 1972. She started as a PhD student at Department of Botanic and Genetic, PhD thesis entitled: Effects of some chemicals and rays on Vicia faba (the mentor: Prof. Dr. Emine Bilge), defended in 1979.

She started at Department of Biology in Istanbul University as an associate professor in 1985 and became a professor in 1992. Professor Nermin Gözükırmızı has been working at Department of Molecular Biology and Genetics since 2003.

Nermin Gözükırmızı is Academic Member of Istanbul University since 1972. She took part for Establishment of Plant Biotechnology Research Unit at TÜBİTAK Marmara Research Center, Research Institute for Genetic Engineering and Biotechnology (RIGEB), 1992–2006. 1992–2006. She also had an active role in the establishment of Molecular Biology and Genetics Department at Istanbul University. Her areas of research include plant tissue culture systems and gene transfer, polymorphism and molecular markers, GMO analysis and biosafety and epigenetics. She teaches undergraduate and graduate level courses on these subjects.

She has performed much research with different plant species such as barley, wheat, potatoes, cicer, poplar, cotton and she is an author or co-author of numerous scientific papers (65) and several book chapters (20). Her recent internationally published scientific papers are related to retrotransposons, gene transfers and salt tolerance.

Nermin Gözükırmızı supervised 20 MSc and 20 PhD theses, and her students (assistant professors, associate professors and professors) contribute valuable information to scientists in Turkey and other countries.

== See also ==
- TÜBİTAK Marmara Research Center
