= Ahmet Şimşirgil =

Turkish academic (born 1959)

Prof. Dr. Ahmet Şimşirgil
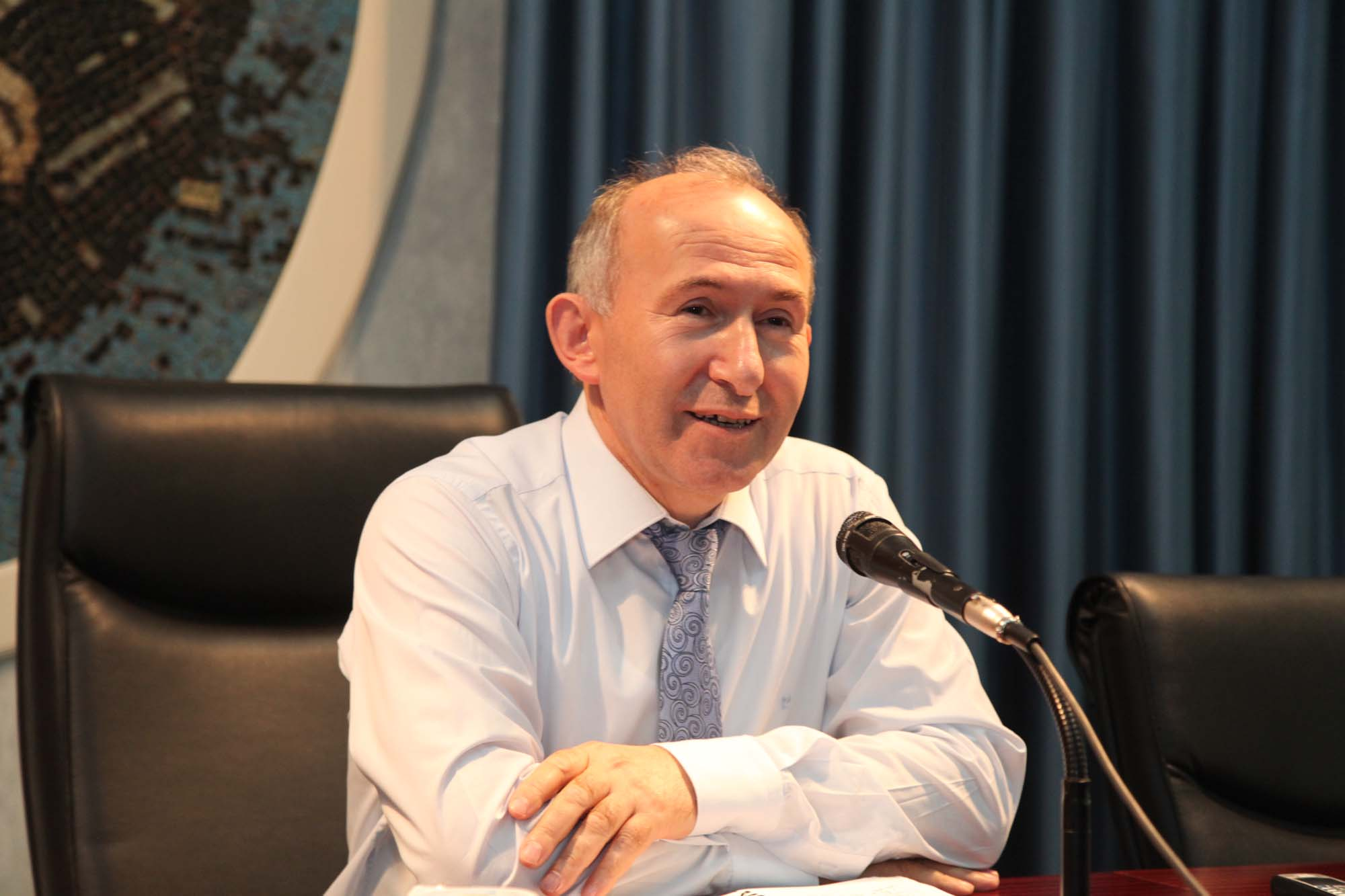
- Şimşirgil in May 2012
- Born: 25 May 1959; Boyabat, Sinop, Turkey
- Education: Atatürk University; Marmara University
- Scientific career
- Fields: Turkic history
- Thesis: Osmanlı Taşra Teşkilatı’nda Tokat (1455-1574) (1990)
- Doctoral advisor: Mustafa Çetin Varlık
- Website: ahmetsimsirgil.com

Ahmet Şimşirgil is a Turkish academic.

== Biography ==
He was born in Boyabat, Sinop, Turkey in 1959 and he grew up there. In 1978 he entered Atatürk University, Literature Faculty History Department in Erzurum, Turkey where he graduated in 1982. In 1983 he began work as a research assistant in the Yeniçağ Department of the same university completing his master‘s degree in 1985. In 1989 he moved to Istanbul Marmara University, Faculty of Science and Literature in the History Department.

With his 1990 book “Osmanlı Taşra Teşkilatı’nda Tokat (1455-1574)”, he was awarded a Doctorate and earned Associate Professor status in 1997 after writing his thesis “Uyvar’ın Osmanlılar Tarafından Fethi ve İdaresi”. Şimşirgil, who became a professor in 2003, has published articles and books about Ottoman history, politic life and governance. He is a contributing writer for the daily newspaper Türkiye and appears on several television programs including “Tarih ve Medeniyet”, “Başka Şeyleri”, "Tarih ve İnsan" on both Lalegül TV and TGRT Radio and "Tarih Sahnesi" on TRT1 TV.

Şimşirgil is a Professor of Ottoman History in the Faculty of Science and Literature at Marmara University in Istanbul. He is married with three children.

== Critics ==
Şimşirgil is under criticism in Germany, because he expressed homophobic and anti-Israeli views.

== Published works ==
=== Books ===
1- Kayı I – Ertuğrul’un Ocağı (Timaş Yayınları) ISBN 978-605-08-1296-1

2- Kayı II – Cihan Devleti (Timaş Yayınları) ISBN 978-605-08-1294-7

3- Kayı III – Haremeyn Hizmetinde (Timaş Yayınları) ISBN 978-605-08-1298-5

4- Kayı IV – Ufukların Sultanı Kanuni (Timaş Yayınları) ISBN 978-605-08-1303-6

5- Kayı V – Kudret ve Azamet Yılları (Timaş Yayınları) ISBN 978-605-08-1301-2

6- Kayı VI – İmparatorluğun Zirvesi ve Dönüş (Timaş Yayınları) ISBN 978-605-08-1778-2

7- Kayı VII – Kutsal İttifaka Karşı (Timaş Yayınları) ISBN 978-605-08-2063-8

8- Kayı VIII – Islahat, Darbe ve Devlet (Timaş Yayınları) ISBN 978-605-08-2380-6

9- Kayı IX – Sonun Başlangıcı (Timaş Yayınları) ISBN 978-605-08-2604-3

10- Kayı X – II. Abdülhamid Han (Timaş Yayınları) ISBN 978-605-08-2778-8

11- Kayı XI – Elveda Vahideddin Han (Timaş Yayınları) ISBN 978-605-08-3027-9

12- Valide Sultanlar ve Harem (Timaş Yayınları) ISBN 978-605-08-1616-7

13- Denizler Fatihi Piyale Paşa ve Cerbe Zaferi (Timaş Yayınları) ISBN 978-605-08-2020-1

14- İstanbul, Fetih ve Fatih (İBB. Kültür A.Ş. Yayınları) ISBN 978-605-91-3274-9

15- Fethin Kahramanları (İBB Kültür A.Ş. Yayınları)ISBN 978-605-91-3213-8

16- Ahmed Cevdet Paşa ve Mecelle (co-authored with Ekrem Buğra Ekinci) (Beylik Yayınları) ISBN 978-605-98-9601-6

17- Devr-i Gül Sohbetleri (Beylik Yayınları) ISBN 978-605-98-9602-3

18- Slovakya’da Osmanlılar (Beylik Yayınları) ISBN 978-605-98-9606-1

19- Bir Müstakil Dünya: Topkapı Sarayı (Timaş Yayınları) ISBN 978-605-08-2189-5

20- Kaptan Paşa’nın Seyir Defteri (BKY Yayınları) ISBN 978-975-84-8624-3

21- Otağ -I- Büyük Doğuş (Timaş Yayınları) ISBN 978-605-08-2531-2

22- Otağ -II- Emir Timur (Timaş Yayınları) ISBN 978-605-08-2533-6

23- Otağ -III- Sultan Alparslan (Timaş Yayınları) ISBN 978-605-08-2990-7

24- Eşrefoğlu Rûmî (IQ Kültür Sanat Yayıncılık) ISBN 978-975-25-5440-5

25- Osmanlı Gerçekleri I (Timaş Yayınları) ISBN 978-605-08-2266-3

26- Osmanlı Gerçekleri II (Timaş Yayınları) ISBN 978-605-08-2764-4

27- Sultan II. Kılıç Arslan ve Aksaray (IQ Kültür Sanat Yayıncılık) ISBN 978-975-25-5443-6

28- Asırlara Hitab Eden Alim Osman Hulusi Efendi (Nasihat Yayınları) ISBN 978-994-47-7435-2

29- Adalet Ustaları (co-authored with Pelin Çift) (Destek Yayınları) ISBN 978-605-31-1341-6

30- En Sevgili Efendimiz ve Sevdalıları (Timaş Yayınları) ISBN 978-605-08-3315-7

31- Barbaros Hayreddin Paşa (Timaş Yayınları) ISBN 978-605-08-3536-6

32- Mızraklı Hakikat (KTB Yayınları) ISBN 978-605-70034-1-6

33- Edep Yâ Hû (KTB Yayınları) ISBN 978-605-70034-0-9

=== Articles published in the National Journal ===
1- “Osmanlı Taşra Teşkilatında Rum Beylerbeyiliği”, Türklük Araştırmaları Dergisi, 5, 289-299 (1990).

2- “XVI. Yüzyılda Tokat Medreseleri” Tarih İncelemeleri Dergisi, VII, 227-242 (1992).

3- “Osmanlılar İdaresinde Zile Şehri (1455-1574)”, Türklük Araştırmaları Dergisi, 6, 231-243 (1991).

4- “XV ve XVI. Asırlarda Turhal”, Türklük Araştırmaları Dergisi, 8, 463-494 (1997).

5- “Osmanlılar İdaresinde Uyvar’ın Hazine Defterleri ve Bir Bütçe Örneği”, Güney Doğu Avrupa Araştırmaları Dergisi, 12, 325-355 (1998).

6- “XVI. Yüzyılda Amasya Şehri”, Tarih İncelemeleri Dergisi, XI, 77-109 (1996).

7- “Economic Life in Nove Zamky (Uyvar) During The Ottoman Period (1663-1683)” Foundation For Middle East And Balkan Studies (OBİV), Turkish Review of Balkan Studies, Annual 2001.

8- “The Kazas (townships) of Alakilise, Rahova, Ivraca, Izladi and Eski Cuma Subdivisions of the Sancak of Niğbolu in the Eighteenth Century”, Foundation For Middle East And Balkan Studies (OBİV), Turkish Review of Balkan Studies, Annual 2003.

=== Papers presented at international conferences ===
1- Uyvar Eyaleti’nin Teşkili ve İdaresi, Uluslararası Osmanlı Tarihi Sempozyumu, (8-9 Nisan1999), İzmir.

2- 1663 Uyvar Sefer Yolu ve Şehrin Osmanlı İdaresindeki Konumu, Anadolu’da Tarihi Yollar ve Şehirler Semineri, Bildiriler, 79-98, İstanbul 2002

- Ahmet Şimşirgil (2003) Birincil kaynaklardan Osmanlı tarihi ('Primary Sources of Ottoman History'): Kayı, Volume 1, Ertuğrul’un Ocağı, ISBN 978-994452570-1
- Ahmet Şimşirgil (2004), Birincil kaynaklardan Osmanlı tarihi (Primary Sources of Ottoman History): Kayı, Volume 2, Şems, ISBN 978-9944-304-00-9
- Murādī; Ahmet Şimşirgil (2003), Gazavât-i Hayreddin Pașa, Babıali Kültür Yayıncılığı, ISBN 978-975-8486-24-3
