= Erdoğan Büyükkasap =

Turkish scientist and academic (1962-2010)

- Born: 3 February 1962; Tosya, Kastamonu
- Died: 18 March 2010 (aged 48)
- Education: Atatürk University
- Occupations: scientist and academic

Erdoğan Büyükkasap (3 February 1962 – 18 March 2010) was a Turkish scientist and academic. He was president of Erzincan University, a university in Erzincan, Turkey.

Büyükkasap was born in Tosya, Kastamonu, Turkey, on 3 February 1962. He received a bachelor's degree in 1983 and a master's degree in 1988 from Atatürk University. He became an associate professor at the university in 1994 and a full professor in 1999. He was later appointed as a dean. He was appointed by Ahmet Necdet Sezer who was president until 2007. He was married and had one son and one daughter.

He was found dead on 18 March 2010 in the house provided for him by the government, apparently having hanged himself.
