= Şule Kut =

Turkish academic

Şule Kut is the Rector of Okan University. Until 2010, she worked in Istanbul Bilgi University as a professor in International Relations, specifically on Turkish politics and the Balkans. She had been the Dean of the Faculty of Economics and Administrative Sciences in Bilgi University; and for 1999-2005 she was the Vice-Rector there. She has double B.A. degrees with Political Science and International Relations and Business Administration from Boğaziçi University, and master's and PhD (1987) degrees from the Binghamton University.

== Selected publications ==
Among her books are:

- Bağımsızlığın İlk Yılları: Azerbaycan, Kazakistan, Kırgızistan, Özbekistan, Türkmenistan (1994),
- Dağılan Yugoslavya ve Bosna-Hersek: Olaylar-Belgeler 1990-1996 (1997),
- En Uzun On Yıl: Türkiye’nin Ulusal Güvenlik ve Dış Politika Gündeminde Doksanlar (1998, 2000)
- Balkanlar'da Kimlik ve Egemenlik (2005)
