= Fikri Cantürk =

Turkish painter and academic (1933–2019)

- Born: 7 February 1933; Karalar Village, Ankara, Turkey
- Died: 30 April 2019 (aged 86); Eskişehir, Turkey
- Education: Gazi Institution of Education, Department of Painting
- Known for: Painting, Drawing, Sculpture, Writing
- Awards: 1975 “Special Jury Award” in the 5th DYO Exhibition; 1976 The award of achievement in the 37th State Painting and Sculpture Exhibition; 1977 “Mention of Honor” in the 11th DYO Exhibition; 1982 The award of achievement in the 41st State Painting and Sculpture Exhibition; 1981 Award for the First-Runner-Up in the Competition Organized by the Ministry of Culture on the subject “The War of Independence and The Revolutions of Atatürk” on the 100th anniversary of Atatürk’ s Birthday; 1985 Award in the 19th DYO Exhibition; 1986 “The Mention of Honor” in the Competition Organized by the Turkish Grand National Assembly on the Subject “National Sovereignty and Peace”; 1987 The award of achievement in the 48th State Painting and Sculpture Exhibition; 1987 The mention of Honor in the TAPO Atatürk the 6th Painting Competition; 2002 Gazi University, 75 Years in Education “Plate of Honor”; 2007 Eskişehir Art Association, “Art Incentive Reward”; 2010 Eskişehir Art Association, “Reward of Exertion in Art”; 2011 BRHD 40. Years “Honor Award”
- Website: http://www.fikricanturk.com

Fikri Cantürk (7 February 1933 – 30 April 2019) was a Turkish painter and academic.

== Biography ==
Born in the village Karalar, Ankara, Fikri CANTÜRK completed his primary education attending the school “Eğitmenli” in his home town for the first three years and Hasanoğlu Village Institute Application Primary School for the remaining two years. He graduated from Hasanoğlu Village Institute in 1952. In the same year he was appointed to Koparan Village Primary School, which is nearby Ankara as the “School Principal”. He attended the Department of Painting, Gazi Institution of Education in 1954 and in 1957 he earned his degree. In 1957, he was appointed to Van-Emis (Alparslan) Teacher Training School. In 1958 he started Officer Cadet School. From 1958 to 1959, he completed his military service as a reserve officer in Mersin Petty Officer School. He worked as a teacher in Beşikdüzü Girls Teacher Training School from 1959 to 1960, in Trabzon High School in 1961 and in Ordu-Perşembe Teacher Training School from 1962 to 1965.

Cantürk died in Eskişehir on 30 April 2019, at the age of 86.

== Academic career ==
Cantürk was sent to France by the Ministry of Education in 1965. During 1965 and 1966, he did some research, investigation and works of art in Paris. In the same years he made some studies in Dijon Teacher Training School and with a couple of friends opened an exhibition in Dijon University.

When he was back in Turkey in 1967, he was appointed to Kütahya Girls’ Teacher Training School, and worked there as the chief of the workshop and the chief of education. In 1970, Mr. Cantürk was appointed to Samsun Institute of Education, where took part in the foundation of the Department of Painting and worked there as the head of the department for 10 years. Fikri Cantürk was rusticated from the university in the period of the Fascist Military Coup d’état on September 12, 1980. In 1983, he earned his bachelor's degree from the Department of Painting, which was later joined to Ondokuz Mayıs University.

From 1985 to 1988 he worked in Hacettepe University Fine Arts Faculty as a part-time academician.

He became an associate professor in 1987 and made a comeback to work for the Department of Painting in the Faculty of Education, Anadolu University. In 1992, he was appointed as the head of the department and worked there until his retirement. He became the professor in 1993. Mr. Cantürk, who retired in 1998, is still working in his studio in Eskişehir.

As well as focusing on painting recently, Mr. CANTÜRK has not only been concerned with sculpture but also literature. Among his sculpture studies “ATATURK MONUMENT” in the gardens of Kütahya Girls’ Teacher Training School (1967) and Atatürk Primary School (1968) can be pointed out.

== Published articles and books ==
- Ninety-nine Pigeons and One Olive, (Poems) 1961,
- My Hands (Poems) 1963,
- Fundamental Problems in Plastic Arts, Anadolu University Publications. 1992,
- Introduction to Arts and Esthetics (The Publication he was the Editor of) Anadolu University Publications 1993.
- Slums- Homes of Misery -1962, (Milliyet Newspaper article contest organized in the name for Ali Naci Karacan)
- Analysis of Sait Faik Stories (Research Article prepared with Güven Kalafat), Varlık Periodical, Issue: 604 155 August 1963

== Selections from works of art are in ==
Ankara Painting and Sculpture Museum, Denizli, Mersin Painting and Sculpture Museum, Anadolu University Museum of Modern Arts, Ministry of Culture, TRT, Ziraat, İş, Halk Bank, DYO, Presidency of General Staff Collections. Apart from all these, he has many works of art in official and private collections both in Turkey and in abroad.

== Some of the exhibitions participated in ==
In Turkey;

- State Painting and Sculpture Exhibitions
- DYO Exhibitions
- Exhibitions of the society of United Artists and Sculpture
- Exhibitions of the Artist graduated from Teacher Training Institute
- Many others including the Exhibitions by the group Art Again 2000

In Abroad;

- 5th, 7th and 11th Monaco The Modern Plastic Arts Exhibition
- The 3rd Biennial by Balkan Peace and Friendship District as representative of Turkey in 1982
- Exhibitions organized in Germany, Austria, Kuwait, as representative of Turkey
- The year of Japan and Turkey, Examples from Contemporary Turkish Painting in 2003

== Awards received ==
- 1971 “Special Jury Award” in the 5th DYO Exhibition
- 1976 The award of achievement in the 37th State Painting and Sculpture Exhibition
- 1977 “Mention of Honor” in the 11th DYO Exhibition
- 1982 The award of achievement in the 41st State Painting and Sculpture Exhibition
- 1981 Award for the First-Runner-Up in the Competition Organized by the Ministry of Culture on the subject “The War of Independence and The Revolutions of Atatürk” on the 100th anniversary of Atatürk’ s Birthday
- 1985 Award in the 19th DYO Exhibition
- 1986 “The Mention of Honor” in the Competition Organized by the Turkish Grand National Assembly on the Subject “National Sovereignty and Peace”
- 1987 The award of achievement in the 48th State Painting and Sculpture Exhibition
- 1987 The mention of Honor in the TAPO Atatürk the 6th Painting Competition
- 2002 Gazi University, 75 Years in Education “Plate of Honor”
- 2007 Eskişehir Art Association, “Art Incentive Reward”
- 2010 Eskişehir Art Association, “Reward of Exertion in Art”
- 2011 BRHD 40. Years “Honor Award”

== Exhibitions held ==
- 1963 Poetry Exhibition visually and audibly supported- SAMSUN
- 1965 Poetry Exhibition visually and audibly supported- ORDU
- 1970 State Gallery of Fine Arts- ANKARA
- 1986 Mige Art Gallery- ANKARA
- 1987 Doku Art Gallery- ANKARA
- 1988 Dönüşüm Art Gallery- ANKARA
- 1991 Armoni Art Gallery- ANKARA
- 1993 Emlak Bank Art Gallery- ANKARA
- 1993 Palet Art Gallery- ISTANBUL
- 1999 Doku Art Gallery- ANKARA
- 1999 Boyut Art Gallery- ANKARA
- 2000 Gallery Soyut- ANKARA
- 2001 Gallery Soyut- ANKARA
- 2002 Sergi Art Gallery- ANKARA
- 2003 Skala Art Gallery- ESKİŞEHIR
- 2003 Istanbul Security Exchange Art Gallery- ANKARA
- 2003 Soyut Art Gallery- ANKARA
- 2004 İMKB Ankara Art Galery, ANKARA
- 2004 Art Fair (AKM), İSTANBUL
- 2005 Art Fair (AKM), ANKARA
- 2005 Ege Art (AKM), İZMİR
- 2006 State Gallery of Fine Arts- ESKISEHIR
- 2007 Gallery Soyut- ANKARA
- 2007 Vestel Art Gallery, ESKİŞEHİR
- 2008 Gallery G&G- ANKARA
- 2010 Gallery G&G- ANKARA
- 2011 Gallery G&G- ANKARA
