= Ekonomist (Turkey) =

- Categories: News magazine
- Frequency: Weekly
- Founded: 1960
- Company: Doğan Burda Media Group
- Based in: Istanbul, Turkey
- Website: www.ekonomist.com.tr
- OCLC: 463616989

Ekonomist is a Turkish-language weekly news and international affairs publication. The magazine was started in 1960. It was formerly owned by Doğan Media Group which is renamed as Doğan Burda Media Group. It is headquartered in Istanbul.

Ekonomist has awarded "Business People of the Year" awards since the early 1990s.

Together with the monthly Capital it runs a "CEO Club" with around 500 members.
