= Serap Yazıcı =

Turkish academic of Constitutional Law (born 1963)

Prof. Dr. Serap Yazıcı

Member of the Grand National Assembly of Turkey
- Incumbent
- Assumed office 2 June 2023

Personal details
- Born: 1963 (age 62–63) Ankara, Turkey
- Party: Justice and Development Party (from 2025)
- Other political affiliations: Republican People's Party (2001–2003); Future Party (2019–2025); Felicity Party (2023–2025, parliamentary group); New Path (2025)
- Education: Ankara University, Law School
- Occupation: Academic

Serap Yazıcı (born 1963 in Ankara, Turkey) is a Turkish politician and academic of Constitutional Law. She was a member of a committee tasked with drafting a proposal for the new constitution of Turkey.

She was elected to the Grand National Assembly of Turkey from Antalya in the 2023 Turkish parliamentary election. Although she was member of the Future Party, she was elected from the Republican People's Party list. However, She resigned from the Future Party on February 22, 2025. She joined the AKP on February 23, 2025.

== Early years ==
At the age of thirteen, she lost her eyesight in a car accident with her family, at which her mother was killed.

She was educated in the Faculty of Law at Ankara University, and graduated earning a bachelor's degree in 1984. In 1995, Yazıcı completed her postgraduate studies at the same university, and obtained the title Doctor of Law.

== Career ==
In 1998, Yazıcı was appointed professor of Constitutional Law in the Faculty of Law at Istanbul Bilgi University, where she served until 2012. She used to be a faculty member at Istanbul Şehir University.

She was a member of the six-person committee tasked by the then prime minister Recep Tayyip Erdoğan with drafting a proposal for the new constitution of Turkey.

She has been critical of the constitution drafted after the 1980 Turkish coup d'état, saying "In the Turkish judicial system, the number of rulings that were based on the principle of objectivity would most likely be in the minority".
