= Necla Pur =

Turkish economist and professor (born 1943)

- Born: 23 November 1943 (age 82); Ankara, Turkey
- Known for: Rectorate of Marmara University
- Scientific career
- Fields: Economics
- Institutions: Marmara University

Necla Pur (born 23 November 1943) is a Turkish economist, scholar, and professor. She is the former rector of Marmara University.
