= List of journalists killed in Turkey =

Following the killing of Armenian journalist Hrant Dink in Istanbul on 19 January 2007 various lists of journalists killed in Turkey since the early 20th century were published. One such list was published by the Turkish Association of Journalists (tr: Türkiye Gazeteciler Cemiyeti). It contains 68 names of journalists killed between 1909 and 2022. A "Platform of imprisoned journalists" published a list in April 2012 that contained 112 names. Yet, it is difficult to obtain detailed information in particular on early cases, in order to determine whether the deaths had been assassinations directly linked to the profession of the victims.

It also appears that some people were not journalists by profession, but affiliated to certain publications as readers, vendors or even part-time publishers of political comments. These people will not be included in the lists, apart from people who were killed because they distributed certain publications.

In some cases, the state has been involved in the deaths of Kurdish journalists.

== Killings until September 1980 ==
Only few cases of journalists killed in Turkey between the foundation of the Republic and the military coup of 12 September 1980 were listed. Yet, some of these killings were high-profile assassinations that contributed to the atmosphere of political violence (often termed "civil war") that the Turkish army used as the main reason for its intervention. A bit more information is available on some of the 15 cases reported for this period:

Name	Publication	Place	Date	Remarks
Hikmet Şevket			1930	
Sabahattin Ali	Marko Paşa	Edirne	2 April 1948	listed under writers
Hüseyin Şen	KAWA	Istanbul	21 March 1978	He was the editor-in-chief of the journal and member of a Kurdish newspaper. He was allegedly tortured and killed in Selimiye (Istanbul) military prison.
Gani Bozarslan	Aydınlık		10 May 1978	Translated books from Kurdish to Turkish
Ali İhsan Özgür	Politika	Istanbul	21 November 1978	Politika was first issued by DİSK and later by the TKP. Ali İhsan Özgür disappeared so that the family had difficulties in identifying him.
Cengiz Polatkan	Hafta Sonu	Ankara	1 December 1978	
Abdi İpekçi	Milliyet	Istanbul	1 February 1979	Two members of the ultra-nationalist Grey Wolves, Oral Çelik and Mehmet Ali Ağca (who later shot pope John Paul II), murdered Abdi İpekçi in his car on the way back home from his office in front of his apartment building in Istanbul. Ağca was caught due to an informant and was sentenced to life in prison. After serving six months in a military prison in Istanbul, Ağca escaped with the help of military officer.
İlhan Darendelioğlu	Ortadoğu	Istanbul	19 November 1979	Member of the MHP, see tr:İlhan Egemen Darendelioğlu
İsmail Gerçeksöz	Ortadoğu	Istanbul	4 April 1980	Also published books
Ümit Kaftancıoğlu	TRT	Istanbul	11 April 1980	Right-wing Ahmet Mustafa Kıvılcım stated in his interrogation by the police that he killed Ümit Kaftancıoğlu, because he was a "leftist", but later rejected the statement. He remained four months in pre-trial detention and was released. The assailants were not found.
Muzaffer Fevzioğlu	Hizmet	Trabzon	15 April 1980	
Hayrabet Honca	Halkın Birliği	Kayseri	1 May 1980	Member of TKP/ML Hareketi, killed by right-wingers
Recai Ünal	Demokrat	Istanbul	22 July 1980	Allegedly kidnapped and tortured

== Killings in the 1980s and 1990s with laicist journalists as targets ==
After the military coup of 1980 fewer journalists were killed in the fight between the radical left and the extreme right. After the end of the 1980s there have been several killings of journalists known for their anti-government attitude and secular (in Turkey also termed laicist). In some cases members of radical Islamic organizations have been prosecuted and condemned for these killings. In one case a militant of the PKK allegedly confessed to such a killing. Other killings in the 1980s and 1990s include:

Name	Publication	Place	Date	Remarks
Mevlüt Işıt	Türkiye	Ankara	1 June 1988	
Kamil Başaran	Gazete	Istanbul	28 February 1989	Shot by the owner of a restaurant, who did not like his way of reporting.
Seracettin Müftüoğlu	Hürriyet	Nusaybin	29 June 1989	
Sami Başaran	Gazete	Istanbul	7 November 1989	He had an interview with the leader of a Kurdish tribe from Mardin in his office in Aksaray (Istanbul), where he was shot
Çetin Emeç	Hürriyet	Istanbul	7 March 1990	Two people entered his car and shot him and his driver Sinan Ercan. Four members of the Islamic Movement Organization (tr: İslami Hareket Örgütü were sentenced to life imprisonment, but his brother does not believe that the true killers were caught.
Turan Dursun	2000'e Doğru	Istanbul	4 September 1990	A member of the Islamic Movement Organization (tr: İslami Hareket Örgütü was sentenced to life imprisonment, but the person believed to be his killer remains free.
Uğur Mumcu	Cumhuriyet	Ankara	24 January 1993	While different hypothesis exist on who was behind the killing the prosecutor's office in Ankara maintains that two assassins were sentenced and a case opened against the third suspect, all three of them being members of the Tawhid-Salaam Jerusalem Organization (tr: Tevhid-Selam Kudüs) that was allegedly behind the murder.
Onat Kutlar	Cumhuriyet	Istanbul	11 January 1995	The brother of the archaeologist Yasemin Cebenoyan, who had died in the same bomb attack, complained that many people thought the murder had not been solved or that an Islamic organization was behind it. He was convicted in 2005, but as a confessor was released after 9.5 years' imprisonment. The attack was later revealed to be carried out by the PKK.
Ahmet Taner Kışlalı	Cumhuriyet	Ankara	21 October 1999	His death as well as the killings of Uğur Mumcu, Prof. Dr. Ahmet Taner Kışlalı, Prof. Dr. Muammer Aksoy and Assistant Professor Dr. Bahriye Üçok were the subject of a trial at Ankara Heavy Penal Court 11 known as the Umut (Hope) case. The court ruled that the defendants had formed an illegal organization by the name of "Kudüs Ordusu" (Jerusalem Army) and "Tevhid Selam" (Tawhid-Salaam) and had committed violent acts in Turkey. On 28 July 2005 one defendant was sentenced to life imprisonment, while seven others received sentences as leaders or members of an illegal organization. The Court of Cassation confirmed the sentence of the main suspect on 11 November 2006.

== Journalists and vendors killed in the Kurdish-Turkish conflict ==
In the 1990s the Kurdish-Turkish conflict became harsher with a large number of casualties on both sides. At the same time more and more civilians fell victim to extrajudicial killings, murders by unknown assailants (tr: faili meçhul), a term used in Turkish to indicate that the perpetrators were not identified because of them being protected by the State and cases of disappearance. Soon after the pro-Kurdish press had started to publish the first daily newspaper by the name of "Özgür Gündem" (Free Agenda) killings of Kurdish journalists started. In many cases, the state was blamed for murders and in some cases the Turkish variety of the radical Islamic organization Hizbullah was made responsible for the killings, in others the PKK was accused, but the majority remained without a clear indication to the persons behind the fatal attacks. Hardly any of them has been clarified or resulted in sanctions for the assailants. Among the 33 journalists that were killed in the first half of the 1990s are also cases not related to the Kurdish conflict. In 2008, the European Court of Human Right condemned Turkey for executing and assassinating Kurdish journalists and writers. Musa Anter, a prominent Kurdish writer, was killed by JİTEM in 1992.

Among Kurdish patriots (tr: yurtsever, often used as an acronym for sympathizers of the PKK by the state) the "tradition" that started with Özgür Gündem is often called "history of the free press". In this context the figure of 76 victims (called martyrs of the press; tr: basın şehitleri) is often mentioned. In 2008, the ECHR has condemned Turkey for assassinating Musa Anter who was working for Özgur Gundem.

Yet, the number of staff members of the "free press" and volunteers to distribute dailies and weeklies termed "Kurdish free press" that were killed "on duty", particularly during the early stages of reporting on the Kurdish question in Turkey remains high. The list of names of distributors of Özgür Gündem and its successors that were killed (while the perpetrators mostly remained unknown) includes 18 names. Among the 33 journalists that were killed between 1990 and 1995 most were working for the so-called Kurdish Free Press.

Name	Publication	Place	Date	Remarks
Gündüz Etil	Yeni Günaydın	Istanbul	18 September 1991	
Halit Güngen	2000'e Doğru	Diyarbakır	18 February 1992	Killed by unidentified persons two days after reporting that eyewitnesses and sympathizers of Turkish Hezbollah had said that members of the organization were educated in the headquarters of Turkey's rapid deployment force (Çevik Kuvvet) in Diyarbakır.
Cengiz Altun	Yeni Ülke	Batman	25 February 1992	Killed by six bullets fired into his back as he was on his way to work.
İzzet Kezer	Sabah	Cizre, Şırnak Province	23 March 1992	A journalist for the mainstream daily, Sabah; shot and killed by security forces during violence that followed the celebration of the Kurdish New Year. During a state-imposed curfew, Kezer and other journalists emerged from their hotel waving white flags. No shooting was going on at the time. Kezer, at the head of the group, reached an intersection and was shot dead by security forces who fired from an armored personnel carrier. No action was taken against the security forces responsible for his death.
Bülent Ülkü	Körfeze Bakış	Bursa	1 April 1992	Found wounded near Uludağ on 1 April and died shortly afterwards. The autopsy certified marks of handcuffs and ink on his fingers. Officials claimed that he was the victims of an internal dispute between left-wing organizations, but friends denied this.
Mecit Akgün	2000e Doğru	Nusaybin, Mardin	2 June 1992	His body was found hanging from a telephone pole near the village of Colova in Nusaybin. It was claimed that a statement was found on his body saying that he was "punished because he was a traitor", this was allegedly signed by the PKK.
Hafız Akdemir	Özgür Gündem	Diyarbakır	8 June 1992	Killed by a single bullet into the back of his head, fifty meters from his home in Diyarbakir. Özgür Gündem began publication on 30 May 1992; reporters stated that they had received telephoned threats for several days, several addressed to Akdemir. He had written about the Islamic organization Hezbollah and Turkish counterguerrillas.
Çetin Ababay	Özgür Halk	Batman	29 July 1992	Shot in the head by three unidentified men while on his way home in Batman.
Yahya Orhan	Özgür Gündem	Gercüş, Batman Province	31 July 1992	Shot and killed by unknown assailants. Özgür Gündem reported that he had been stopped on the street and threatened.
Hüseyin Deniz	Özgür Gündem	Ceylanpınar, Şanlıurfa Province	9 August 1992	Critically wounded by a bullet fired into his neck. He was also the regional correspondent for the daily, Cumhuriyet.
Musa Anter	Özgür Gündem	Diyarbakır	20 September 1992	He had written for Özgür Gündem and Yeni Ulke, as well as for the Kurdish newspaper Welat. He was also the chairman of the board of the Mesopotamian Cultural Center in Istanbul. He was reportedly lured from his hotel on false pretenses and shot in the outskirts of Diyarbakir. A relative accompanying him was shot and wounded at the same time.
Mehmet Sait Erten	Azadi-Denk	Diyarbakır	3 November 1992	
Yaşar Aktay	free-lanced	Hani, Diyarbakır	9 November 1992	Killed during clashes between the PKK militants and government forces.
Hatip Kapçak	Serbest/Hürriyet	Mazıdağı, Mardin	18 November 1992	Mardin reporter for a local newspaper, Soz, and for the weekly journal, Gercek (Fact). Killed in an armed attack in the Mazidagi district of Mardin on 18 November. He had been researching and reporting on the activities of the Turkish Hezbollah organization, which allegedly has ties to security forces. He had served six years in prison on political charges following the 1980 military coup. After his release, he wrote for the mainstream daily, Gunes, and then for the daily, Hurriyet.
Namık Tarancı	Gerçek	Diyarbakır	20 November 1992	Shot and killed on his way to work. He reportedly received three bullets in his head after an attack by two assailants and died on the spot.
Kemal Kılıç	Yeni Ülke	Şanlıurfa	18 February 1993	Shot dead with two bullets in the head by four assailants. He had been writing for the newspaper Yeni Ulke since the suspension of publication of Özgür Gündem in January. He was also a member of the board of the Urfa Branch of the Turkish Human Rights Association. Mehmet Senol, the Diyarbakir representative for Özgür Gündem, reported that Kilic had applied for a gun license, but that his application had been rejected. He was shot and killed by unknown assailants in Kulunce Village, near Sanliurfa. Police had questioned him about a news release he had published on the difficulties distributors had faced in selling the newspaper in Sanliurfa Province.
Mehmet İhsan Karakuş	Silvan Gazetesi	Silvan, Diyarbakır	13 March 1993	Owner of the local newspaper Silvan. Shot by unknown assailants that were not identified until the end of 1993.
Ercan Gürel	Hürriyet News Agency	Bergama, İzmir Province	20 May 1993	Veysel Özakıncı was detained as his killer and stated that he killed him because of a dispute of the ownership of land.
Ömer Taşar	Milli Gazete	Sarajevo	26 June 1993	Killed by fire opened from Serbian positions while covering the Bosnian Civil War.
İhsan Uygur	Sabah	Istanbul	6 July 1993	
Rıza Güneşer	Halkın Gücü	Istanbul	14 July 1993	Owner of the left-wing journal "Halkın Gücü". The murder is believed to have been committed by the "Bedri Yağan group", a split of the Devrimci Sol
Ferhat Tepe	Özgür Gündem	Bitlis	28 July 1993	Disappeared when he was reportedly forced to get into a car. Although several teams of police were seen patrolling the streets at the time, they denied any knowledge of the incident. On 8 August a body found in Lake Hazar, near Elazığ, was identified as being Tepe's. On 9 May 2003 the European Court of Human Rights ruled that the material in the case file does not enable it to conclude beyond all reasonable doubt that the applicant's son was abducted and killed by any State agent or person acting on behalf of the State authorities.
Muzaffer Akkuş	Milliyet	Bingöl	20 September 1993	Killed by unknown assailants.
Ruhi Can Tul	TDN	Kırıkkale	14 January 1994	Died when a bomb exploded in a bus going from Ankara to Samsun. Three others were killed. The PKK allegedly claimed responsibility for the attack.
Nazım Babaoğlu	Gündem	Siverek, Şanlıurfa Province	12 March 1994	Presumed dead after disappearing in Siverek, a small town near Sanliurfa. He had traveled there to follow up on a news tip from a colleague, who later denied phoning him.
Kamil Koşapınar	Zaman	Erzurum	19 March 1994	According to the newspaper he worked for, he was killed by a stray bullet at a photo shop.
İsmail Ağay	Özgür Ülke	Batman	29 May 1994	Surname might be Ağaya; according to the Bar Association in Batman he is "missing" since December 1994.
Erol Akgün	Devrimci Çözüm	Gebze, Kocaeli Province	8 September 1994	Editor-in-chief of the left-wing weekly Devrimci Cozum. Killed by unidentified assailants as he left his home in Gebze, near Istanbul. His colleagues at the paper believe a rival left-wing faction killed him because he was the weekly's editor.
Bahri Işık	Çağdaş Marmara	Istanbul	17 September 1994	
Ersin Yıldız	Özgür Ülke	Istanbul	3 December 1994	Died when the offices of his paper in Istanbul were destroyed by a bomb, planted by unidentified persons, 19 staff members were wounded.
Bekir Kutmangil	Yeni Günaydın	Istanbul	23 May 1995	Owner of the local newspaper, but was reportedly involved in affairs of organized crime. A rival was made responsible for the killing.
Nail Aydın	Son Haber	Giresun	28 July 1995	
Seyfettin Tepe	Yeni Politika	Bitlis	28 August 1995	Also spelled Safyettin Tepe, was taken into custody on 22 August. Four days later he was moved to the Bitlis Security Directorate. He died in custody on 29 August. His family was told that he committed suicide but rejects that official explanation.

At the same time several people distributing pro-Kurdish newspaper in the region under a state of emergency, were also killed.

== Killings of journalists since 1995 ==
The killings of journalists in Turkey since 1995 are more or less individual cases. Most prominent among the victims is Hrant Dink, killed in 2007, but the death of Metin Göktepe also raised great concern, since police officers beat him to death. Since 2014, several Syrian journalists who were working from Turkey and reporting on the rise of Daesh have been assassinated.

The death of Metin Alataş in 2010 is also a source of disagreement – while the autopsy claimed it was suicide, his family and colleagues demanded an investigation. He had formerly received death threats and had been violently assaulted.

Name	Publication	Place	Date	Remarks
Metin Göktepe	Evrensel	Istanbul	8 January 1996	Beaten to death by police, prompting a public outcry among journalists. After several trials, retrials, and appeals, in January 2000, an appeals court upheld seven-and-a-half-year prison sentences for five police officers involved in the killing.
Yemliha Kaya	Halkın Gücü	Istanbul	27 July 1996	Owner and editor-in-chief of the journal Halkın Gücü (Power of the People). Died as the result of a hunger strike against prison conditions. She was in prison since 1995, charged with membership of the DHKP-C.
Selahattin Turgay Daloğlu		Istanbul	9 September 1996	Known as a writer of books about Fatsa (self-administration in Fatsa, see de:Selbstverwaltung in Fatsa). He was killed at his home.
Reşat Aydın	AA, TRT		20 June 1997	
Abdullah Doğan	Candan Fm	Konya	13 July 1997	
Ünal Mesuloğlu	TRT	Manisa	8 November 1997	
Mehmet Topaloğlu	Kurtuluş	Adana	28 January 1998	Adana representative of the newspaper Kurtuluş. Killed by police officers in a house raid along with Selahattin Akıncı, a vendor for the same paper and Bülent Dil, on the night of 28 January.
Önder Babat	Devrimci Hareket	Istanbul	3 March 2004	Shot in the head with a 9 mm pistol after leaving the office of his paper in Beyoğlu (Istanbul) together with three friends. It has not been found out who the attackers were, where they came from and why they shot him. The ECtHR considered that the material in the case file did not enable it to conclude beyond all reasonable doubt that Önder Babat was killed by any State agent or person acting on behalf of the State authorities. Therefore, there had been no violation of Article 2 on that account.
Yaşar Parlak	Silvan Mücadele	Silvan	18 August 2004	Started as an amateur journalist with Günaydın in 1973. After 1976 he worked for the news agency Akdeniz. His first book "History of Silvan" was released 1980. His research on unsolved killings in Silvan "Şehitler Şehri Silvan" (Town of Martyrs: Silvan) was released in 2004, but the governor banned its distribution. In April 2004 he was detained on allegations that he had kidnapped a girl (a young woman looking after his mother). He was released after one month. Two months later he was shot in his neck with one bullet.The assailants were identified.
Hrant Dink	Agos	Istanbul	19 January 2007	Managing editor of the bilingual Turkish-Armenian weekly Agos, was shot outside his newspaper's offices in Istanbul. A day later, police arrested the alleged gunman, 17-year-old Ogün Samast, who reportedly confessed to the crime. Amnesty International says that the authorities have failed to address state officials' alleged involvement in his killing. Calls by his family to investigate the collusion and negligence of state officials in the murder, backed by a European Court of Human Rights judgment in 2010, have not been heeded.
İsmail Cihan Hayırsevener	Güney Marmara Yaşam	Bandırma, Balıkesir Province	19 December 2009	12 people went on trial for his murder in Istanbul. The founder of the newspaper İlk Haber (First News), İhsan Kuruoğlu was accused of having instructed Serkan Erakkuş to kill Hayırsevener. On 1 August 2013, the court sentenced Kuruoğlu to 27 years' imprisonment.
Nuh Köklü		Istanbul	17 February 2015	While playing snowball with his friends in Kadıköy, he was stabbed to death during a brawl after the snowball hit the window of a shopkeeper's shop.
Ibrahim Abdulkader	Ayn Watan	Şanlıurfa	27 December 2015	Syrian refugees. Islamic State claimed responsibility.
Firas Hammadi	Ayn Watan	Şanlıurfa	27 December 2015	Syrian refugees. Islamic State claimed responsibility.
Naji al Jurf	Hentah	Gaziantep	27 December 2015	Syrian refugee. Nobody claimed responsibility for the assassination, which happened as his family were seeking asylum in France.
Rohat Aktaş	Azadiya Welat	Cizre, Şırnak	24 February 2016	Caught in the crossfire between the Turkish military and the PKK.
Zaher al-Shurqat	Aleppo Today	Gaziantep	12 April 2016	Syrian journalist died in hospital on April 12, 2016 after being shot in the head by a masked man on April 10 on a street in Gaziantep. He was 36 years old. Islamic State claimed responsibility for the killing.
Mustafa Cambaz	Yeni Şafak	Istanbul	15 July 2016	During the 2016 military coup attempt, the photojournalist and recording photographer died when rebel soldiers opened fire near Çengelköy Police Station.
Halla Barakat	ABC News	Istanbul	21 September 2017	Authorities arrested and secured a confession from a distant relative for the murder of Halla and her mother due to financial reasons, but her family, friends and colleagues suspect that "her work may have threatened powerful figures with the motive and means to silence them." Outside experts familiar with the case, said that the documents reveal several inconsistencies and outright contradictions in the official narrative.
Jamal Khashoggi	The Washington Post	Istanbul	2 October 2018	Murdered by Saudi agents in the Saudi Arabian consulate in Istanbul.
Güngör Arslan	Ses Kocaeli	İzmit, Kocaeli Province	19 February 2022	Publisher and news editor of the local online newspaper Ses Kocaeli. Was shot in the right leg and chest in his office. Arslan was hospitalized but could not be saved. According to the indictment, prosecutors claim that Arslan was killed because of his journalistic activities, including his columns on alleged corruption in local government activities.

== See also ==
- Human Rights in Turkey
- Censorship in Turkey
- List of assassinated people from Turkey
- List of arrested journalists in Turkey
- Attempted assassination of Pope John Paul II
- List of journalists killed in Europe
