= Şebnem Korur Fincancı =

Turkish medic and professor

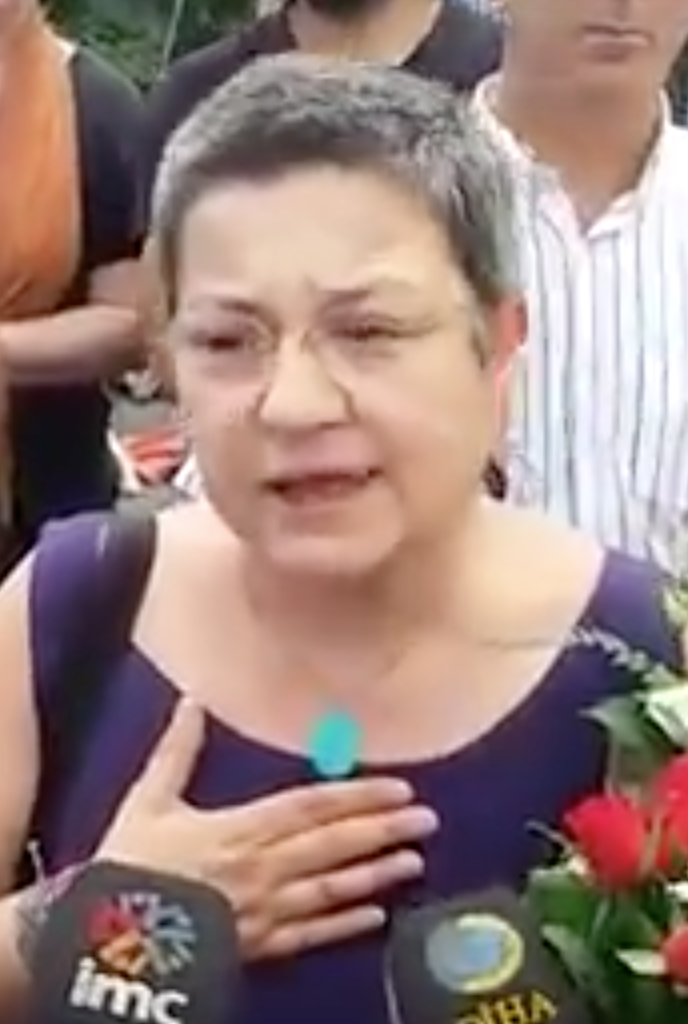
- Şebnem Korur Fincancı in 2016
- Born: 1959 (age 66–67); Istanbul, Turkey
- Occupations: Medic, professor, human rights activist
- Known for: President of the Turkish Medical Association; member of the Turkish Human Rights Association

Şebnem Korur Fincancı (born 1959) is a Turkish medic, former professor, and former president of the Turkish Medical Association (TBB). She is a member of the Turkish Human Rights Association (TİHV). In Turkish popular culture she is being called to be the "Turkish female villain".

== Early life and education ==
After having completed her high school at the Kadıköy College of Education, she graduated in medicine at the University of Istanbul she received further training in forensic medicine. Following she studied classical archaeology at the Faculty of Literature of the University of Istanbul from 1987 to 1990. She is a founding member of both the Turkish Penal Law Association and the Society of Forensic Medicine having presided the latter between 1993 and 1996. In 1997, she became the head of the forensic medical department of the University of Istanbul.

== Professional career ==
In 1996 Korur Fincancı was involved in the autopsy of several bodies unearthed from mass graves in the Kalesija region in Bosnia on behalf of the United Nations International Criminal Tribunal for the Former Yugoslavia. In 1999, she was a collaborator in the drafting of the Istanbul Protocol, which was to become guideline for the documentation of torture for the United Nations. In 2002, she contributed to a survey and handbook on sexual violence for the World Health Organization (WHO), After being convicted of terror related charges, she temporarily put her office at the university on hold. In 2016, after human rights violations were documented during the curfews ordered by the Turkish authorities in Southeast Turkey in pursue of militants of the Kurdistan Workers' Party (PKK), she became a signatory of the petition We will not be a party of this crime from the Academics for Peace. Between 2018 and 2021, she was the president of the TIHV. In October 2020, Korur-Financi was elected the president of the Turkish Medical Association (TBB). Having assumed as the TBB president, the Turkish president, Recep Tayyip Erdogan, referred to her as "someone from a terrorist organization".

=== Further activities ===
She was a civil servant when she was the head of the board of experts at the Forensic Department from the Ministry of Justice between 1995 and 1996. She was the secretary general of the Istanbul Chamber of Medicine twice, between 1996 and 1998 and again between 2002 and 2006.

== Prosecution ==
=== Özgür Gündem trial ===
On 20 June 2016 she was detained for having been an editor-on-watch for one day for the newspaper Özgür Gündem. She was investigated for terror propaganda but released after ten days, pending trial. On 17 July 2019, she was acquitted but this time the prosecution appealed the verdict and on 3 November 2020 a court ruled a retrial was to take place. In April 2022, the dismissal of Murat Bircan, the presiding judge of the court was demanded as it was reported he was a candidate for the governing Justice and Development Party (AKP) in Samsun and was also seen in a gathering with local AKP functionaries.

=== Academics for Peace trial ===
She was also investigated for having signed the petition We are not a party of this crime by the Academics for Peace in 2016. In trial, her observations during her visit of Cizre on 3 March 2016, an interview given to Evrensel in December 2015 and another interview given to Özgür Gündem in December 2018 were presented as evidence for her being involved in disseminating terrorist propaganda. In 2019 she was sentenced to 2 years and 6 months imprisonment but she appealed the verdict.

=== Interview with Erkam Tufan Aytav on YouTube ===
After Şebnem Korur Fincancı was interviewed by Erkam Tufan Aytav on his YouTube channel on 15 March 2022, the Anti-Terrorism Department filed a criminal complaint arguing Aytav is a fugitive member of the Gülen Movement. The Gülen Movement is seen as terrorist in Turkey.

=== Terror propaganda trial ===
On 20 October 2022, Korur Fincancı spoke to Medya Haber TV, a channel with close ties to the Kurdistan Workers' Party (PKK), an organisation designated a terrorist group by Turkey and allied countries. During this broadcast, Korur Fincancı claimed that the Turkish military had used "chemical gases" on the PKK and called an investigation into the event. After her interview, the Ankara Chief Public Prosecutor's Office launched an investigation against Fincancı on charges of "making propaganda for a terrorist organization" and "insulting the state institutions and organs". President Recep Tayyip Erdogan described her statements as "speaking the language of the terrorist organization", she was insulting the Turkish armed forces and Turkey.

After the investigation was started, Fincancı criticized Medya Haber TV and other media outlets of irresponsible journalism. "They make news as if I had said chemical weapons were used. I didn't say anything like that." She had been detained at her home in Istanbul on 26 October and formally charged on 27 October in Ankara. Protests arose against her detention and the World Medical Association, the TBB and the TIHV have condemned her arrest. The president of the German Medical Association, Physicians for Human Rights, Redress, the IRCT, DIGNITY and Amnesty International have demanded her release. On 27 October, the Minister of Justice Bekir Bozdag announced plans to reform the administration of the TBB and dismiss Financi as its president.

On the 11 January 2023, a court sentenced her to over 2 years and 8 months imprisonment for terror propaganda but ordered her release.

== Controversies ==
Ceyhan Mumcu, Uğur Mumcu's brother, accused Fincancı to have prevented solving the murders of Uğur Mumcu, Ahmet Taner Kışlalı, Muammer Aksoy and Bahriye Üçok by preparing a fake forensic report which indicates the suspects were tortured, while not examining or seeing them. Fincancı later attempted to intervene the Ergenekon trials since University's then-rector, Kemal Alemdaroğlu, was detained; claiming Istanbul University "prevented her fight against torture" by the order of "Ergenekon terrorist organization".

== Awards ==
- 2014: Hrant Dink Award
- 2018: Hessian Peace Prize
