= Gülçin Çaylıgil =

Turkish lawyer (1925-2013)

- Born: 7 January 1925; Istanbul, Turkey
- Died: 10 April 2013 (aged 88); Bodrum, Turkey
- Education: Istanbul University
- Occupation: Lawyer

Gülçin Çaylıgil (7 January 1925, in Istanbul – 10 April 2013, in Bodrum) was a Turkish lawyer and freedom of thought activist.

In 1950, she graduated from Istanbul University Faculty of Law. She started working as a lawyer in 1952 and ended her career in 2007 due to health issues. Throughout her 55 years of career Çaylıgil primarily dealt with cases concerning the freedom of thought, and in her first case she defended Adnan Benk following his translation of an article about communism. She later worked as a lawyer for many writers, journalists, artists and politicians, including Orhan Apaydın, İlhan Selçuk, Orhan Kemal, Bilgesu Erenus, Ahmet Altan, İpek Çalışlar, İlhami Soysal, Doğan Avcıoğlu, Çetin Altan, Erdal Atabek, Ali Sirmen, Vedat Günyol, Alp Kuran, Uğur Mumcu, Server Tanilli, Memet Fuat, Can Yücel, Neşe Düzel, Harun Karadeniz, Talat Turhan and Yalçın Küçük.

She worked on a number of famous cases, including Deniz Subayları's case, Deniz Gezmiş and his fellow's case, the Aydınlık newspaper's case, the Madanoğlu case, Communist Party of Turkey's case, Cumhuriyet newspaper's case, Turkey Workers and Peasants Party's case, DİSK's case, 1984 Intellectuals Petition case, People's Liberation Party-Front of Turkey's case, the Revolutionary Left's case and the Peace Association's case.

In 2001, together with Yaşar Kemal, she received the Orhan Apaydın Democracy and Peace Foundation Award. In 2007, together with Hrant Dink and Ragıp Zarakolu, she was given the Turkish Journalists' Association Freedom of Press Award as a result of her "contributions to studies on the protection of press freedom".

She also worked as the vice chairman of Turkish Bars Association and was also a member of the Executive Board of Istanbul Bar Association Internship Training Center.

After 3 years of living in Bodrum, Çaylıgil died of a heart attack on 10 April 2013. After a service in front of Bodrum Court House, her body was buried at the Gümbet Karaburgaz Cemetery. On 12 April 2013, her colleagues held a commemoration ceremony in her honor in front of the Istanbul Bar Association headquarters.

Following her death, Turkish poet and writer Bilgesu Erenus announced that she had been working on a biography about Çaylıgil, titled Böyle Bir Dünya: Gülçin Çaylıgil Davası.
