= List of assassinated people from Turkey =

The following is an incomplete, chronological list of people from Turkey who were assassinated, mainly on political and religious grounds. Many were critical public servants and intellectuals assassinated by far-right proponents of an army-controlled Turkish Republic. Many of the victims have historically been intellectual proponents of laicism and the strict separation of religion and state in Turkey, as defined in the constitution, and diplomats who were victims of militant attacks outside of Turkey.

== Prior to 1970 ==
- 28 January 1921: Mustafa Suphi, founder of the Communist Party of Turkey. Suphi and his 14 comrades were assassinated while they were being sent to Erzurum for trial.
- 2 April 1948: Sabahattin Ali, a writer who was assassinated at the Bulgarian border while fleeing from Turkey,having been imprisoned by the Turkish government.

== 1970s ==
- 27 January 1973: Mehmet Baydar, at the time Turkey's consul general in Los Angeles, and Bahadır Demir, his deputy, in 1973. Shot in a Santa Barbara hotel by Kourken Yanigian, who had invited them there on the pretext of a donating a painting to the Turkish government. Yanigian, sentenced to life imprisonment, was given amnesty in 1984 and died shortly afterwards. The event is considered to be the first in a decade-long chain of organized attacks against Turkish diplomats by Armenian militant groups.
- 22 October 1975: Turkey's Ambassador to Austria, Daniş Tunalıgil was murdered by three Armenian gunmen raiding the Embassy in Vienna.
- 24 October 1975: Turkey's Ambassador to France, Ismail Erez and his driver Talip Yener were murdered by Armenian militants in the vicinity of the French Embassy in Paris by car bomb.
- 9 June 1977: Turkey's Ambassador to the Holy See, Taha Carim was killed by the cross fire of two Armenian gunmen in front of the Embassy's residency in Rome.
- 11 March 1978: Bedrettin Cömert, (tr) an art historian, scholar, literary critic and translator. He was serving on a committee investigating right-wing terror squads at his university. He was shot dead in his car with his wife, who was severely wounded by Rıfat Yıldırım, Üzeyir Bayraklı and by another man nicknamed "Ahmet" who were ultra-nationalists and believed to have been directly funded by the Turkish state. A tribunal found Abdullah Çatlı responsible but nobody was sentenced as a result.
- 24 March 1978: Doğan Öz, a public prosecutor who wrote a report for Prime Minister Bülent Ecevit accusing clandestine groups (later named as Ergenekon) of creating chaos in order to lay the ground for a military takeover. Haluk Kırcı, a Grey Wolves activist, was implicated in his assassination.
- 20 October 1978: Bedri Karafakıoğlu, a former rector of Istanbul Technical University.
- 1 February 1979: Abdi İpekçi, an editor of the major national newspaper Milliyet. Killed in his car in the street where he lived, by Mehmet Ali Ağca.Ağca was a member of the ultra-nationalist Grey Wolves, who later tried to assassinate the Pope John Paul II in 1981.
- 23 March 1979: Metin Yüksel, an Islamist political and social activist He was shot to death outside of Istanbul's Fatih Mosque by nationalist gunmen while leaving Friday prayers.
- 28 September 1979: Cevat Yurdakul, a prosecutor.
- 12 October 1979: Ahmet Benler, son of the Turkish ambassador to the Netherlands, Özdemir Benler, murderered by ASALA.
- 19 November 1979: İlhan Egemen Darendelioğlu, a journalist and writer. Shot to death by unidentified left-wing militants.
- 7 December 1979: Cavit Orhan Tütengil, a professor of sociology at Istanbul University and columnist of the newspaper Cumhuriyet. He was shot dead at a city bus stop in Istanbul.

== 1980s ==
- 11 April 1980: Ümit Kaftancıoğlu, a TV producer, writer and columnist of the newspaper Cumhuriyet. He was gunned down in front of his home in Istanbul as he was about to get in his car.
- 27 May 1980: Gün Sazak, briefly customs and tobacco minister of Turkey and a right wing politician. Murdered in front of his car while putting out baggage. Radical leftist militant group Dev Sol (Revolutionary Left) claimed responsibility for the attack.
- 19 July 1980: Nihat Erim, the Prime Minister of Turkey in 1971–1972, for almost 14 months. Shot to death by two gunmen in Istanbul. The radical leftist militant group Dev Sol (Revolutionary Left) claimed responsibility for the attack.
- 22 July 1980: Kemal Türkler, socialist trade union leader and left-wing politician. He was murdered in front of his home by ultra-right militants.
- 17 December 1980: Şarık Arıyak, Turkish chief consul in Sydney. He was killed together with his bodyguard Engin Sever. The Justice Commandos of the Armenian Genocide claimed responsibility.
- 28 January 1982: Kemal Arıkan, Turkish diplomat Kemal Arıkan shot to death by two gunmen of Armenian origin in Los Angeles.
- 23 August 1982: Atilla Altıkat, Turkish military attaché in Canada. He was assassinated in his car while driving in Ottawa by the Justice Commandos Against Armenian Genocide.
- 22 October 1988: Esat Oktay Yıldıran, Military officer and former internal security chief of Diyarbakır Prison. He was shot dead in a public bus in Istanbul by a PKK militant.

== 1990s ==
- 31 January 1990: Muammer Aksoy, professor of law at Ankara University, faculty of political science; author of books on Kemalism; elected head of the Ankara Bar Association 1969, columnist of the newspaper Cumhuriyet. He was shot in the back of his head in front of his house.
- 7 March 1990: Çetin Emeç, Journalist, editor-in-chief and chief columnist of the liberal rightist daily Hürriyet. He was shot to death in front of his house. His case remains unresolved.
- 4 September 1990: Turan Dursun, former member of Islamic clergy who became a critic of Islam and advocate of atheism. He was shot to death in front of his house,with his case remaining unresolved.
- 6 October 1990: Bahriye Üçok, Female academic, pro-secular theologist, and a columnist of the newspaper Cumhuriyet. She was killed by a parcel bomb.
- 30 January 1991: Hulusi Sayın, retired lieutenant general. Shot dead in front of his house, with Dev-Sol took responsibility fro his death.
- 7 April 1991: Memduh Ünlütürk, a retired general, shot dead at his house by Dev-Sol.
- 29 July 1992: Kemal Kayacan, Admiral (retired), former commander of the Turkish Navy. He was shot dead in his house.
- 1992: Musa Anter, Kurdish writer, assassinated in Diyarbakır. European Court of Human Rights fined Turkey for this assassination, allegedly committed by JITEM illegal gendarmerie unit.
- 13 January 1993: Zübeyir Akkoç, a union member of Kurdish origin. His murder led to the European Court of Human Rights case Akkoç v. Turkey in 2000.
- 24 January 1993: Uğur Mumcu, Research journalist, columnist of the major newspaper Cumhuriyet.He was killed in front of his home in Ankara by a bomb installed in his car.
- 4 November 1993: Cem Ersever, ex-JITEM commander who had begun speaking to the press.
- 11 January 1995: Onat Kutlar, prominent art critic, writer, poet, columnist for the daily Cumhuriyet and one of the founders of the Istanbul International Film Festival, died of injuries he suffered during a bomb attack perpetrated by the PKK at a hotel in Istanbul.
- 8 January 1996: Metin Göktepe, a left wing journalist of Evrensel was beaten to death by Turkish police while covering civil unrest in the Gazi district of Istanbul. This was the first case in Turkey where the police were convicted of murder. Metin Goktepe DOC
- 9 January 1996: Özdemir Sabancı, businessman and a member of the Sabancı family in the second generation. Gunned down in his office in Sabancı Towers, Levent, Istanbul, by assassins hired by the leftist armed group DHKP-C. The general manager of ToyotaSA and a secretary was also killed. They had been given access to the building by Fehriye Erdal, a female member of DHKP-C, who was an employee at that time.
- 21 October 1999: Ahmet Taner Kışlalı, Academic, writer. politician, former Minister of Culture and columnist of the newspaper Cumhuriyet. Killed in Ankara by a bomb placed on the windshield of his car.

== 2000s ==
- 24 January 2001: Gaffar Okkan, Diyarbakır Police Chief, his driver and four policemen escorting him were shot dead in an attack after they left the Diyarbakır Police Department building. A radical Islamic group known as Kurdish Hezbollah was suspected.
- 25 August 2001: Üzeyir Garih, A prominent Turkish Jewish businessman and a founding partner of the Alarko group of companies, stabbed to death in the cemetery of the historic Istanbul quarter of Eyüp.
- 18 December 2002: Necip Hablemitoğlu, a Kemalist historian from Ankara University who was killed in an armed attack near his home in Ankara.
- 5 February 2006: Andrea Santoro (Father Andrea Santoro) was a Roman Catholic priest, murdered in the Santa Maria Church in Trabzon where he served as a member of the Catholic Church's Fidei donum missionary program.
- 17 May 2006: Mustafa Yücel Özbilgin, a Council of State member judge, was murdered during a session in the high court in Ankara.
- 19 January 2007: Hrant Dink, Armenian-Turkish journalist and editor-in-chief of the weekly Armenian and Turkish language newspaper Agos in Istanbul was shot dead in front of his newspaper's office.
- 18 April 2007. Three Christian leaders, Necati Aydın, Uğur Yüksel and Tilman Geske, were assassinated, two Turkish pastors and a German missionary.
- 16 November 2007. İhya Balak (tr), director of Milli Piyango, the Turkish National Lottery, was assassinated in his office by an ex-inspector of his directorate.
- July 2008: Ahmet Yıldız, "the victim of what sociologists say is the first gay honor killing in Turkey to surface publicly".
- 19 December 2009: Cihan Hayırsevener, founder and editor of the daily Güney Marmara’da Yaşam, was shot in a street in Bandırma, Balıkesir Province and died later that day at a hospital in Bursa. He had reported on corruption charges involving the owners of İlkhaber, another daily in the town.
- 19 December 2016: Andrei Karlov, the Russian Ambassador to Turkey, was assassinated by Mevlüt Mert Altıntaş, an off-duty Turkish police officer, at an art exhibition in Ankara, Turkey
- Sinan Ateş

== See also ==
- Attempted assassination of Pope John Paul II
- Human rights in Turkey
- List of assassinated people
- List of journalists killed in Turkey
- List of massacres in Turkey
