= Cavit Orhan Tütengil =

Turkish sociologist, writer, and columnist (1921-1979)

- Born: 1921; Sebil, Mersin Province, Ottoman Empire
- Died: December 7, 1979 (aged 57–58); Istanbul, Turkey
- Cause of death: Ballistic trauma
- Occupations: Sociologist; Writer; Columnist
- Known for: Victim of unsolved murder

Cavit Orhan Tütengil (1921 – December 7, 1979) was a Turkish sociologist, writer and columnist who was assassinated in 1979.

== Biography ==
He was born in Sebil, a village of Tarsus, in Mersin province of what was then the Ottoman Empire. Following his primary education in his hometown, he attended Haydarpaşa High School in Istanbul finishing in 1940. Tütengil studied philosophy at Istanbul University and graduated with a degree in 1944.

Between 1944 and 1953, Tütengil served as a high school teacher for philosophy in Antalya and Diyarbakır, and worked in village institutes as well.

In 1953, Cavit Orhan Tütengil started his academic career by entering the Faculty of Economics at Istanbul University as an assistant for sociology. He conducted his Ph.D. research on "Political and Economic Opinions of Montesquieu", which won him the 1957 Science Award of the Turkish Language Association. He became an associate professor in 1960, and from 1970 on, he served as professor. In 1962, the Turkish Ministry of National Education sent him to England for two years.

== Contributions ==
He was one of the most original Turkish sociologists. His basic field of interest focused on development sociology. To his opinion, Turkey is a transition country and the compass should be Atatürk's thoughts. Having an excellent command of the Turkish language, he wrote his Kemalist opinions in his column in the leftist newspaper Cumhuriyet for many years.

== Death ==
Cavit Orhan Tütengil was murdered early in the morning on December 7, 1979, on the way to university at a city bus stop in Levent, Istanbul. The four assassins gunned him down in crossfire and left a notice signed "Anti Terör Birliği" (Anti Terror Unit) at the crime scene. The assassination remains unsolved.

== Bibliography ==
- Köy Enstitüsü Üzerine Düşünceler (Opinions on Village Institutes) (1948)
- Ziya Gökalp Bibliyoğrafisi (Bibliography of Ziya Gökalp) (1949)
- Prens Sebahattin (Prince Sebahattin) (1954)
- Montesquieu'nün Siyasi ve İktisadi Fikirleri (Political and Economic Opinions of Montesquieu) (1954)
- Ziya Gökalp Üzerine Notlar (Notes on Ziya Gökalp) (1956)
- İçtimai ve İktisadi Bakımdan Türkiye'nin Kara Yolları (Highways of Turkey in Sociological and Economical Perspective) (1961)
- Köyden Şehire Göç Meselesi (Migration From Rural to Urban) (1963)
- Dr. Rıza Nur Üzerine (On Dr. Rıza Nur) (1965)
- Diyarbakır Basını ve Bölge Gazeteciliğimiz (Press in Diyarbakır and Regional Journalism) (1966)
- Azgelişmiş Ülkelerin Toplumsal Yapısı (Sociological Structure of Underdeveloped Countries) (1966)
- Köy Sorunu ve Gençlik (Rural Problem and Youth) (1967)
- Ağrı Dağındaki Horoz (The Cockerel on Mount Ararat) (1968)
- İngiltere'de Türk Gazetecilği (Turkish Journalism in England) (1969)
- Türkiye'de Köy Sorunu (Rural Problem in Turkey) (1969)
- Sosyalbilimlerde Araştırma ve Metod (Research and Methodology in Sociology) (1969)
- Azgelişmenin Sosyolojisi (Sociology of Underdevelopment) (1970)
- 100 Soruda Kırsal Türkiye'nin Yapısı (Structure of Rural Turkey in 100 Questions) (1975)
- Temeldeki Çatlak (Crack in the Foundation) (1975)
- Atatürkü Anlamak ve Tamamlamak (To Understand and Accomplish Atatürk) (1975)
- Prens Lütfullah Dosyası (Prince Lütfullah File) (together with Vedat Günyol) (1977)

== See also ==
- List of assassinated people from Turkey
- List of unsolved murders (1900–1979)
