= Tarık Solak =

Turkish Australian kickboxing promoter (1964–2020)

- Born: 1964; Ankara, Turkey
- Died: 24 October 2020 (aged 56); Ankara
- Resting place: Karşıyaka Cemetery, Ankara
- Citizenship: Turkish, Australian
- Occupation: Kickboxing promoter
- Known for: A1 World Combat Cup
- Spouse: 1 (m. 1983; div. 2005)
- Children: 1 (Arif Solak; born 1982)

Tarık Solak (English: Tarik Solak; 1964 – 24 October 2020) was a Turkish-Australian kickboxing promoter.

== Personal life ==
Solak was born in Ankara to a working class family with 5 children, hailing from Yozgat. His family emigrated to Australia when he was five and Solak grew up in the Northern Melbourne suburb of Brunswick among the Turkish community and in a crowded family. He started his martial arts training in taekwondo under Jemal Hasan and achieved the rank of 4th dan. He later pursued a career in kickboxing and became a gym manager.

After a long fight with cancer, he died in October 2020, in Australia. His funeral took place in Karşıyaka Cemetery, Ankara, on 24 October 2020. Solak was married between 1983 and 2005, and had one son, born 1983, named Arif.

== Career ==
Solak started his career as a kickboxing promoter in 1993 with an event where Turkish fighters trained by Jemal Hasan such as Tibet Hamza, Gerald Ilhan, Recep Saka, and Gürkan Özkan were featured. In the following year, Solak staged another show where Tibet Hamza vs. Gürkan Özkan bout was the main event. Major Australian sports broadcaster Fox Sports began covering Solak's promotions and by 1998, as he organised a major event at the Crown Casino and Entertainment Complex.

In 1999, Solak met K-1 founder Kazuyoshi Ishii in Japan. After becoming the CEO for K-1's Oceania region, Solak promoted the first K-1 World Grand Prix event in Melbourne in 2001. Later K-1 fighters Mike Zambidis and Mark Hunt got their opportunities at K-1 events promoted by Solak.

In 2003, Solak left K-1 and, by 2004, founded his new promotion A-1 World Combat Cup. A-1 was created with a show business concept that blended kickboxing with various spectacles. After several events in Australia, in 2005, A-1 held its first event in Istanbul and Solak bolstered his ties with the European kickboxing scene through his partnership with French co-promoter Kader Marouf. A-1 was well received by the Turkish public in following years and events promoted by Solak had serious representation in Turkish media. By 2006 and later, the show business aspect of A-1 was even furthered by Solak with the tournament A-1 Model Boxing that featured female fashion models. Turkish edition of Forbes magazine asserted in 2008 that the success of A-1 in Turkey resulted in a 'kickboxing economy' with very significant dimensions.

In 2007, Solak was featured with a supporting role, named "Arif Boz", in Turkish TV series titled "Pusat", lasted 13 episodes, directed by Osman Sınav.

== Filmography and television ==
=== TV series ===
Year	Channel	Series	Role	Notes
2007	Show TV	Pusat	Arif Boz	Supporting actor (13 episodes)
2018	Kanal D	Yüreğin Kadar	Himself	Promoter (1 episode)

=== Guest appearances ===
Year	Channel	Program	Notes
2006	TGRT	Hülya Avşar Show	Guest
2013	CNN Turk	Burada Laf Çok	Guest
2016	Akit TV	Spor Aktüel	Guest
