= Karşıyaka Cemetery =

Cemetery in Ankara, Turkey

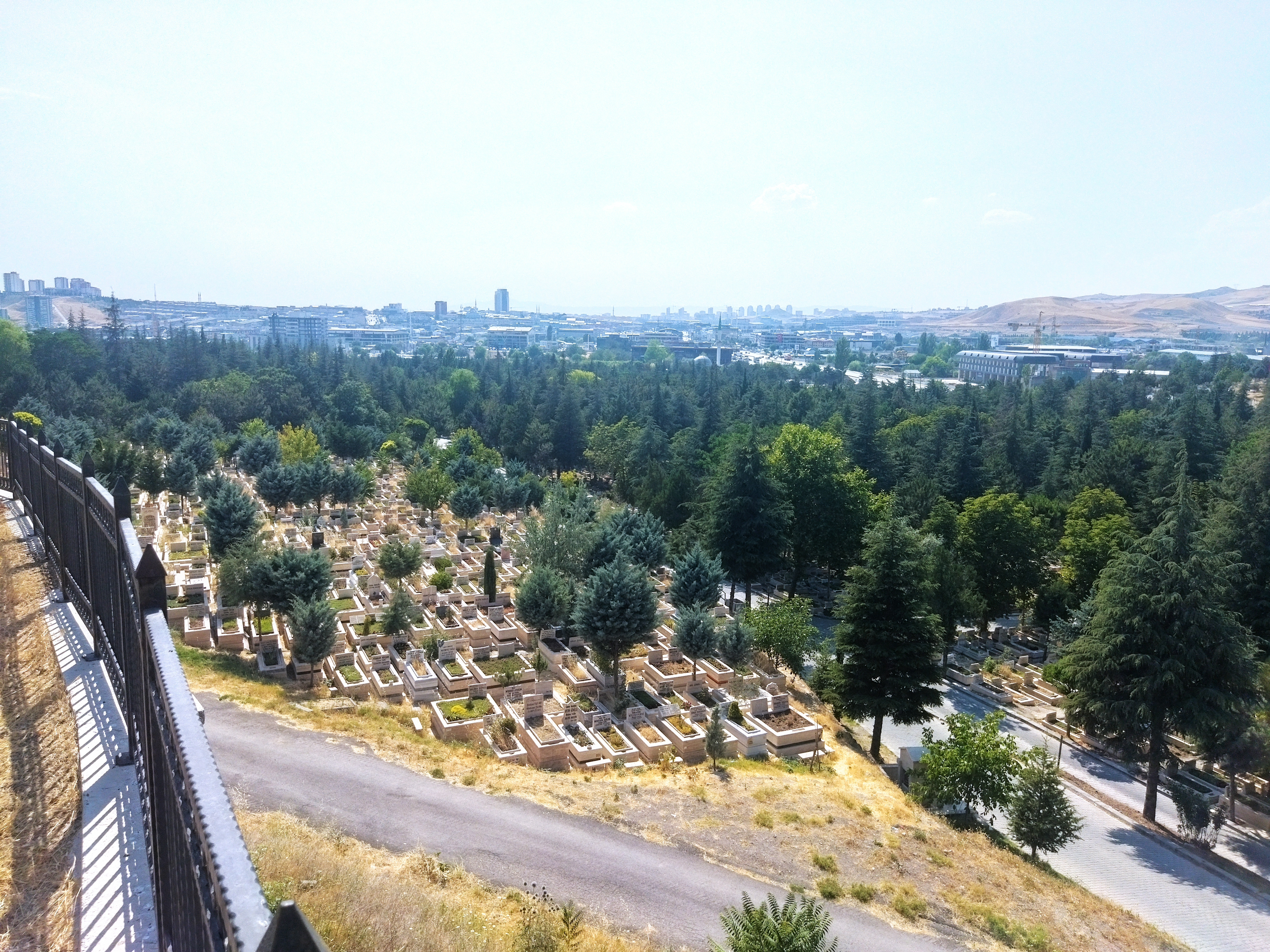
- Interactive map of Karşıyaka Cemetery

Details
- Location: Karşıyaka, Yenimahalle, Ankara Province
- Country: Turkey
- Coordinates: 39.992°N 32.777°E
- Type: Public
- Owned by: Ankara Metropolitan Municipality
- Size: 2,890 decares (2.89 km^{2}; 1.12 sq mi)
- No. of graves: 260,000 (November 30, 2009)

The Karşıyaka Cemetery (Turkish: Karşıyaka Mezarlığı) is a modern burial ground located at Karşıyaka neighborhood in Yenimahalle district of Ankara Province, Turkey. Administered by the Metropolitan Municipality, it is the biggest cemetery in Ankara. Many prominent figures from the world of politics, business, sports and arts rest here.

In the end of 1998, the size of the burial area was extended from 1,707 decares (1.707 km^{2}; 0.659 sq mi) to 2,890 decares (2.89 km^{2}; 1.12 sq mi) to meet the need for the city's burial ground until 2025. In the end of November 2009, it was reported by the director of city cemeteries that there are 260,000 graves in the Karşıyaka Cemetery, and the number of interments at the cemetery is about one thousand per month with increasing tendency. He added that "Due to increased rate of burials, it was expected that the cemetery will reach its capacity already in 2010. For this reason a much larger cemetery is projected." Karşıyaka Cemetery is the biggest cemetery in Ankara. The average number of visitors is two thousand daily.

== Notable burials ==
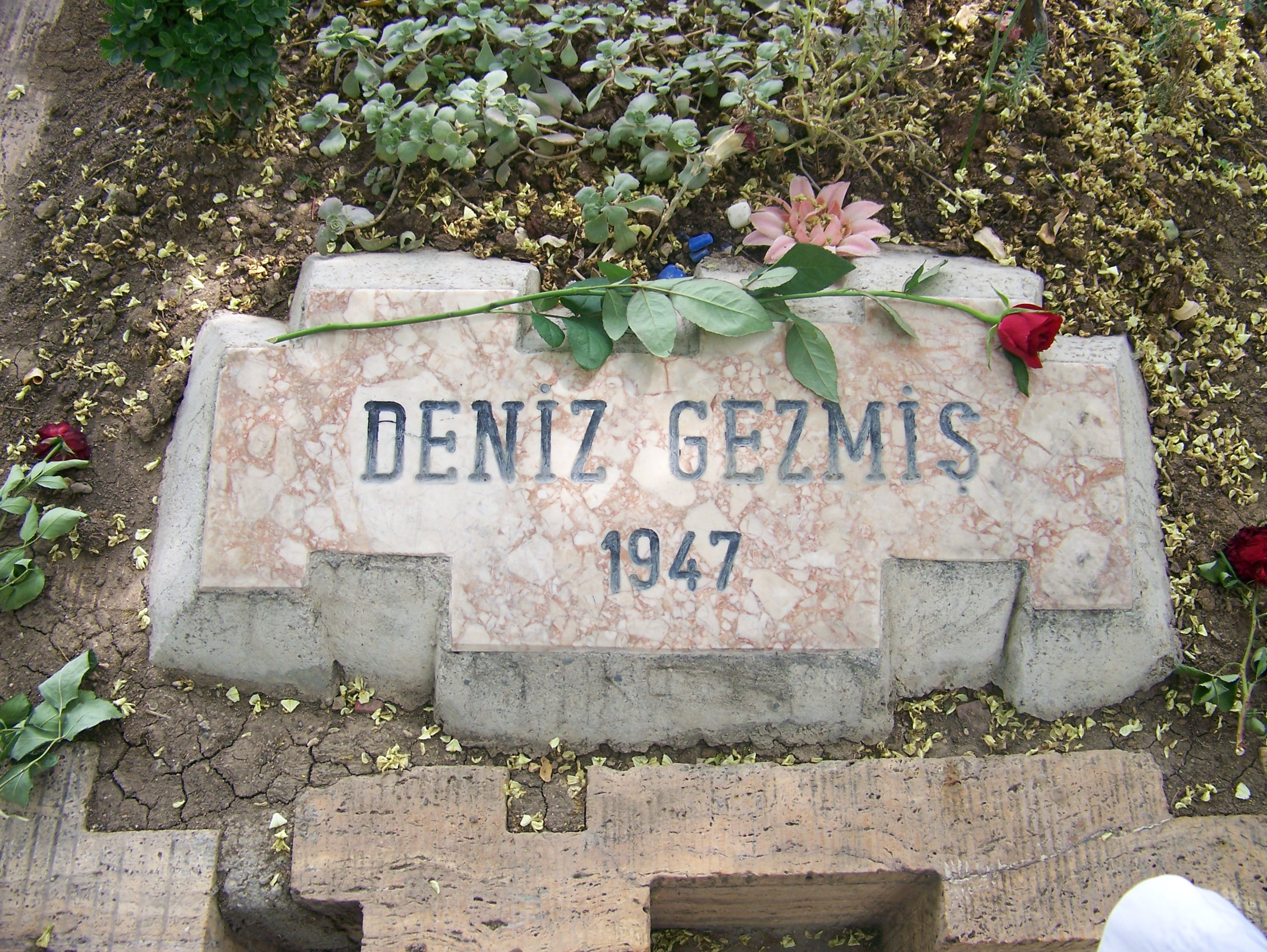
Gezmiş's grave in Karşıyaka Cemetery, Ankara

- Türkân Akyol (1928–2017), female academic, politician and government minister
- Mehmet Altınsoy (1924–2007), politician, co-founder of Motherland Party (ANAP), Mayor of Ankara and Minister of State.
- Fikri Elma (1934–1999), footballer and top scorer
- Ulvi Cemal Erkin (1906–1972), pioneering symphonic composers in Turkey
- Deniz Gezmiş (1947–1972), executed Marxist–Leninist revolutionary and political activist
- Jülide Gülizar (1929–2011), anchorwoman and journalist
- İsmet Hürmüzlü (1938–2013), Iraqi Turkmen actor, screenwriter and director
- Masatoshi Gündüz Ikeda (1926–2003), Turkish mathematician of Japanese ancestry
- Cezmi Kartay (1920–2008), civil servant and politician
- Tarık Solak (1964–2020), Turkish-Australian kickboxing promoter
- Ahmet Taner Kışlalı (1939–1999), assassinated intellectual, political scientist, lawyer, columnist, academic and politician
- Ferit Tüzün (1929–1977), composer
- Bahriye Üçok (1919–1990), assassinated female academic of theology, left-wing politician, columnist and women's rights activist
- Erdal Eren (1961-1980) was left-wing militant executed by hanging in the aftermath of the Military coup in September 1980 in Turkey

== See also ==
- List of cemeteries in Turkey
