= Refik Erduran =

Turkish playwright, columnist and writer

- Born: Ahmet Refik; February 13, 1928; Istanbul, Turkey
- Died: January 7, 2017 (aged 88); Edirne, Turkey
- Resting place: Zincirlikuyu Cemetery, Istanbul
- Education: Robert College; Cornell University
- Occupations: Playwright, columnist, writer
- Spouses: Melda Kalyoncu (1950–1955); Leyla Umar (1958–1960); Sevim Tülay Güngör (1992–1997); Pınar Duygu (1997–2003)
- Children: 4
- Writing career
- Years active: 1954–2012
- Genres: Comedy, vaudeville

Ahmet Refik Erduran (February 13, 1928 – January 7, 2017) was a Turkish playwright, columnist and writer. He wrote thirty plays and eight books, and was a columnist for twenty years; he was named "The Most Successful Playwright" by the Turkish Ministry of Culture and "The Most Successful Columnist" by the Turkish Journalists' Association. He was married four times and had four children. Erduran served as a military interpreter during the Korean War.

== Personal life ==
Ahmet Refik Erduran was born to Hüsamettin Erduran and his wife Refika in Salacak in the Üsküdar district of Istanbul, Turkey on February 13, 1928. He had an elder sister named Leyla, who was four years older. He grew up with a French Catholic nanny, who spoke only French; thus he learned French from a very early age.

In 1938, he entered Robert College in Istanbul. After graduating from the high school, he went to the United States in 1947, where he was educated in the history of theatre at Cornell University. Returning home, Erduran entered compulsory military service as a reserve officer, and was sent to the Turkish Brigade during the Korean War (1950–1953) to serve as an interpreter.

He married four times. In 1950, he first married poet Nâzım Hikmet's stepsister Melda Kalyoncu, who gave birth to their son Murat in 1953. This marriage lasted five years. He married journalist Leyla Umar in 1958. The couple divorced two years later, but remained together until 1977. In 1992, Erduran married Sevim Tülay Güngör. which also lasted for five years. In 1997 Erduran married Pınar Duygu (born 1965), the daughter of his third wife from her earlier marriage. They had a son in 1997 and twins in 2002. The marriage was annulled in February 2003 by a court decision for being immoral after a claim was filed by a lawyer.

In June 1951, Erduran helped Nâzım Hikmet (1902–1963), whom he greatly admired, to flee Turkey for Moscow, via Romania by boat on the Black Sea.

Erduran died at the age of 88 in a hospital at Edirne on January 7, 2017. His body was transferred to Istanbul, and interred at Zincirlikuyu Cemetery two days later.

== Writing career ==
Erduran professionally wrote his first play Deli (literally: The Mad) in 1957. Until 2012, he wrote thirty plays, mostly in the genre of comedy and vaudeville, which were staged with success in various theaters in Turkey. His plays Bir Kilo Namus (One Kilo Honesty) in 1958 and Cengiz Han’ın Bisikleti in 1959 (The Bicycle of Genghis Khan) brought him fame. After an invitation of Abdi İpekçi, he began a career as a columnist in 1965, which continued until 1985 in various newspapers like Milliyet, Güneş, Meydan and Sabah. He published eight books. In 1971 he was one of the contributors of Ortam, a weekly political magazine based in Istanbul.

In 1995, he went to Bosnia and joined the special forces Black Swans in order to show his symbolic opposition to the Serbian attacks. He published the events he eyewitnessed in serials at the daily Milliyet. The serials were later collected into a book titled Bosnalı Samuraylar (The Samurais of Bosnia).

== Recognitions and awards ==
In 1986, he became president of the International Theatre Institute's (ITI) Turkey branch. He was elected chair of the "Authors Committee" of the same organization's World Congress held at Helsinki, Finland in 1989. Upon an invitation of the Iowa Writers' Workshop, he went to the United States, where he worked nearly one year. He stayed in California some seven or eight years to adapt some of his works into television. During this period, he continued his journalist career serving as the chief of the Western America News Office of Milliyet. In 1985, he was named "The Most Successful Columnist" by the Turkish Journalists' Association, and in 1991 "The Most Successful Playwright" by the Ministry of Culture. His play Ramiz ile Jülide (Ramiz and Jülide) brought him the "Yunus Emre Contest Award" in 1995.
