= Emre Kongar =

- Born: 13 October 1941 (age 84); Istanbul, Turkey
- Education: Şişli Terakki High School
- Alma mater: Ankara University (BA 1963); Michigan University (MSW 1966); Hacettepe University (PhD 1969)
- Occupations: Author, academic, social scientist
- Writing career
- Years active: 1966–present
- Subject: Social science
- Website: www.kongar.org

Reşit Emre Kongar (born 13 October 1941) is a Turkish social scientist, academic, author, and columnist. As of July 2021, he regularly writes his column at Cumhuriyet.

== Early life and education ==
Emre Kongar was born in 1941 in Istanbul, to İhsan Kongar, a philosophy teacher at Şişli Terakki High School and Pertevniyal High School and Mesude Kongar, also a philosophy teacher at Şişli Terakki High School and Zapyon High School. Engin, his older brother, died with Yalçın M., a mountain climbing fellow, following a fatal accident that happened in Demirkazık Peak, located in Toros Mountains on 8 September 1956.

He received his bachelor's degree of public finance at Faculty of Political Science, Ankara University of Ankara University in 1963 and later studied Master of Social Work at Michigan State University until 1966.

== Career ==
In 1968, Kongar founded Social Studies Academy at Hacettepe University, Ankara.

In 1983, Kongar was one of the earliest academics to protest Council of Higher Education of Turkey, the post-coup d'état formed high level education supervision board, based on his claim that İhsan Doğramacı to found and lead this board, who was also the founder of Bilkent University, a private university, would disrupt public property function of the state owned universities.

Between 1996 and 2000, until his retirement of academic profession, he lectured at Hacettepe, Yıldız Teknik and Istanbul Universities.

Kongar supported the March for Justice led by Republican People's Party and walked along Kemal Kılıçdaroğlu on 21 June 2017.

His book "İstanbul: 1940’lardan Bugüne Efsaneler Anılar İzlenimler" was published by Remzi Kitapevi in 2019.

== Bibliography ==
=== Books ===
Year	Original Title	Publishing House
1972	İnsanı Yönlendirme ve Sosyal Hizmetler	Türk Sosyal Bilimler Derneği Yayınları
1982	Cavit Orhan Tütengil	Türk Dil Kurumu Yayınları
1984	Üniversite Üzerine	Hil Yayınevi
1986	Kültür ve İletişim	Say Yayınevi
1987	Demokrasi İşçinin Ekmeğidir	Türk Harb-İş Yayınları
1990	İstanbul Halkının Günlük Yaşam Biçimi ve Tüketim Davranışları	Istanbul Chamber of Commerce
1991	İstanbul Tüketicisinin Perakende Alışveriş Alışkanlıklar	Istanbul Chamber of Commerce
1992	Yirmibirinci Yüzyılda Dünya, Türkiye ve Kamuoyu	Simavi Yayınları
1999	İstanbul Halkının Yaşam Biçimi ve Sorunları	Istanbul Chamber of Commerce
1999	Yamyamlara Oy Yok!	Remzi Kitapevi
2002	Demokrasi ve Vampirler	Remzi Kitapevi
2003	Yozlaşan Medya ve Yozlaşan Türkçe	Remzi Kitapevi
2006	Konsantremi Bozma!	Remzi Kitapevi
2006	Trajikomik	Remzi Kitapevi
2008	Demokrasimizle Yüzleşmek	Remzi Kitapevi
2009	Herkesten Bir Şey Öğrendim	İş Bankası Yayınları
2011	Ben Müsteşarken	Remzi Kitapevi
2012	12 Eylül Kültürü	Remzi Kitapevi
2013	Türkiye'yi Sarsan Otuz Gün, Gezi Direnişi	Cumhuriyet Yayınları
2016	Yazarlar, Eleştiriler, Anılar	Remzi Kitapevi
2016	21. Yüzyılda Türkiye	Remzi Kitapevi
2016	28 Şubat ve Demokrasi	Remzi Kitapevi
2017	Demokrasi ve Laiklik	Remzi Kitapevi
2017	Demokrasi için Manifesto, Diren!	Kırmızı Kedi Yayınevi
2017	Kızlarıma Mektuplar	Remzi Kitapevi
2017	Babam, Oğlum, Torunum	Remzi Kitapevi
2017	Devrim Tarihi ve Toplumbilim Açısından Atatürk	Remzi Kitapevi
2017	Tarihimizle Yüzleşmek	Remzi Kitapevi
2017	Toplumsal Değişme Kuramları ve Türkiye Gerçeği	Remzi Kitapevi
2018	İçimizdeki Zalim	Remzi Kitapevi
2019	İstanbul: 1940’lardan Bugüne Efsaneler Anılar İzlenimler”	Remzi Kitapevi

=== Publications ===
Year	Original Title	Publishing House
1972	İzmir'de Kentsel Aile (Note: PhD Thesis.)	Türk Sosyal Bilimler Derneği Yayınları
1981	Atatürk ve Devrim Kuramlar	
