= İsmet Hürmüzlü =

- Born: 1938; Kerkuk, Iraq
- Died: 19 January 2013 (aged 74–75); Ankara, Turkey
- Occupations: Actor, screenwriter, director
- Known for: Rojhat Ağa on "Tek Türkiye"

İsmet Hürmüzlü (1938 – 19 January 2013) was an Iraqi Turkmen actor, screenwriter and director. He lived most of his life in Turkey.

İsmet Hürmüzlü was born in Kerkuk, Iraq. In the 1950s, he joined the Kerkuk Turkmen Theatre as co-founder. Later he came to Turkey and admitted to Ankara State Conservatory in 1961. After graduating from the Conservatory, he started to work in State Theatres of Turkey. In the 1970s, Hürmüzlü founded the Çağlar Art Theatre and tried experimental theatre forms. He was assigned as deputy director-general of State Theatres in the 1980s.

Hürmüzlü was awarded with the Order of Respect by Almaty Uygur State Theatre, Kazakhstan. He received the "Honor Award" from the Sweden House of Culture.

He died in Ankara, Turkey on 19 January 2013 and was buried at the Karşıyaka Cemetery.
