= Akkoç v. Turkey =

Akkoç v. Turkey 2000, Nos. 22947 & 8/93, ECHR 2000-X, was a decision by the European Court of Human Rights (ECHR) on the extent of the right to life.

The case involved the Kurd Zübeyir Akkoç in Turkey who belonged to an outlawed trade union. Both the union member and his wife received death threats, and eventually the man was killed. His widow thus took the case to court, charging that the Turkish government was responsible. The government was not found guilty of murder. However, on the right to life, the ECHR found that the Turkish government knew about the death threats and failed to protect the victim. Thus, the right to life had been violated. In addition, the state's investigation of the murder was found to be so negligent as to also be an infringement of the right to life.

With respect to international human rights law, it is noted that a government's responsibility regarding the right to life is not "passive." There should be laws against murder. Akkoç is a case that examined the "potential grey area" of the "extent to which a State can protect an individual against criminal behaviour."

== See also ==
- Human rights in Turkey
- List of assassinated people from Turkey
