= Muammer Aksoy =

Turkish lawyer, politician, columnist and intellectual (1917–1990)

- Born: 1917; İbradı, Konya vilayet, Ottoman Empire
- Died: January 31, 1990 (aged 73); Bahçelievler, Ankara, Turkey
- Education: Istanbul University, University of Zurich
- Occupations: Academic of law, politician, columnist

Muammer Aksoy (1917 – January 31, 1990) was a Turkish lawyer, politician, columnist and intellectual who was assassinated.

== Biography ==
Aksoy was born 1917 in İbradı, Konya vilayet (now Antalya Province) to the member of the Ottoman parliament Numan Aksoy. After his graduation from the Law School at Istanbul University in 1939, he earned 1950 his Doctor of Law degree in the Faculty of Law and State Sciences at the University of Zurich. Returned to Turkey, he worked as an assistant in commercial law at Istanbul University and then as an associate professor in civil law at Ankara University.

Muammer Aksoy quit his post in 1957 because he felt that the newly enacted university law would limit the academic liberty at the university, and entered his political life by joining the Republican People's Party (CHP). After the military coup in 1960, he returned to Ankara University to lecture constitutional law. He collaborated on the preparation the Constitution of 1961. In the mid-1960s he was a member of the CHP's Assembly and was part of the left of center group. He began to work as the editor-in-chief of a weekly political magazine, Ortam, just after the military coup on 12 March 1971. He was arrested in the mid-1971 by the military authorities while serving in the post.

Aksoy was elected in 1977 deputy of Istanbul from CHP. He also served as the Turkish delegate to the European Council. After the military coup in 1980, Muammer Aksoy was elected President of the Bar association of Ankara. He was also president of the Turkish Law Institution for 15 years. In 1989, he co-founded with some other intellectuals the Kemalist Thought Association, and served as the founding chairman. Aksoy also wrote column for the leftist newspaper Cumhuriyet.

Since 1950, he was an energetic defender of Atatürk's reforms, democracy and laicism. He campaigned for the nationalization of the strategic natural resources as petroleum, coal and borax.

== Death ==
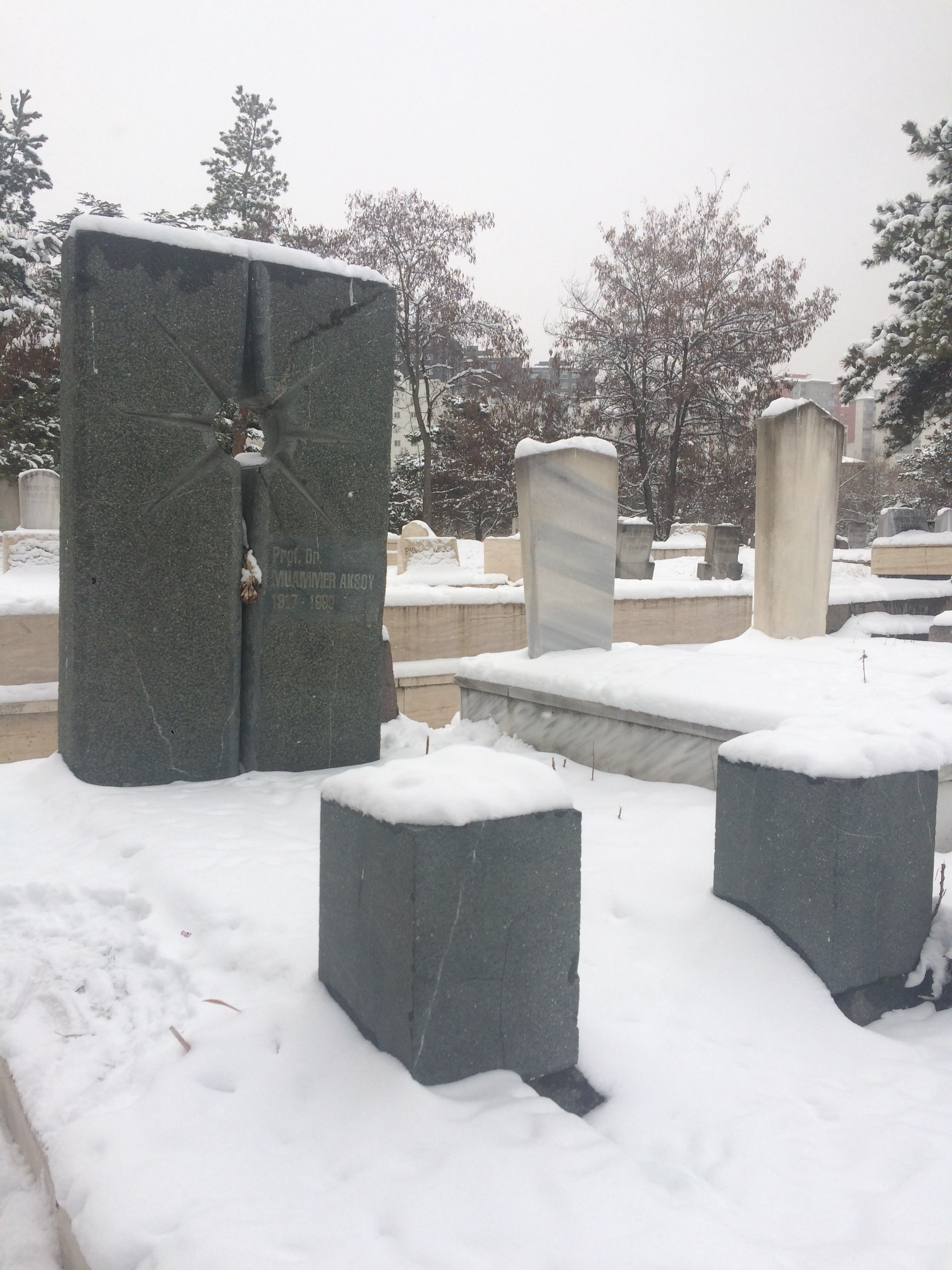
Grave of Muammer Aksoy at Cebeci Asri Cemetery.

Muammer Aksoy was murdered in the evening of January 31, 1990 in front of his home in the Bahçelievler neighborhood of Ankara. The assassination was owned by then unknown militant organizations "İslami Hareket" (Islamic Movement) and "İslami İntikam" (Islamic Revenge). The renowned investigative journalist Uğur Mumcu, a student of his, who bore his photo in front of the funeral procession, was also assassinated three years later. His colleague and co-founder of the Kemalist Thoughts Association, Bahriye Üçok shared the same, fatal fate eight months later.

Muammer Aksoy is survived by his wife and two children.

== Bibliography ==
- Devrimci Öğretmen Kıyımı (Persecution of Revolutianary Teachers) (1975) 2 volumes, Gündoğan Publishing, Ankara
- Sosyalist Enternasyonal ve CHP (Socialist International and CHP) (1977) 216p, Tekin Publishing
- Önümüzdeki Cumhurbaşkanlığı Seçimi / Rejim Bunalımına ve Kötü Sonuçlarına Doğru Pupa Yelken Gidiş (Upcoming Presidency Election / Race to Regime Crisis and Its Bad Outcome) (1989) 131p, Tekin Publishing, ISBN 975-478-039-0
- Laikliğe Çağrı (Call to Laicism) (1989) 70p, Gündoğan Publishing, Ankara ISBN 975-520-011-8
- Atatürk ve Tam Bağımsızlık (Atatürk and Full Independence) (1990) 118p, Gündoğan Publishing, Ankara ISBN 975-520-012-6
- Atatürk ve Sosyal Demokrasi (Atatürk and Social Democracy), Gündoğan Publishing, Ankara ISBN 975-520-013-4
