= Ortam =

Turkish political magazine (1971)

- Editor-in-chief: Mümtaz Soysal; Muammer Aksoy
- Categories: Political magazine
- Frequency: Weekly
- Founder: Kemal Bisalman
- Founded: 1971
- First issue: April 1971
- Final issue: 29 November 1971
- Country: Turkey
- Based in: Istanbul
- Language: Turkish
- OCLC: 175311501

Ortam (Turkish: Setting) was a weekly political magazine in Istanbul, Turkey, between April and November 1971. Founded immediately after the military coup on 12 March 1971 the magazine was one of the oppositional publications in the country. The editors and contributors of the magazine included many significant Turkish journalists, including Mümtaz Soysal, Muammer Aksoy and Uğur Mumcu among others.

== History and profile ==
Ortam was established by Kemal Bisalman and first published in April 1971. The headquarters of the magazine was in Cağaloğlu, Istanbul. The magazine was published by Vatan Publishing company on a weekly basis on Saturdays. The founding editor-in-chief was Mümtaz Soysal. He was arrested by the military authorities after the publication of the second issue, and Ortam did not appear until June 1971 when it was published under the editorship of Muammer Aksoy. He was also arrested following the tenth issue of Ortam. After this the post of editor-in-chief was not mentioned in the masthead of the magazine.

Three influential Turkish journalists, namely Uğur Mumcu, Aydın Engin and Osman Ulagay, started their journalistic career in Ortam. Uğur Mumcu served as the bureau chief of the magazine in Ankara. İlhami Soysal, Nimet Arzık, Refik Erduran, Hıfzı Veldet Velidedeoğlu and Ali Sirmen were other contributors of the magazine.

In November 1971 from the nineteenth issue the magazine was renamed Yeni Ortam (Turkish: New Setting) and produced four issues under this title before ceasing publication on 29 November 1971. During its lifetime the magazine sold nearly 35,000 copies. The founder, Kemal Bisalman, launched a daily newspaper with the same name which was first published on 11 September 1972.
