= Rohat Aktaş =

Turkish-Kurdish journalist (1997–2016)

- Born: ca. 1997; Istanbul, Turkey
- Died: February 24, 2016 (aged 18-19); Cizre, Şırnak Province, Turkey
- Cause of death: Gunshot wound to the arm
- Body discovered: February 24, 2016
- Occupations: Journalist & news editor
- Employer: Azadiya Welat

Rohat Aktaş (ca. 1997 – February 24, 2016) a Turkish-Kurdish journalist and news editor for Azadiya Welat in the southeastern Turkish town Cizre, Şırnak Province, Turkey, was shot on January 22, disappeared on January 30, 2016, and discovered later dead. At the time, he was reporting about the armed confrontation between Kurdish separatists and Turkish forces, which is part of the Kurdish–Turkish conflict (1978–present).

== Personal ==
Rohat's mother spoke with JINHA and gave an insight to Rohat's life and character. Rohat was born in Istanbul in 1997. When Rohat was three years old, the 1999 İzmit earthquake destroyed his home forcing his family to move back to their hometown, Suruç. In 2006, the Azadiya Welat began daily publication, and Rohat met with Kurdish free press and began to distribute their papers. Years later he became chief and editor for the newspaper. His mother told interviewers that he did not like cruelty or oppression of different groups, it did not seem moral and scared him.

== Career ==
Aktaş was working as a news editor for the Azadiya Welat in the southeastern Turkish town, Cizre. Aktaş was covering the protests, riots and military conflict in Cizre, it was one of the several areas where security forces were very heavily present. There were many groups of militants fighting for the banned Kurdistan Workers' Party or formerly known as PKK and this was causing the area to be extremely tense. Kurdish groups were claiming that many people had been burned in the same basement in Cizre. There was a 24-hour curfew installed for the town because of the danger that was present.

== Death ==
Rohat Aktaş was killed in Cizre, Turkey, which is displayed here relative to the capital city of Ankara and largest city Istanbul.

After Rohat Aktaş took refuge in a basement but eventually became trapped with many others. He was able to make contact with his family two days after he had sustained the injury and told them about this situation. The Azadiya Welat newsroom was in contact with Aktas but lost communication with him. On February 4, the newsroom had been without communication from Rohat Aktas for five days. They reported the last conversation they had with Rohat he told them "The state wants to execute us"

It was not until February 24 that Aktas's body had been identified using DNA testing to confirm his death. Aktas was among 8 others who were killed in the incident and found in the basement as well, 10-15 others were also wounded. Police have confirmed that more than 40 others have also died in the streets as a result of the violence.

After the shooting occurred, some changes started showing up on Rohat Aktaş's Twitter account. His profile picture showed him sitting down with a rifle over his shoulder and chest. Aktaş's agency reported that he was not a fighter and was on an assignment to cover the fights in Cizre. Other allegations of Aktas being a fighter have surfaced, but none have been proven to be true. The newspaper Rohat was working for, "Azadiya Wela" has confirmed that he was in Cizre to cover the clashes for a story. Since his death, Rohat Aktaş's Twitter account has been suspended.

== Context ==
This was part of the Kurdish–Turkish conflict (1978–present). Kurdish nationalism aspires to separate from Turkey and create an independent area known as Kurdistan and is connected in purpose with other movements in bordering countries. In Cizre, these protests and riots became violent.

== Impact ==
The violent outbreaks and treatment of citizens have sparked investigations revolving around the Human Rights in Turkey. At the time of his wound, Rohat Aktas was reporting about the confrontation between Kurdish separatists and Turkish forces in Cizre. Another unnamed journalist was also injured in the same events that led to Aktas's death.

Along with Aktas, 115 dead bodies have been removed from basements in the town of Cizre that came under attack by Turkish state forces. The government says more than 300 members of the security forces have died fighting Kurdish rebels since July. The curfew was not lifted on the town of Cizre for a few weeks after the situation arose because of leftover explosives the military was still working to clear and clean up. Locals of Cizre have spoke since the incident and said that the worst of the violence is over, but they are uncertain whether peace has been achieved yet.

== Reactions ==
Irina Bokova, director-general of UNESCO, said, "I condemn the killing of Rohat Aktaş. It is essential for freedom of expression and freedom of information that journalists be able to carry out their work without fear of death or violence."

A statement from PEN International stated: "Rohat Aktaş died while trying to tell the world about the plight of wounded civilians with little or no access to medical care in Cizre. Freedom of expression plays an invaluable role, particularly in times of conflict, to allow us to understand what is happening. We call on the Turkish authorities to conduct a swift, transparent and thorough investigation into the death of Rohat Aktaş and urge the government in Ankara to look for a peaceful and diplomatic solution to the conflict in southeast Turkey."

Press Emblem Campaign was very worried about the deterioration of the freedom of the press in Turkey. Turkey was called upon to reverse its decision to seize the Zaman daily. A full and swift investigation was needed into the murder of Rohat Aktas, the editor and journalist of a Kurdish-language daily. The event of Aktas's death has called into question the Human Rights in Turkey.

International Association of Democratic Lawyers have coordinated with Centre Europe question the Human Rights council concerning the conditions of human rights in Turkey. Journalist have been detained on false charges of terrorism, peaceful protests were the police responded with tear gas, and the wounded were denied medical treatment. Human rights are constantly ignored and disrespected in Turkey and political groups are starting to take action.

== See also ==
- List of journalists killed in Turkey
