= Cumhuriyet =

Turkish newspaper

- Type: Up-market daily
- Format: Berliner
- Owner: Cumhuriyet Foundation
- Founder: Yunus Nadi Abalıoğlu
- Editor-in-chief: Mine Esen
- Founded: May 7, 1924; 102 years ago
- Political alignment: Kemalism; Secularism/Laicism; Left-wing politics Social democracy
- Language: Turkish
- Headquarters: Şişli, Istanbul, Turkey
- Circulation: 43,791 (as of May 2018)
- Website: cumhuriyet.com.tr

Cumhuriyet (Turkish pronunciation: [dʒumhuːɾiˈjet]; English: "Republic") is the oldest up-market Turkish daily newspaper. It has been described as "the most important independent public interest newspaper in contemporary Turkey". The newspaper was awarded the Freedom of Press Prize by Reporters Without Borders in 2015 and the Alternative Nobel Prize in 2016. It is considered Turkey's newspaper of record.

Established on 7 May 1924 by journalist Yunus Nadi Abalıoğlu, a confidant of the Turkish Republic's founder Mustafa Kemal Atatürk, the newspaper has subscribed to a staunchly secular, republican course. In the past closely affiliated with the Kemalist Republican People's Party (CHP), the newspaper turned to a more independent course over time, advocating democracy, social liberal values and free markets. Today, "being a Cumhuriyet reader has become synonymous with embracing democratic values and a pluralistic society".

The newspaper's anti-government advertisements before the 2007 Turkish presidential election and general election caused controversy for "warning" voters against the AKP government with the message "Are you aware of the danger?". Notably, the newspaper has also broken the story on the 2014 National Intelligence Organisation scandal in Turkey, reprinted cartoons from Charlie Hebdo, and reported on the Panama Papers and Paradise Papers affairs while linking prominent Turkish figures to the documents.

Cumhuriyet has been targeted throughout its history, such as with the assassinations of the contributing writers Uğur Mumcu, Bahriye Üçok, Ahmet Taner Kışlalı, Muammer Aksoy, Ümit Kaftancıoğlu, Onat Kutlar, and Cavit Orhan Tütengil. More recent attacks include the 2008 molotov attack on the newspaper's headquarters in Istanbul's Şişli district and the attempted assassination of Can Dündar in 2016. The newspaper has been described as "a high-profile target in the Erdoğan government’s crackdown on media". By the end of 2016, almost half of the paper's reporters, columnists and executives had been jailed.

Cumhuriyet has been publishing satirical content. In one example, longtime cartoonist Musa Kart depicted then-Prime Minister Recep Tayyip Erdoğan as a cat entangled in a ball of yarn. Kart was subsequently prosecuted and faced a potential prison sentence of up to four years over the cartoon.

== History ==
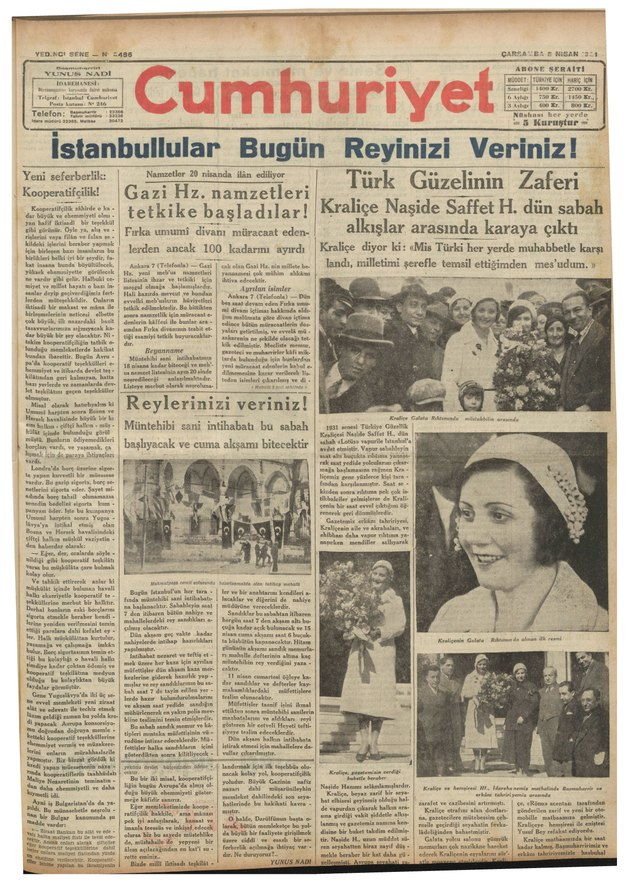
First page of the newspaper dated 8 April 1931

The founding editor-in-chief of Cumhuriyet was Zekeriya Sertel, a Turkish journalist. Following the death of Yunus Nadi on 28 March 1945 in Geneva, Switzerland, Cumhuriyet was owned by his eldest son Nadir Nadi Abalıoğlu until his death on 20 August 1991. Nadir Nadi's wife Berin then published the newspaper. Cumhuriyet has been owned by the Cumhuriyet Foundation since the death of Berin Nadi on 5 November 2001. One of its publishers was the renowned political columnist İlhan Selçuk, who was also chairman of the board of trustees and lead writer (from 1992) until his death in 2010.

Cumhuriyet contributors such as Uğur Mumcu, Bahriye Üçok, Ahmet Taner Kışlalı, Muammer Aksoy, Ümit Kaftancıoğlu, Onat Kutlar, and Cavit Orhan Tütengil were assassinated between the 1970s and 1990s.

During the Gulf War, Cumhuriyet suffered a collapse in advertising revenue, and following an unrelated dispute over editorial policy, nearly 40 journalists and commentators walked out in November 1991: "Circulation fell by half, and it was saved only by an extraordinary campaign by readers to buy extra copies and even pay money into a special account." Hasan Cemal, chief editor since 1981, resigned in January 1992 over the dispute: "I tried to widen the spectrum, to keep the balance. But they (old-guard intellectuals) always resisted, calling us plotters, tools of big business and the United States".

Since 17 October 2005, the newspaper's headquarters have been located in Istanbul's Şişli district, after being the last newspaper to leave the traditional press district of Cağaloğlu. The newspaper also has offices in Ankara and İzmir.

The newspaper's before the 2007 Turkish presidential election and general election with the message "Are you aware of the danger?" were controversial.

Cumhuriyet's office in Istanbul was the site of a molotov attack in 2008.

In 2010, the newspaper was one of the first up-market newspapers in Turkey to abandon the established broadsheet format for the midi-sized Berliner format.

In January 2015, the newspaper reprinted cartoons from Charlie Hebdo, a French satirical magazine which had depicted the Islamic prophet Muhammad and been subject to a terror attack. As a result, Cumhuriyet received threats and was placed under police protection. In 2015, it was awarded the Freedom of Press Prize by international NGO Reporters Without Borders for making a stand against the AKP government's mounting pressure.

On 22 September 2016 the newspaper was awarded the Right Livelihood Award for its "fearless investigative reporting and standing up for freedom of speech and opinion despite being subject to death threats, censorship and state prosecution". In 2016 the newspaper reported on the Panama Papers and in 2017 on the Paradise Papers, linking a number of prominent Turkish figures to those documents.

The editor-in-chief of the online edition, Oğuz Güven, was arrested on 12 May 2017 in connection with an article on the "accidental" death of Mustafa Alper, the first public prosecutor to file an indictment about the Gülenist Terror Organization (FETÖ). Güven was released pending trial on 14 June 2017.

Today, the newspaper is struggling financially due to a low daily circulation figure that has fallen from more than 150,000 in the mid-1990s, in addition to plummeting advertising revenues as companies are not willing to advertise in media critical of the government.

=== MİT trucks scandal ===
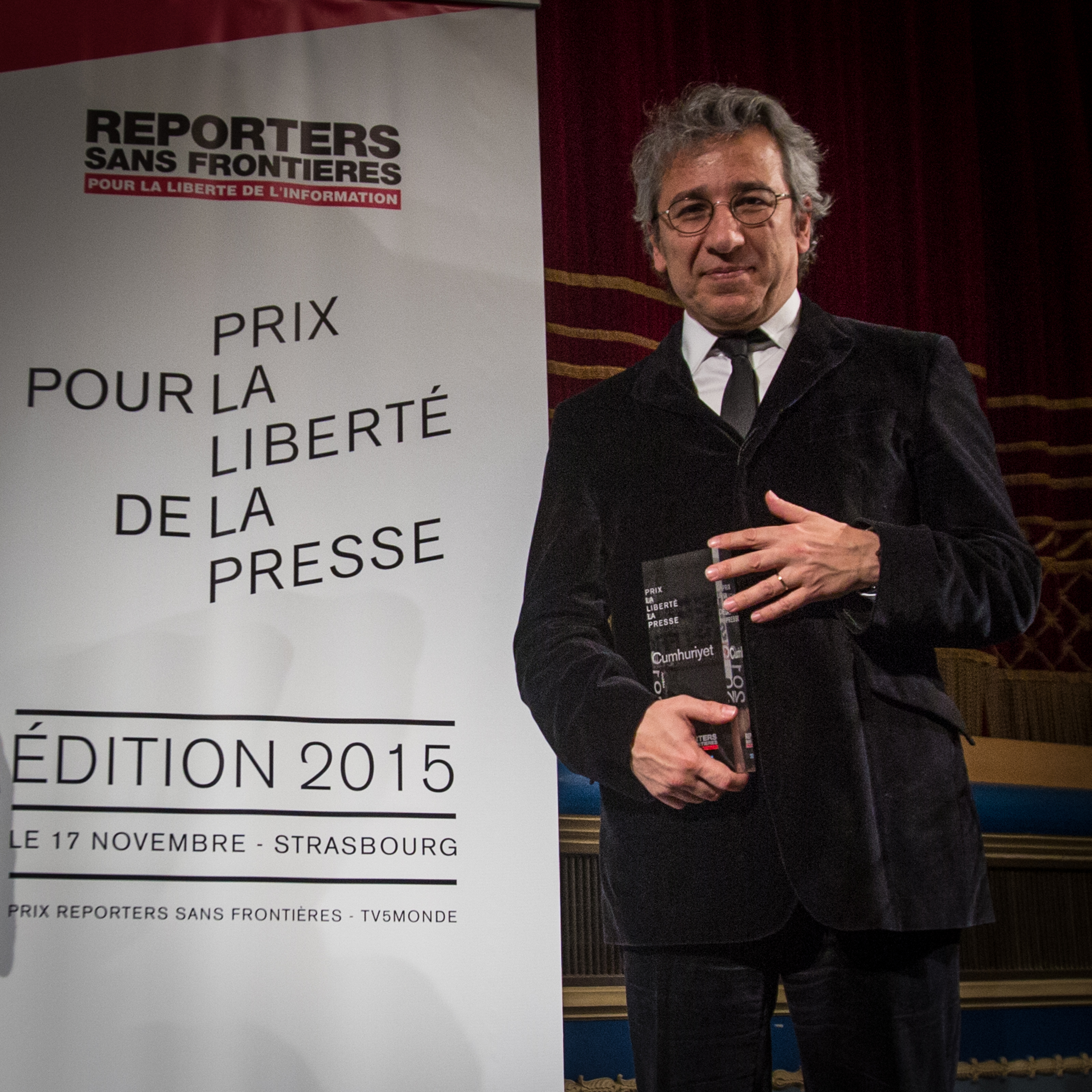
Cumhuriyet's former editor-in-chief Can Dündar receiving the 2015 Reporters Without Borders Prize

Following the appointment of new editor-in-chief Can Dündar, the newspaper on 29 May 2015 released detailed footage depicting trucks of the Turkish National Intelligence Organization (MİT) carrying weapons to Syrian rebels in neighboring Syria. While the government faced calls to resign, an investigation began into Cumhuriyet for releasing the footage. Turkish President Erdoğan publicly targeted Dündar, stating: "I suppose the person who wrote this as an exclusive report will pay a heavy price for this."

In spite of the threats, Cumhuriyet published further material on June 11, including photos and videos confirming that MİT trucks transported both weapons and militants between Turkey and various locations in neighboring Syria.

In November, the newspaper was awarded the 2015 Reporters Without Borders Prize for its "independent and courageous journalism." Shortly thereafter, editor-in-chief Dündar and Ankara bureau chief Erdem Gül were arrested on charges of being members of a terror organization, espionage and revealing confidential documents, facing sentences up to life imprisonment.

== Circulation and online edition ==
In 1924 Cumhuriyet sold 5,000-10,000 copies. On 7 May 1998, the newspaper launched its online edition. The print circulation figure was around 40,000 copies in May 2018.

== Notable contributors (past and present) ==
Columnists
- İbrahim Yıldız (Cumhuriyet'ten Okurlara)
- Cüneyt Arcayürek (Güncel)
- Mustafa Balbay (Gündem)
- Emre Kongar (Aydınlanma)
- Hikmet Çetinkaya (Politika Günlüğü)
- Orhan Erinç (Geçmişten Geleceğe)
- Erdal Atabek (2000'li Yıllarda)
- Erol Manisalı (Bıçak Sırtı)
- Özgen Acar (Kavşak)
- Orhan Birgit (Düz Yazı)
- Ümit Zileli (Düz Çizgi)
- Deniz Kavukçuoğlu (Pano)
- Nilgün Cerrahoğlu (Sağnak)
- Işıl Özgentürk (Al Gözüm Seyreyle)
- Ataol Behramoğlu (Cumartesi Yazıları)
- Sunay Akın (Kule Cambazı)
- Işık Kansu (Ankara Kulisi)
- Hilmi Develi (Satır Arası)
- Bedri Baykam (Görüş)
- Ahmet Cemal (Odak Noktası)
- Leyla Tavşanoğlu (Pazar Söyleşileri)
- Süheyl Batum (Sözden Yazıya)

=== World ===
- Ali Sirmen (Dünyada Bugün)
- Güray Öz (Avrupa)
- Mümtaz Soysal (Açı)
- Özgür Mumcu
- Aydın Engin
- Can Dündar

=== Economics ===
- Şükran Soner (İşçi Evreninden)
- Öztin Akgüç (Yorum)
- Ergin Yıldızoğlu (Dünya Ekonomisine Bakış)
- Erinç Yeldan (Ekonomi Politik)
- Özlem Yüzak (Bilgi Toplumuna Doğru)
- Yakup Kepenek (Ankara Pazarı)
- Yahya Arıkan (Yaşamda Mali Çözüm)
- Mustafa Pamukoğlu (Maliye Tarafından)

=== Science-politics ===
- Orhan Bursalı (Perşembe)

=== Media ===
- Mehmet Faraç (Med - Cezir)

=== Culture-art ===
- Zeynep Oral (Esintiler)
- Turgay Fişekçi (Defne Gölgesi)
- Adnan Binyazar (Ayna)
- Vecdi Sayar (Kedi Gözü)

=== Sports ===
- Arif Kızılyalın (Spor Yorumu)
- Adnan Dinçer (Görüş)
- Ahmet Kurt (Basket Yorum)
- Halit Deringör (Görüş)

=== Deceased contributors ===
- Uğur Mumcu
- Ahmet Taner Kışlalı
- Bahriye Üçok
- İlhan Selçuk
- Muammer Aksoy
- Hüsnü A. Göksel (1969–2002)
- Ümit Kaftancıoğlu
- Cavit Orhan Tütengil
- Onat Kutlar
- Deniz Som
- Metin Toker
- Oktay Ekinci
- Server Tanilli (Bir Bakıma)
- Oktay Akbal (Evet/Hayır)
- Burhan Arpad (Hesaplaşma, 1979-1991)
- Hüseyin Baş (Değişen Dünyadan)
- Türkel Minibaşi (Göz Ucuyla)
- Mehmet Sucu (Enternet)
- Selmi Andak (Sanata Bakış)
- Ali Gümüş (Wrestling)

== Supplements ==
Supplements of the newspaper:

- Strateji (Strategy), Mondays
- Kitap (Book), Thursdays
- Bilim Teknoloji (Science and Technology), Fridays
- Hafta Sonu (Weekend), Saturdays
- Pazar (Sunday), Sundays
- Gezi (Travel), every other Wednesday
- Tarım (Agriculture), once a month
- Yerel Yönetimler (Local Governments)
- Le Monde diplomatique Türkiye (Le Monde diplomatique Turkey), the first Monday of the month (since February 3, 2020)

== See also ==
- List of newspapers in Turkey
- La Repubblica, a newspaper in Italy with a similar name, format and political alignment
- Turkey's media purge after the failed July 2016 coup d'état
