= Ortadoğu =

Ortadoğu (Turkish: lit. 'Middle East') is a Turkish political news website which began as a daily newspaper on 3 May 1972. Ortadoğu is often associated with the Nationalist Movement Party. The print edition of the newspaper was ended on 17 February 2020, but it continues to operate as a website.
