= Server Tanilli =

Turkish academic and journalist (1931–2011)

- Born: 1931; Istanbul, Turkey
- Died: 29 November 2011 (aged 79–80); Istanbul, Turkey
- Burial place: Karacaahmet Cemetery, Istanbul
- Occupations: Academic; Journalist
- Years active: 1960–2011

Server Tanilli (1931–2011) was a Turkish academic and author. While working as an academic he was attacked by the terrorists on 7 April 1978 which left him paralyzed from the chest down. He worked at the University of Strasbourg, France, between 1980 and 2000 during his exile due to the military coup. He returned to Turkey in 2000 and contributed to the Cumhuriyet newspaper.

== Early life and education ==
Tanilli was born in Istanbul in 1931. He received a degree in law from Istanbul University and also, obtained a PhD from the same university.

== Career ==
Following his graduation, Tanilli joined his alma mater and became an associated professor in 1960. Later he worked at Istanbul University as the professor of constitutional law. His courses were mainly about the constitutional law and the history of civilizations.

Tanilli left Turkey after the 1980 military coup in Turkey and worked at the University of Strasbourg, France.

=== Work ===
Tanilli published many books, and most of them were concerned with the Enlightenment and the French Revolution. He was also author of the biographies of the leading French figures, including Denis Diderot, Voltaire, Victor Hugo and Maximilien Robespierre.

His book entitled What Kind of Democracy Do We Want? was seized based on the order of the Turkish State Security Court in 1988.

=== Views ===
Tanilli was a socialist and believed that socialism is the final step of the progressive reason. He argued in 1996 that one of the most significant problems that the Western democracies came across in the 20th century was the totalitarian political parties. For him such parties enjoyed the privileges offered by the liberal political setting, but they did not follow the democratic principles following their election victories.

=== Assassination attempt ===
On 7 April 1978, Tanilli was severely wounded in a terrorist attack. He survived the attack but was paralyzed from the chest down. In early May, he was sent by the Turkish state to London for medical treatment. The perpetrators were allegedly members of the Hearths of Idealism which is a parameter youth group affiliated with the Nationalist Movement Party.

== Later years and death ==
Tanilli returned to Turkey in 2000 and worked for Cumhuriyet newspaper. From 1999, Tanilli was the honorary member of the PEN International. He was recipient of the 2006 Sertel Democracy Prize.

Tanilli died in Istanbul on 29 November 2011. He was buried in Karacaahmet Cemetery.
