= Ümit Kaftancıoğlu =

Turkish writer and radio producer

- Born: 1935; Hanak, Ardahan, Turkey
- Died: 11 April 1980 (aged 44–45); Istanbul, Turkey
- Occupation: Columnist in Cumhuriyet

Ümit Kaftancıoğlu (1935 – 11 April 1980) was a Turkish TV producer, writer and columnist of the newspaper Cumhuriyet.

== Life and career ==
Kaftancıoğlu was born in Saskara village, Hanak, Ardahan Province. He graduated from Cilavuz Village Institute in 1957 and worked as a primary school teacher in Derik in Mardin Province and as a teacher in Balıkesir Necatibey Institute of Education before entering into the Turkish Radio and Television Corporation (TRT).

He won the Grand Award at the 1970 TRT Art Awards with his short story Dönemeç (The Bend), the 1972 Karacan Award with his interview Hakkullah and came third at the Başkent Awards with his short story Linda (Linda).

On 11 April 1980, he was gunned down in front of his home in Istanbul as he was about to get in his car. Later his son married Canan Kaftancıoğlu.

== Works ==
Short stories

- Dönemeç (The Bend, 1972)
- Çarpana (To One That Hit, 1975)
- İstanbul Allak Bullak (İstanbul Is Confused, 1975)

Novels

- Yelatan (Wind-Blower, 1972)
- Tüfekliler (Gunmen, 1974)

Collections

- Köroğlu Kolları (Köroğlu Arms, 1974)

Research

- Altın Ekin (The Golden Harvest, 1980)
- Hınzır Paşa (Hınzır Paşa, 1980).

Children's literature

- Tek Atlı Tekin Olmaz (One Horseman Is Not Auspicious, 1973)
- Kekeme Tavşan (Stammer Rabbit)
- Kan Kardeşim Dorutay (My Blood Brother Dorutay)
- Dört Boynuzlu Koç (Four Horned Ram)
- Çizmelerim Keçeden (My Boats Are Made of Felt)
- Salih Bey (Salih Bey)
- Çoban Geçmez (Shepherd Does Not Pass)

== See also ==
- List of assassinated people from Turkey
