= Ahmet Taner Kışlalı =

Turkish professor, politician, and commentator (1939-1999)

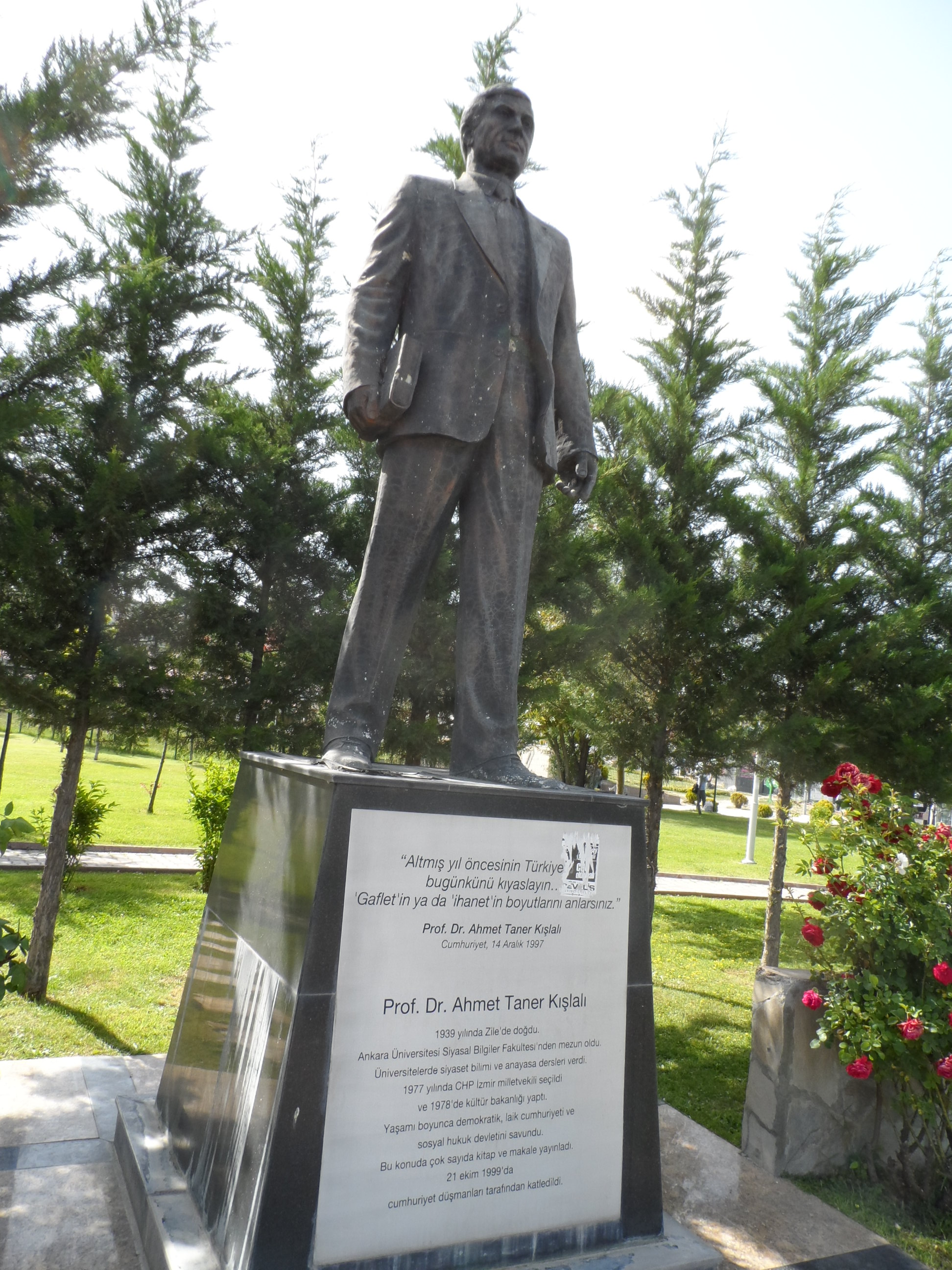

Minister of Culture of Turkey
- In office 5 January 1978 – 12 November 1979
- Prime Minister: Bülent Ecevit
- Preceded by: Avni Akyol
- Succeeded by: Tevfik Koraltan

Personal details
- Born: 10 July 1939 Zile, Tokat, Turkey
- Died: 21 October 1999 (aged 60) Ankara, Turkey
- Cause of death: Assassination by car bomb
- Website: ahmettanerkislali.com

Ahmet Taner Kışlalı (10 July 1939 – 21 October 1999) was a Turkish professor, politician, and commentator. He served in the Parliament of Turkey in 1977 and was minister of culture in 1978 and 1979. He was killed in 1999.

== Biography ==
Kışlalı completed his primary and secondary education in Kilis, and graduated from "Kabataş Erkek Lisesi" high school in Istanbul in 1957.

Kışlalı received a degree from the School of Political Sciences at Ankara University, in 1963, where he was the assistant editor of College newspaper Yeni Gün. He got his PhD on "Çağdaş Türkiye'de Siyasal Güçler" (Political Powers in Contemporary Turkey) from the University of Paris, Department of Constitutional Law and Political Science. He worked as a lecturer in Hacettepe University from 1968 until 1972, then working as an assistant professor at Ankara University, and later an associate professor in 1977.

Politically, he was a Kemalist who adopted the views of democratic socialism and social democracy. In 1977 he was elected to the Turkish parliament, Grand National Assembly of Turkey, as deputy of İzmir. Between the years 1978 and 1979, he was appointed to position of ministry of culture, by prime minister Bülent Ecevit. During his term of ministry, he restarted the effort of printing classical works by the state press, making these available to masses at reasonable prices.

After the military coup of 12 September 1980, Ahmet Taner Kışlalı went back to the academia, and became a full professor in 1988. He continued to give lectures on political science in Department of Communication at Ankara University, after his retirement. Starting from 1991, he had a regular column in the leftist newspaper Cumhuriyet with the title "Haftaya Bakış" ("A View of the Week").

== Death ==
On 21 October 1999, shortly after having faxed his article to Cumhuriyet at 9:40 h local time, Ahmet Taner Kışlalı left his home and headed for his car. As he got in the car, he noticed a package placed at the windshield wiper. He picked it up with his left arm, and at that moment an explosion occurred tearing off his left arm at elbow. His wristwatch penetrated into his head together with bomb shrapnel, killing him instantly. He was 60 years old.

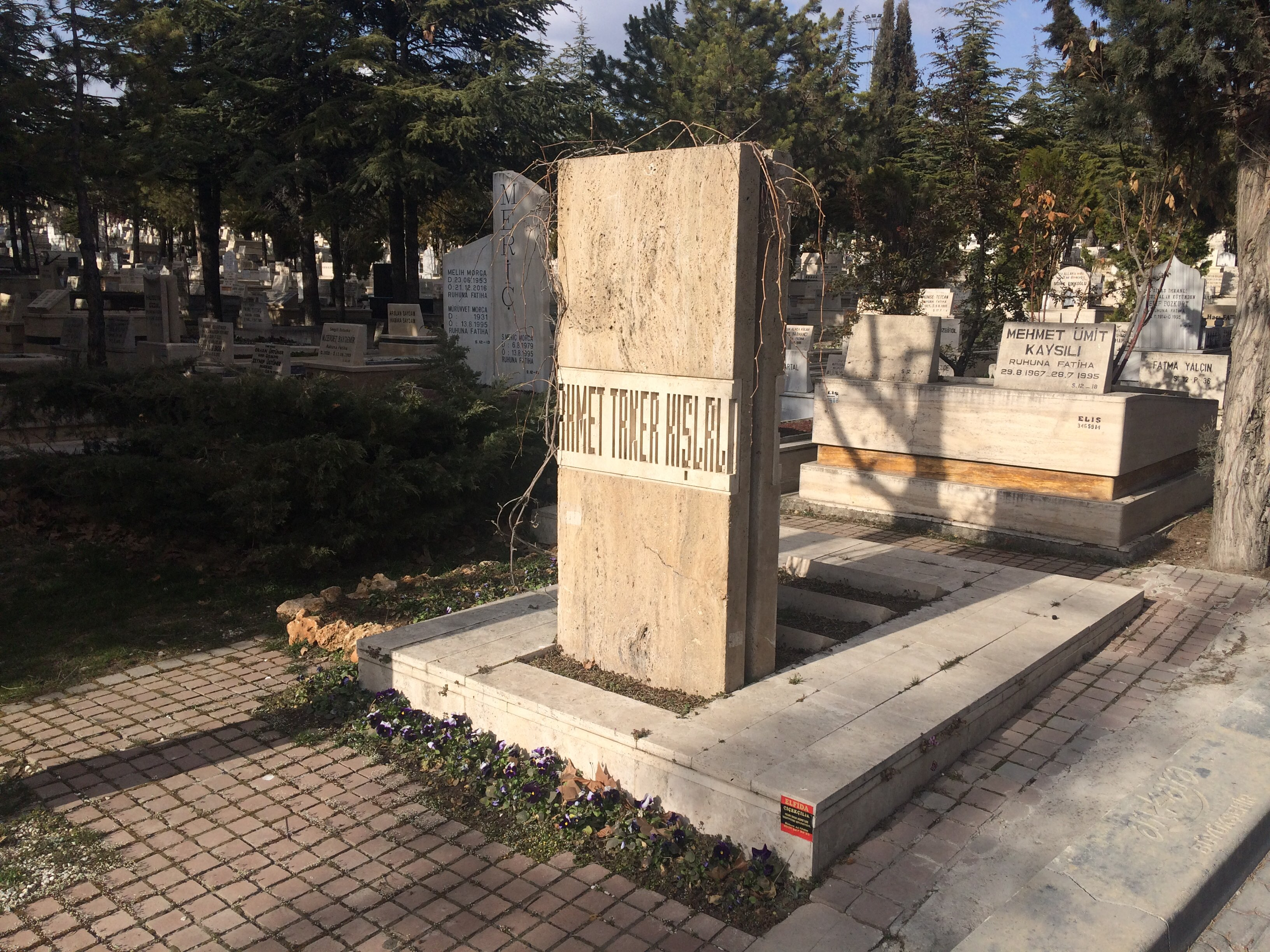
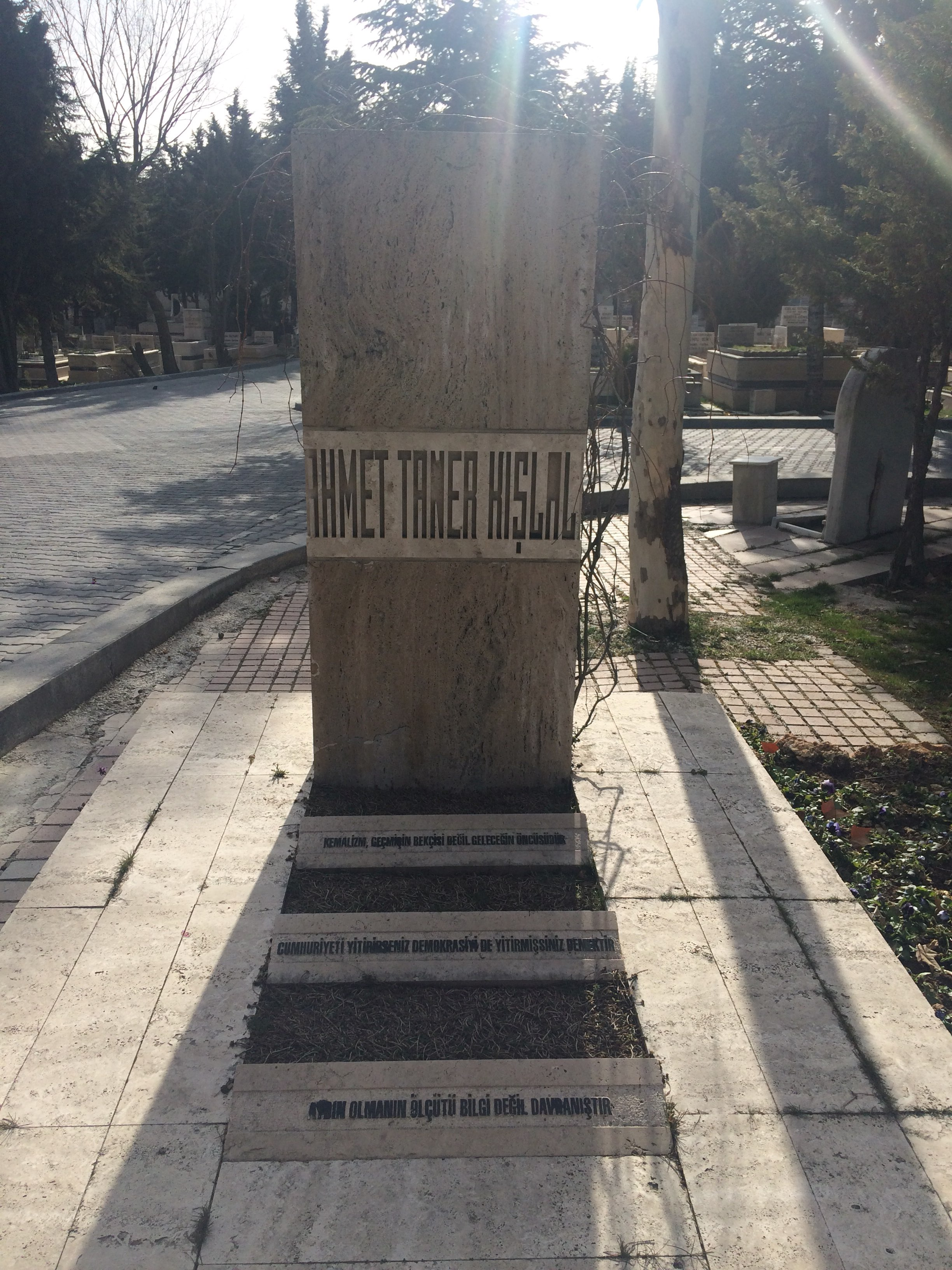
Grave of Ahmet Taner Kışlalı at Karşıyaka Cemetery (the motto in the back of his headstone)

After memorial services held at the Turkish Grand National Assembly, Faculty of Communications in Ankara University, Grand Theatre of Ankara Opera House, Ankara Office of Cumhuriyet newspaper, and religious funeral service at Kocatepe Mosque, he was laid to rest at Karşıyaka Cemetery in Ankara.

== See also ==
- List of assassinated people from Turkey
