= Bahriye Üçok =

Turkish academic of theology, left-wing politician, writer, columnist (1919–1990)

- Born: 1919; Trabzon, Ottoman Empire (now Turkey)
- Died: 6 October, 1990 (aged 70–71)
- Cause of death: Letter bomb
- Education: Ankara University
- Occupations: Politician; writer; columnist; activist
- Political party: Social Democratic Populist Party

Bahriye Üçok (1919 – 6 October 1990) was a Turkish academic of theology, left-wing politician, writer, columnist, and women's rights activist whose assassination in 1990 remains unresolved.

== Early life and education ==
Born in Trabzon in 1919, Bahriye Üçok finished her primary education in Ordu and then graduated from Kandilli High School for Girls in Istanbul. She was educated in Medieval Islamic and Turkish History at the Faculty of Philology, History and Geography of Ankara University. At the same time, she attended the State Conservatory and completed the Opera section.

== Professional career ==
After eleven years working as a high school teacher in Samsun and Ankara, she entered 1953 Ankara University as an assistant in the Faculty of Theology. She obtained her PhD in 1957 and became an associate professor with her thesis on Female Rulers in Islamic Countries in 1965. She subsequently became a professor, being the first ever female university teacher in this faculty. She was fluent in Arabic and Persian, and interpreted Islam in a modern and tolerant way, focusing on the role of women in Islam.

== Political career ==
In 1971, she was appointed a contingency senator by President Cevdet Sunay, and so her political career started. In 1977, Üçok joined the center-left Republican People's Party (Turkish: Cumhuriyet Halk Partisi, CHP). After the military coup in 1980, she co-founded the People's Party (Turkish: Halkçı Parti) and was elected deputy of Ordu into the Grand National Assembly of Turkey in 1984. In 1985, after a merger (with SODEP), her party was renamed the Social Democratic People's Party (SHP).

== Murder ==
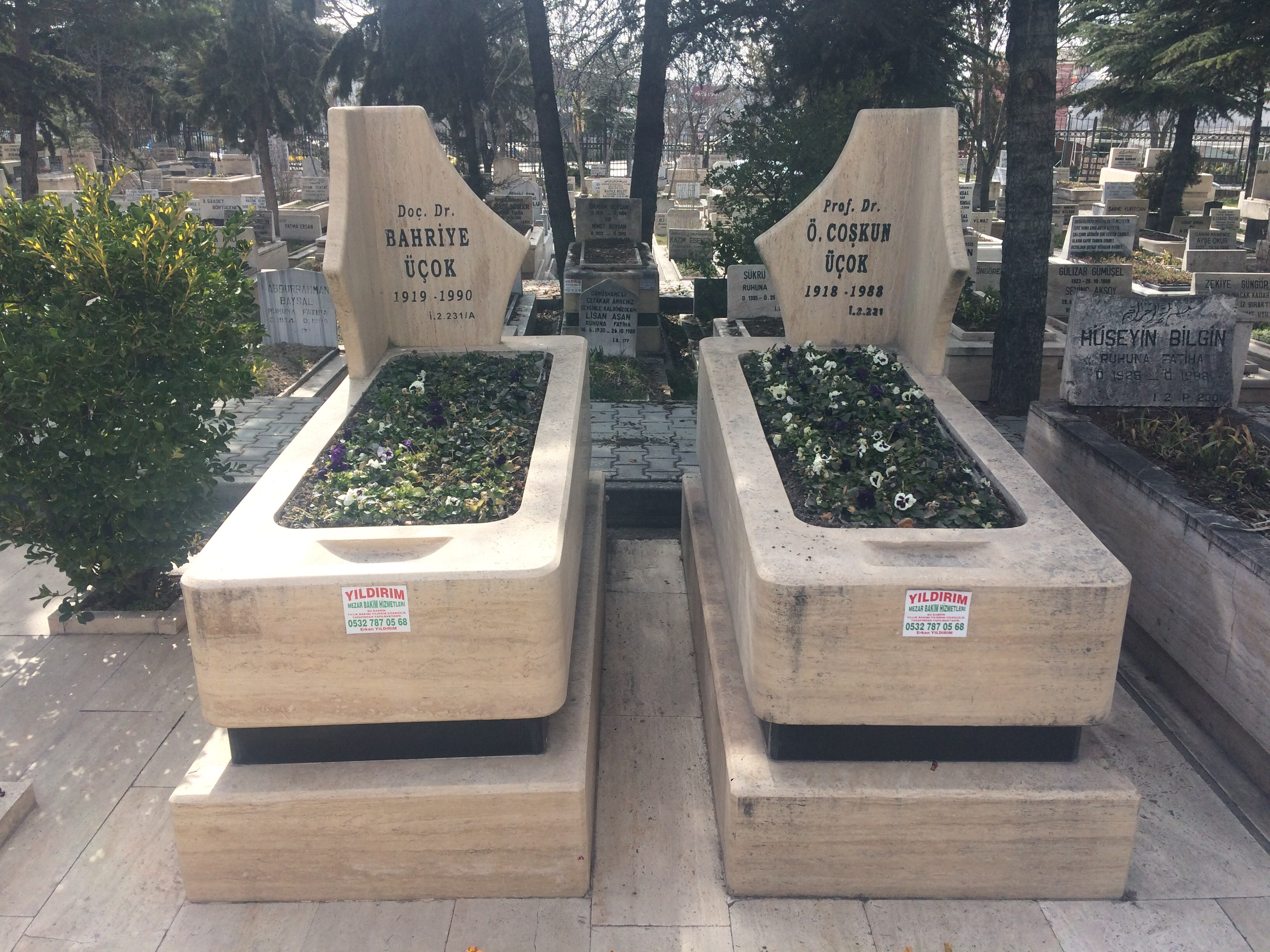
Grave of Bahriye Üçok at Karşıyaka Cemetery.

She also wrote an opinion column in the newspaper Cumhuriyet. After a TV forum, at which she declared that covered dressing in Islam (Hijab) is not obligatory, Bahriye Üçok received increasing threats from the militant organization "Islamic Movement" (Turkish: İslami Hareket). Not long after, on 6 October 1990, she was killed by a letter bomb as she was trying to open a book package in front of her house. The assassination remains unsolved. She was laid to rest at the Karşıyaka Cemetery in Ankara.

== Aftermath ==
Gülay Calap, known as the "parcel-girl" who had accepted the packet for delivery, disappeared for a long period after the assassination. On 16 January 1994, she was arrested in İzmir as one responsible to the Revolutionary People's Party, an organization that is aligned with the PKK. The court sentenced her to prison for 22 years and 6 months, of which she served 12 years. Calap joined the Democratic Society Party (DTP) in 2007 and became its vice president in November of that year.

== Selected works ==
- İslâm'dan Dönenler ve İlk Yalancı Peygamber (Renegers in Islam and the First Fake Prophet) (1967) Ankara
- İslâm Devletinde Kadın Hükümdarlar (Female Rulers in Islamic Countries)
- İslam Tarihi (History of Islam)
- Islam Tarihinde Emeviler - Abbasiler (Umayyads - Abbasids in the History of Islam)
- Atatürk'ün İzinde Bir Arpa Boyu (A Tiny Step in the Footsteps of Atatürk) 270p, (1985), Cem Publishing, Istanbul ISBN 978-975-406-467-4
- Aly Mazahéri, Ortaçağda Müslümanların Günlük Yaşayışları (translation) (Daily Life of Muslims in the Middle Age)

== See also ==
- List of assassinated people from Turkey
- List of unsolved murders (1980–1999)
- Women in Turkish politics
