= Onat Kutlar =

Turkish writer and poet, founder (1936–1995)

- Born: Mehmet Arif Onat Kutlar; 25 January 1936; Alanya, Turkey
- Died: 11 January 1995 (aged 58); Istanbul, Turkey
- Burial place: Aşiyan Asri Cemetery
- Occupations: Writer and poet

Onat Kutlar (25 January 1936 – 11 January 1995) was a prominent Turkish writer and poet, founder of the Turkish Sinematek and cofounder of the Istanbul International Film Festival.

== Biography ==
Onat Kutlar was born in Alanya, Turkey, on 25 January 1936. He was the grandson of Arif Pasha, an Ottoman governor of the Taiz district and the son of Ali Riza Bey, a penal judge of the young Turkish Republic and later a farmer, and Meliha Hanim.

He was raised in Gaziantep. He studied law at Istanbul University and philosophy in Paris. His book, Ishak (1959), composed of nine short stories, most of which are written from the point of view of a child and are often surrealistic and mystical was the recipient of the 1960 "Turkish Language Association Short Story Award". According to the literary critic Fethi Naci, these short stories represent a very early example of magical realism genre. In 1985, he was a member of the jury at the 35th Berlin International Film Festival. In 1994, he was awarded with L'Ordre des Arts et des Lettres and in 1975 Cultural Medal of Poland for his work in the Turkish Sinematek.

He died on 11 January 1995 in Istanbul resulting from injuries sustained in a bomb attack (claimed by İBDA-C, later revealed to be carried out by PKK) which occurred on 30 December 1994 at The Marmara Hotel's cafeteria in Taksim Square, Istanbul. He was laid to rest at the Aşiyan Asri Cemetery. He was married to Filiz Kutlar.

The International Federation of Film Critics (FIPRESCI) Prize in the National Competition of the Istanbul International Film Festival is named after him to commemorate his contributions to the Turkish cinema.

== Bibliography ==
=== Poetry ===
- Peralı Bir Aşk Için Divan (Divan for a Pera Love), 1981
- Unutulmuş Kent (Forgotten City), 1986, translated into French as La Ville Oubliée published by Royaumont

=== Essays and short stories ===
- Yeter ki Kararmasin (Just Let It Not Get Dark), 1984
- Sinema Bir Senliktir (The Cinema Is a Feast), 1985
- Bahar Isyancidir (Spring is Rebellious), 1986
- Gundemdeki Sanatci, 1995
- Gundemdeki Konu, 1995

=== Collection of short stories ===
- Ishak, 1959, translated into Persian, Transl.: Çuka Çekad. Kalagh-e Sefid, Iran 2008, ISBN 978-964-95360-8-8

(A story in Ishak called "Yunus" was published in English in the United States in Grand Street magazine (Winter, 1995)).

=== Screenplays ===
- Yer Çekimli Aşklar (1995) (screenplay)
- Hakkari'de Bir Mevsim (1983) based on the novel 'O' by Ferit Edgu, aka A Season in Hakkari (International: English title), aka Eine Saison in Hakkari (German) directed by Erden Kiral
- Hazal (1979) directed by Ali Özgentürk
- Yusuf ile Kenan (1979) directed by Ömer Kavur

== Filmography ==
=== Producer ===
- Robert's Movie (1992) (producer)
- Kuyucakli Yusuf
- Menekse Koyu (1991) (executive producer), aka Violbukten
- Turkuaz (Documentary)
- Simurg (Documentary)

=== Actor ===
- Yilmaz Güney: Adana-Paris (1995)

== Awards ==
Ishak (1959)

1. Turkish Language Association Short Story Award (1960)

Hakkari'de Bir Mevsim (1983)

1. C.I.C.A.E. Award - Honorable Mention
2. FIPRESCI Prize Competition
3. Interfilm Award - Otto Dibelius Film Award Competition
4. Silver Berlin Bear Special Jury Prize Berlin Film Festival
5. Nominated Golden Berlin Bear

Hazal (1980)

1. San Sebastián International Film Festival—Best New Director Ali Özgentürk
2. Prades Film Festival, First Prize
3. Manheim Film Festival, Golden Ducat Award
4. Mannheim Film Festival, Ecumenical Jury Award
5. Mannheim Film Festival, Audience Award
6. Den Haag Film Festival, First Prize

Yusuf ile Kenan (1979)

1. Milano Film Festival

== Medals ==
1. L'Ordre des Arts et des Lettres, (1994)
2. Cultural Medal of Poland, (1975)

== See also ==
- List of assassinated people from Turkey
