= Uğur Mumcu =

Turkish investigator, journalist who was killed by bomb in his car (1942-1993)

- Cover of Cumhuriyet on the tenth anniversary of Mumcu's assassination
- Born: 22 August 1942; Kırşehir, Turkey
- Died: 24 January 1993 (aged 50); Ankara, Turkey
- Notable credit(s): Editorial opinion columnist and investigative journalist in Cumhuriyet
- Spouse: Güldal Mumcu (m. 1976)
- Children: 2

Uğur Mumcu (pronounced [uˈuɾ ˈmumdʒu]; 22 August 1942 – 24 January 1993) was a Turkish investigative journalist for the daily Cumhuriyet. He was assassinated by a bomb placed in his car outside his home.

== Biography ==
Uğur Mumcu was born the third of four siblings in Kırşehir. He went to school in Ankara and in 1961 attended School of Law at Ankara University. Graduating in 1965 he initially began his career practicing law. In 1969 he ended his legal career to return to his alma mater; working as a teaching assistant until 1972.

He started to write during university, first in the magazine Yön and then in several other leftist periodicals. Between 1968 and 1970, he wrote articles on politics for the newspapers Akşam, Cumhuriyet and Milliyet.

Arrested shortly after the 1971 military coup, he was tortured. He was writing for Ortam, which was a weekly political magazine based in Istanbul when he was arrested. Later, Mumcu wrote that his torturers had told him: "We are the Counter-Guerrilla. Even the President of the Republic cannot touch us."

In 1974, Uğur Mumcu started a career as a columnist, with the daily newspaper Yeni Ortam and from 1975 on, in the daily Cumhuriyet, which he continued until his death.

== Research ==
Uğur Mumcu is hailed as the first investigative journalist of modern Turkey. He published books on current and historical political issues in Turkey. He was investigating the Kurdistan Workers' Party's ties with the National Intelligence Organization (MİT) at the time of his assassination.

Shortly before his death, Mumcu was investigating how 100,000 firearms owned by the Turkish Armed Forces had ended up in the possession of Jalal Talabani, one of the Kurdish leaders of Kurdistan Region, who later held the office of President of Iraq from 2005 to 2014. Twenty-five days after the death of Mumcu, General Eşref Bitlis, who had been investigating the same issue, died in a plane crash, believed to be due to sabotage. In his 8 January Cumhuriyet article, titled Ültimatom, Mumcu emphatically stated that he would soon reveal in a new book the ties between Kurdish nationalists and some intelligence organizations (i.e., Abdullah Öcalan and the National Intelligence Organization).

According to his son Özgür, Mumcu had an appointment with retired prosecutor Baki Tuğ on 27 January to learn more about Abdullah Öcalan's suspected ties with the MİT; the state was officially fighting his militant organization, the Kurdistan Workers' Party. Öcalan was detained on 31 March 1972 while studying political sciences at the Ankara University. Per clause 16/1 of the 1980 Martial Law (№ 1402), he was sentenced to three months in jail for participating in a boycott. He was released on 24 October 1972 after the National Intelligence Organization forwarded a message to the prosecutor handling the case, Tuğ, that one of the suspects was one of their agents. Tuğ later said that he could not remember whether the agent was Öcalan or one of the other suspects.

== Assassination ==
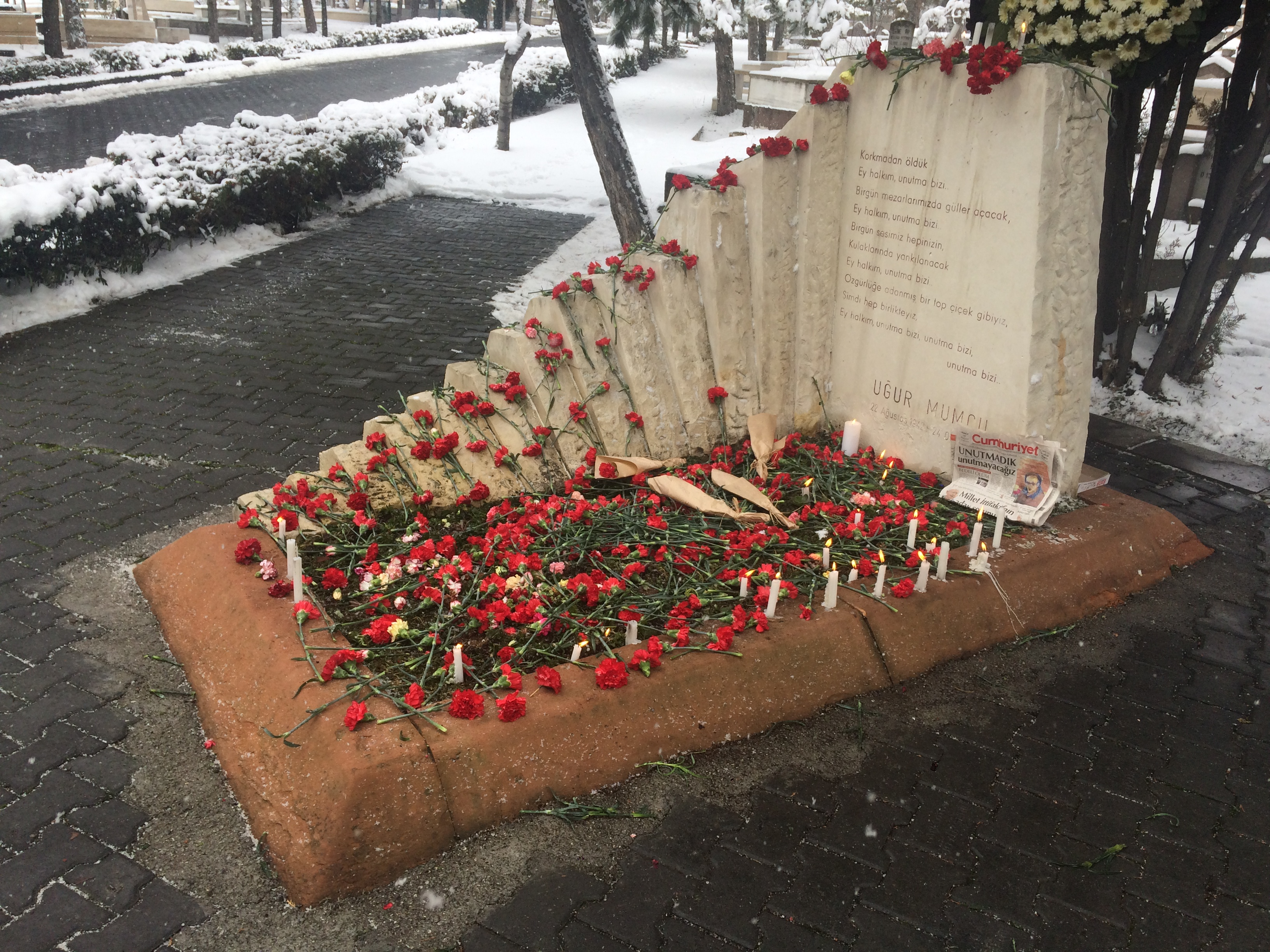
Grave of Uğur Mumcu at Cebeci Asri Cemetery.

On the morning of 24 January 1993, Mumcu left his home and was killed by a C-4 plastic bomb as he started his car, a Renault 12, license numbered 06 YR 245.

There are numerous hypotheses over who was responsible for his murder. Given the various links (at an organizational and personal level) between the Turkish deep state and Turkish armed forces, Counter-Guerrilla, Kurdish forces and the CIA and Mossad, the hypotheses are not necessarily mutually exclusive, especially as Mumcu was investigating some of these links.

=== Deep state hypothesis ===
One hypothesis is that he was killed to protect state secrets regarding the PKK. PKK supreme council member Mustafa Karasu alleged that Mumcu was killed by the state in order to prevent his publicizing the fact that the PKK was aware it had been infiltrated by the MİT. The mole was Öcalan's pilot, Necati. Karasu alleges that they became aware of his MİT identity in May 1997, and misinformed him.

The deep state might have contracted the killing out to JITEM (see below).

=== Iran hypothesis ===
Some sources postulate that Qasem Soleimani, who was killed after an executive order signed by Donald Trump, might have been responsible for Ugur Mumcu's assassination. According to this hypothesis, Iran's Ministry of Intelligence employed the virtually unknown Islamic Movement Organisation (Turkish: İslami Hareket Örgütü) to carry out the assassination. Mehmet Ali Şeker, Mehmet Zeki Yıldırım, and Ayhan Usta were taken into custody. However, it was revealed that the police had falsified the date of their capture.

The İstanbul police had been conducting an operation targeting Islamist organizations just before the attack. Its intelligence chief, Hanefi Avcı, said that the attackers left no trace of their affiliation; they seemed to have been well-trained by a state.

During the investigation, voluminous documents linking Iran to the Sunni organisation Kurdish Hezbollah (Kurdish Sofîk) were found. In addition, the Ankara police detained three suspects who were found to have stayed at a hotel in Ankara before the attack: Yusuf Karakuş, Abdülhamit Çelik, and Mehmet Şahin. Karakuş said that two Iranian spies were involved in the bombing: Muhammed Reza and Muhsin Karger Azad. Çelik, a.k.a. "Abdullah Gürgen", said he reported to Muhsin Karger Azad. Azad was ostensibly a consulate employee, but secretly an alleged Operation Gladio member. Azad left Turkey after he was "named and shamed" in the newspapers along with other diplomats alleged to be spies.

Former Interior Minister Hasan Fehmi Güneş said that there was no doubt in his mind as to Iran's involvement.

The alleged motivation for the Iran hypothesis is that Iran's leaders saw secularism as inimical to Islam and Mumcu had to be killed because he was an outspoken promoter of it. However, others dispute the Iran hypothesis as the assassination coincided with a state visit from Iran to negotiate the passage of the Tabriz–Ankara pipeline, which was then subject to an embargo by the United States. Tensions flared after the assassination and the $25 billion pipeline deal fell through.

=== CIA hypothesis ===
In an earlier investigation, Mumcu had been on the CIA's trail. Working on the Mehmet Ali Ağca case, he was the first to discover the connection between the Turkish mafia and the Turkish extreme right. In his Cumhuriyet column, Mumcu named Ruzi Nazar as the CIA's liaison with the far-right Grey Wolves. The CIA's Turkey station chief, Paul Henze, and an American reporter accosted Mumcu to convince him to write that the Pope's assassin worked for Soviets or the Bulgarians, but Mumcu said he would simply follow the information trail. Henze left with an ominous "If you do that, you might find a nice surprise in store", according to his wife, Güldal.

=== JITEM hypothesis ===
Abdülkadir Aygan, a Gendarmerie Intelligence Organization or JİTEM informant from the Kurdistan Workers' Party ("PKK"), said that the assassination was carried out by JİTEM operatives including Cem Ersever at the behest of General Veli Küçük, who, years later in 2008, was tried for allegedly being a high-ranking member of Ergenekon. Aygan said that he and Aytekin Özen had a briefcase of about 20 kg of C4 obtained from a Vietnam veteran, and that they had used some of it to assassinate the President of the Diyarbakır Bar Association, Mustafa Özer. The unnamed American soldier had allegedly given the explosives to the State of Emergency Regional Governorship (Turkish: Olağanüstü Hal Bölge Valiliği) in 1991 or 1992.

A confidential forensic report, dated 29 January 1993, was prepared by the chief of the Criminal Police Laboratory, Muhittin Kaya. It wrote that the plastic explosive weighed approximately 2.5 kg and contained RDX as used in C4. However, it contradicted itself in explaining its origin, saying Czechoslovakia in the body and the United States in the appendix.

=== MOSSAD hypothesis ===
Uğur Mumcu's brother, Ceyhan Mumcu, finds the evidence for the JITEM/Ergenekon allegations weak. He suspects Israel's involvement since it supported Barzani and Talabani in the Gulf War. Israel's ambassador to Turkey had repeatedly requested to have lunch with Uğur, the only journalist to write about the dealings. Uğur agreed on the condition that he be allowed to bring a witness. The ambassador rejected the offer, and Mumcu died shortly thereafter.

Ceyhan Mumcu said his suspicions were supported by evidence uncovered in the Ergenekon investigation. A report seized from retired General Veli Küçük, dated 2 February 1993 and purportedly emanating from the MİT, says that the CIA and Israel's OADNA were involved.

== Personal life ==
Uğur Mumcu was survived by his wife Güldal, and their children Özgür and Özge Mumcu. Güldal Mumcu and her children established the Uğur Mumcu Investigative Journalism Foundation (Turkish: Uğur Mumcu Araştırmacı Gazetecilik Vakfı) in October 1994.

Numerous parks, streets and monuments have been named after him.

== Bibliography ==
- Mobilya Dosyası, um:ag (October 1975), 279 p., ISBN 975-8084-28-3
- Suçlular ve Güçlüler, Tekin (May 1977), 99 p., ISBN 975-8084-24-0
- Sakıncalı Piyade, um:ag (1977), ISBN 975-8084-20-8
- Bir Pulsuz Dilekçe, um:ag (1977), ISBN 975-8084-22-4
- Büyüklerimiz, um:ag (1978), ISBN 975-8084-06-2
- Çıkmaz Sokak, um:ag, ISBN 975-8084-02-X
- Tüfek İcad Oldu, um:ag, ISBN 975-8084-21-6
- Silah Kaçakçılığı ve Terör, um:ag (1981), ISBN 975-8084-19-4
- Söz Meclisten İçeri, um:ag (1981), ISBN 975-8084-18-6
- Ağca Dosyası, um:ag (February 1982), 175 p., ISBN 975-8084-29-1
- Terörsüz Özgürlük, um:ag, ISBN 975-8084-10-0
- Papa - Mafya - Ağca, um:ag, ISBN 975-8084-15-1
- Liberal Çiftlik, um:ag, ISBN 975-8084-07-0
- Devrimci ve Demokrat, um:ag, ISBN 975-8084-16-X
- Aybar İle Söyleşi, um:ag, ISBN 975-8084-05-4
- İnkılap Mektupları, um:ag, ISBN 975-8084-03-8
- Rabıta, um:ag, ISBN 975-8084-14-3
- 12 Eylül Adaleti, um:ag, ISBN 975-8084-23-2
- Bir Uzun Yürüyüş, um:ag, ISBN 975-8084-11-9
- Tarikat - Siyaset - Ticaret, um:ag, ISBN 975-8084-12-7
- Kazım Karabekir Anlatıyor, um:ag, ISBN 975-8084-08-9
- 40'ların Cadı Kazanı, um:ag, ISBN 975-8084-13-5
- Kürt İslam Ayaklanması 1919-1925, um:ag, ISBN 975-8084-04-6
- Gazi Paşa'ya Suikast, um:ag, ISBN 975-8084-09-7
- Sakıncalı Piyade (play), um:ag, ISBN 975-8084-27-5
- Söze Nereden Başlasam, um:ag (October 1999), 119 p., ISBN 975-8084-79-8
- Bu Düzen Böyle mi Gidecek?, um:ag, ISBN 975-8084-79-8
- Bomba Davası ve İlaç Dosyası, um:ag, ISBN 975-8084-81-X
- Sakıncasız (play), um:ag (November 1984), 112 p., ISBN 975-8084-83-6
- Eğilmeden Bükülmeden, um:ag (2004), 168 p., ISBN 975-8084-84-4
- Kürt Dosyası, Tekin (August 1993), 107 p., ISBN 975-8084-17-8

== See also ==
- List of assassinated people from Turkey
- List of unsolved murders (1980–1999)
