= Republic Protests =

2007 Turkish secularist protests against Prime Minister Erdoğan

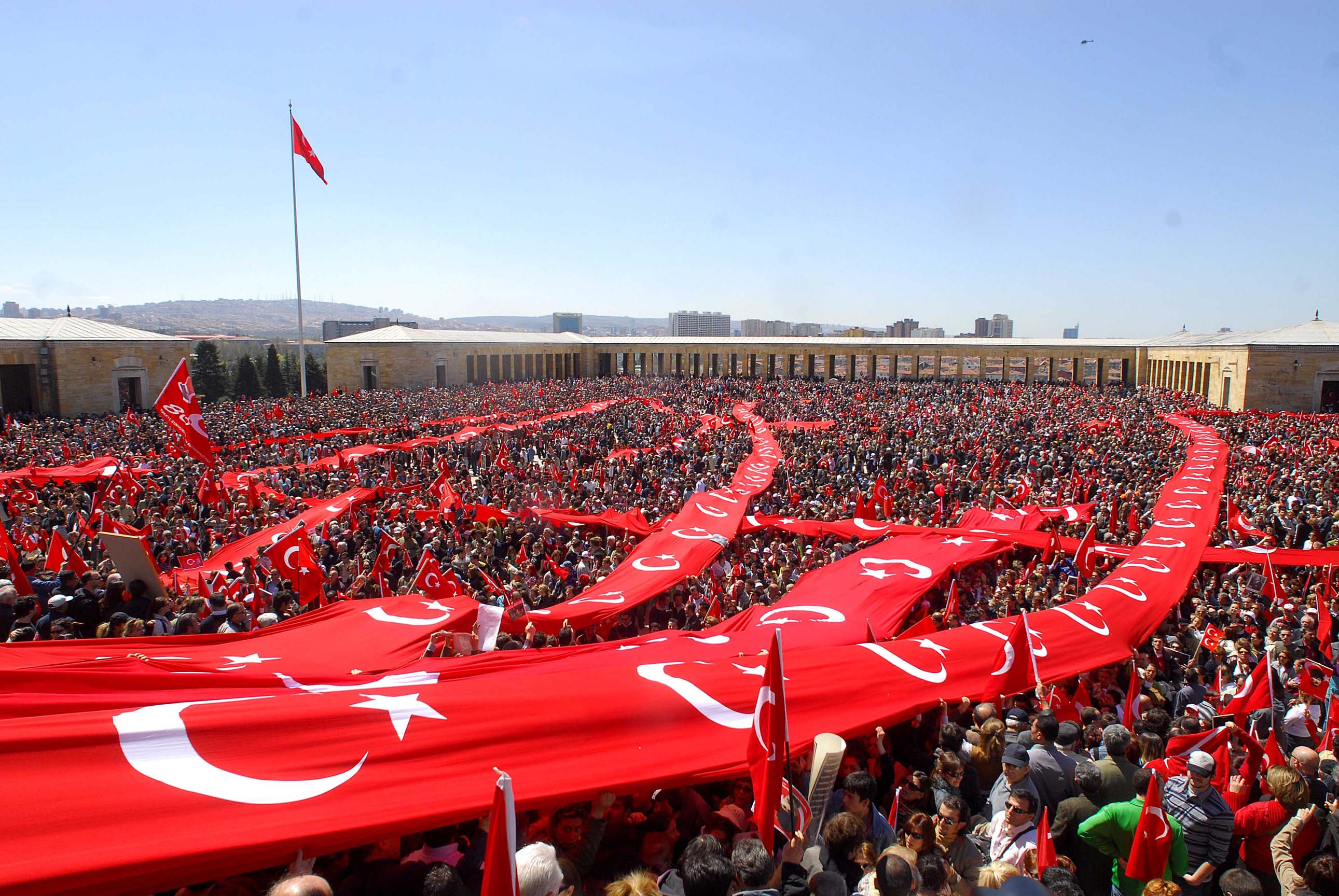
- The April 14, 2007 protest in Ankara crowding the Ceremonial Plaza of Anıtkabir, the mausoleum of the founder of modern Turkey, Mustafa Kemal Atatürk
- Date: 14 April – 13 May 2007
- Location: Ankara, Istanbul, Manisa, Çanakkale, İzmir
- Goals: Maintaining state secularism; Resignation of Recep Tayyip Erdoğan
- Methods: Demonstrations; Protest marches; Civil disobedience
- Status: Ended
- Result: Movement fails, because Erdoğan remains Prime Minister; State secularism weakened Restrictions on wearing headscarves relaxed Abdullah Gül elected and inaugurated as President; AK Party rule continued

Parties
Anti-government protesters: Atatürkist Thought Association; Association in Support of Contemporary Living; Association of Republic's Women; Around 300 non-governmental organizations; Republican People's Party; Democratic Left Party; Social Democratic People's Party; Several universities; Council of Higher Education	59th government of Turkey: General Directorate of Security

Lead figures
Non-centralised leadership	Government leaders: Recep Tayyip Erdoğan (Prime Minister); Ahmet Necdet Sezer (President); Abdülkadir Aksu (Minister of Interior); Muammer Güler (Governor of Istanbul); Kadir Topbaş (Mayor of Istanbul)

Number
Ankara: ~1.5 million people.; Istanbul: More than 1 million people.; Manisa: Tens of thousands participants.; Çanakkale: Started with 25,000 people, then tens of thousands participants.; İzmir: More than 1 million people.	Ankara: 10,000 police officers.; Çanakkale: 400 police officers.; İzmir: 5,000 police officers.

The Republic Protests (Turkish: Cumhuriyet Mitingleri) were a series of peaceful mass rallies that took place in Turkey in 2007 in support of a strict principle of state secularism.

The first rally took place in Ankara on 14 April 2007, just two days before the start of the presidential election process. The second one took place in Istanbul on 29 April. The third and fourth rallies took place consecutively in Manisa and Çanakkale on 5 May. The fifth rally took place in İzmir on 13 May.

The number of people gathering for the first protest in front of Anıtkabir, the mausoleum of Mustafa Kemal Atatürk in Ankara, was cited as ranging from "hundreds of thousands" to 1.5 million people. In the second protest, more than one million people gathered for the protests in Çağlayan square, Istanbul according to AFP and Reuters. The BBC reported hundreds of thousands of people. Over one million people reportedly participated in the fifth rally.

== Antecedent ==
Turkey's preservation and maintenance of its secular identity has been an issue and source of tension long before the demonstration. In the past, Prime Minister Recep Tayyip Erdoğan has spoken out against the active restrictions on wearing the Islamic-style head scarves in government offices and schools, and taken steps to bolster religious institutions. According to the Guardian Unlimited, Erdoğan showed his Islamist nature when he initiated a move in 2004 to criminalize adultery, which eventually failed under intense pressure from the secularist forces in the country and the European Union, which Turkey has been trying to join.

General Yaşar Büyükanıt, Chief of the Turkish General Staff, warned against Islamic fundamentalism in October 2006. Prime Minister Erdoğan replied that there was no such threat. In a press conference two days prior to the demonstration, Büyükanıt stated: "We hope that someone is elected president who is loyal to the principles of the republic — not just in words but in essence." This statement was widely interpreted as a hint from the General urging Erdoğan not to run.

The serving president, Ahmet Necdet Sezer, aimed a clear swipe at Erdoğan the day before the demonstrations by stating, "The threat which Islamic fundamentalism poses to the country is higher than ever." Although the post is mainly ceremonial, the Turkish president has the power to veto laws if he holds them to be in violation of the Constitution of Turkey, as well as to veto appointments to the highest positions of the state administration, such as the presidencies of universities and many public institutions. Sezer, a former chief of the Constitutional Court, did so many times during his years in office. In a recent poll by Hürriyet, a majority of the participants agreed with the president's assessment.

On April 24, foreign minister Abdullah Gül was announced as the official candidate of Justice and Development Party, by Erdoğan. His candidacy was controversial from the beginning due to his background of two proscribed Islamic political parties, and his statement "We want to change the secular system", in an interview published by the Guardian in 1995. Nevertheless, additional concerns were also present, including the effect of the hijab-style clothing of his spouse on Turkey's image, who previously filed a case against Turkey for the ban in the public buildings.

== First rally (Tandoğan, Ankara) ==
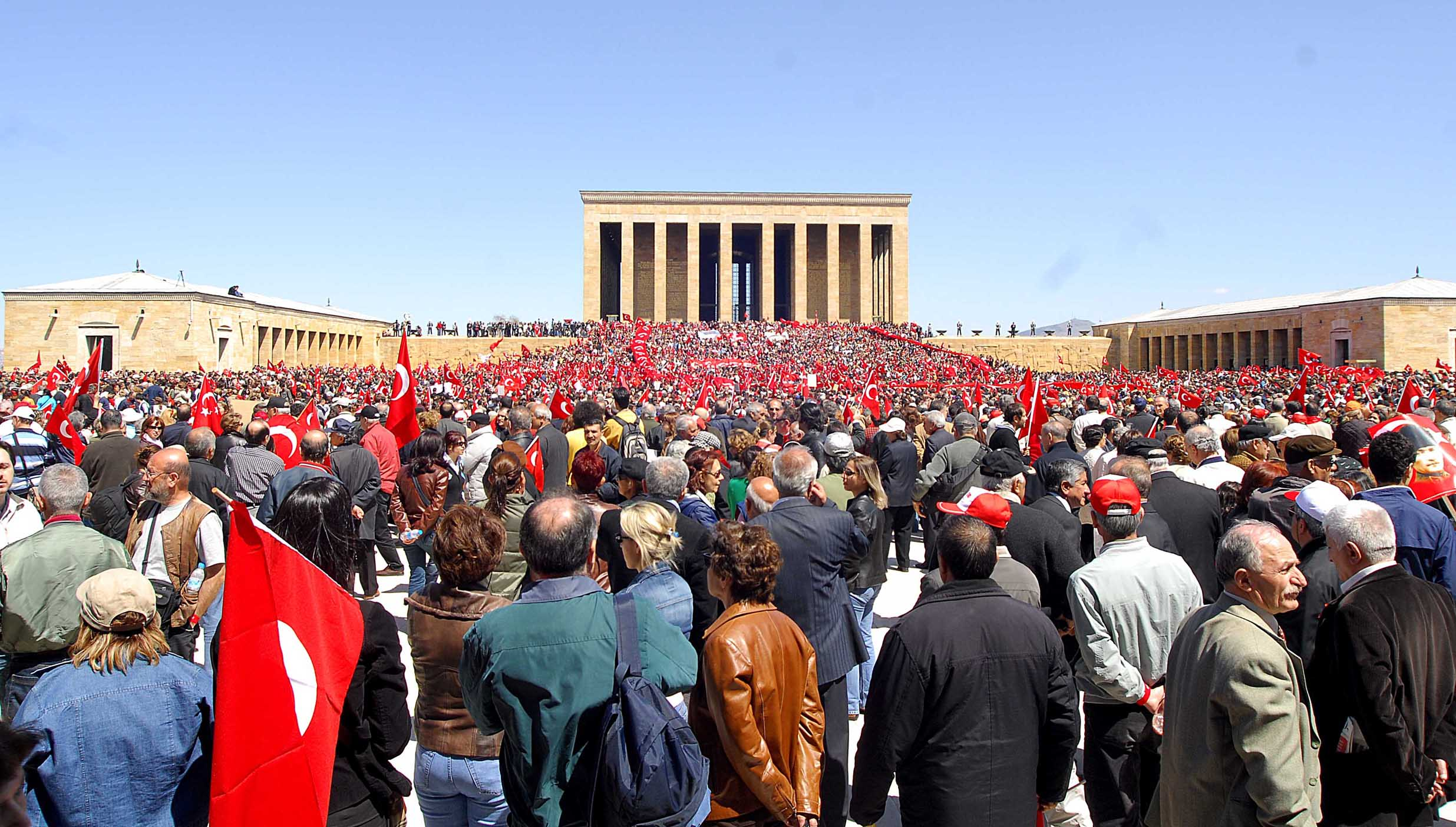
Turkish demonstrators in the large square before the Anıtkabir

On 14 April the first protest took place in Tandoğan square in Ankara. The number of people gathering in front of Anıtkabir, the mausoleum of Mustafa Kemal Atatürk in Ankara, was cited as ranging from "hundreds of thousands" to 1.5 million people. The first protest was one of the largest that Turkey had seen in years until then. The target of the first protest was the possible presidential candidacy of the then Prime Minister Recep Tayyip Erdoğan (the outcome of which will be determined by the Turkish Grand National Assembly (unless the recent modifications on the constitution become ratified on time), in which Erdoğan's Justice and Development Party (AKP) has a healthy majority). Erdoğan decided not to run for president after the rally.

The slogan of the protest was Claim Your Republic (Turkish: Cumhuriyetine Sahip Çık). According to the Ministry of the General Staff of the Turkish Armed Forces, who administer Anıtkabir, 370,000 people visited the monument on that day, but eyewitness accounts from those who participated say that at least twice that amount was not able to enter the crowded grounds (see photo). Police announcements gave conflicting numbers ranging from about 70,000 to 150,000 participants which was criticized among police officials themselves stating "such announcements hurt the credibility of the department." CNN Türk spoke of more than 650,000 at the meeting.

The demonstrators had different motives, including the suspicion that Erdoğan, who is thought to be attached to political Islam, will alter the secular state. Erdoğan's government denies having an Islamic agenda, but according to CNN, some critics argue that the government is inching the country towards increased religious rule. Erdoğan has had run-ins with the law in the past: He was tried and convicted for "inciting religious hatred" and had consequently served a four-month jail term in 2000 while he was the Mayor of Istanbul, Turkey's most populous city. According to the Guardian Unlimited, the pro-Islamic prime minister's party has been eroding secularists' longtime grip on power.

The protest was initiated by the "Atatürk Thought Association" (Turkish: Atatürkçü Düşünce Derneği) and supported by around 300 non-governmental organizations in Turkey. First some 60,000 people who travelled from all over Turkey by bus arrived to the protest in the early hours of Saturday, 14 April. People travelled by train and the residents of Ankara joined the protest overfilling Tandoğan Square and the nearby streets two hours before the official beginning. Among the protesters were also leaders of the opposition parties, Deniz Baykal (CHP), Zeki Sezer (DSP) and some professors of various universities wearing academic regalia. Protesters, waving the Turkish flag and carrying banners depicting Atatürk, chanted "Turkey is secular and will remain secular" (Turkish: Türkiye laiktir laik kalacak) and "We don't want an imam as president!" (Turkish: İmam cumhurbaşkanı istemiyoruz). The demonstration in downtown Ankara ended at 13:00 local time (10:00 GMT). Afterwards, the crowd marched to the Anıtkabir to pay their respect to the founder of the republic.

During the demonstrations, flight above Tandoğan Square and Anıtkabir was banned. Twelve ambulances and eleven police APCs were kept at standby in the surrounding streets. A contingent of 10,000 police officers watched over the crowd, but the demonstration ended peacefully.

Although the demonstrations received international media attention, all but one (Kanal Türk) of the local networks gave the demonstrations very little coverage. Habertürk director Melih Meriç said the lack of local coverage is because of political pressure.

=== Aftermath ===
On 16 April in an interview en route to Germany on board the prime minister's jet, Erdoğan said that the demonstration would not affect his decisions (at the time he had not yet decided whether to run). Bülent Arınç, Speaker of the Turkish Parliament, commented that "they will elect a civilian, democratic and religious president". He also said that "not the regime but the power of the backers of status quo was in danger". In response to the protests Eyüp Fatsa, AKP group chief representative, stated that "if they [AKP] decided to hold such a demonstration they could gather ten times as many people" and that the parliament does not decide based on crowd gatherings. A Reuters article that appeared in the French newspaper Le Monde stated that if Erdoğan became president, Turkey would face its greatest political crisis since the creation of the Turkish Republic in 1923, noting the intricate connections between the secular elites and the army, and that the Chief of the Turkish Armed Forces had warned people of the danger threatening Turkish secularism. The article also reported that the Republican People's Party, the main opposition party, have declared their intention to leave the parliament and ask the Constitutional Court to cancel Erdoğan's running in the elections.

On 18 April Arzuhan Doğan Yalçındağ, the president of the Association of Turkish Businessman and Industrialists (TÜSİAD), stated that she felt Erdoğan would not stand as a candidate in the presidential election.

On 24 April after these weeks of debate over who would run for the presidency, foreign minister Abdullah Gül was put forward as the only candidate. Jonathan Rugman, a British reporter in Turkey for the Guardian, had published an article on 27 November 1995 following an interview with Abdullah Gül, who was then a member of the Welfare Party and made remarks such as "the Republican Era is over" Turkish: Cumhuriyet döneminin sonu gelmiştir. Immediately following the announcement, a group of 14 people was arrested for gathering to protest his candidacy in front of the Çankaya Palace (the presidential complex). After the arrest, smaller groups also gathered, chanting "if carrying the Turkish flag is a crime, take us too" (Turkish: Türk Bayrağı'nı taşımak suçsa bizi de alın). Drivers passing by reportedly showed support by waving flags from their cars. A similar protest took place in Kuğulu park. When asked about this at a reception, General Ergin Saygun responded by quoting the 12 April speech of Yaşar Büyükanıt. When further inquired what he thought about the new commander-in-chief's wife having an Islamic headscarf, Saygun replied by saying that the answer to the question was inside it.

On 25 April when inquired about his wife's Islamic headscarf, Gül responded by saying his wife's decision should be respected and treated as a personal right. The same day there was an assassination attempt on the YÖK president Dr. Erdoğan Teziç who is known for his secularist remarks. Three rounds were fired by a 30-year-old man identified as Nurullah İlgün. İlgün was arrested the same day.

On 27 April, with only 353 parliamentarians present, the AKP failed to achieve a quorum of 367, and Gül's candidacy failed at the first round despite a majority of those present voting in favour. Due to the lack of necessary participation and several alleged violations of the constitution, the vote was taken to the constitutional court to be discussed over the weekend. Later the same day the Turkish Armed Forces released a statement warning that they are a party to this debate and the absolute defender of secularism, and that when necessary they would display their attitudes and actions very clearly. This led to an increase in tensions between the AKP and the Turkish Armed Forces.

== Second rally (Çağlayan, Istanbul) ==
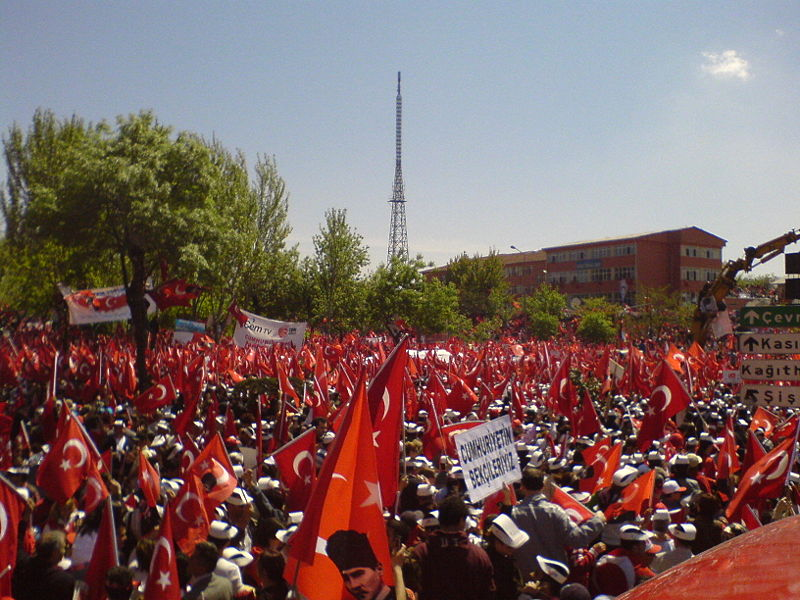
Demonstrators in Istanbul

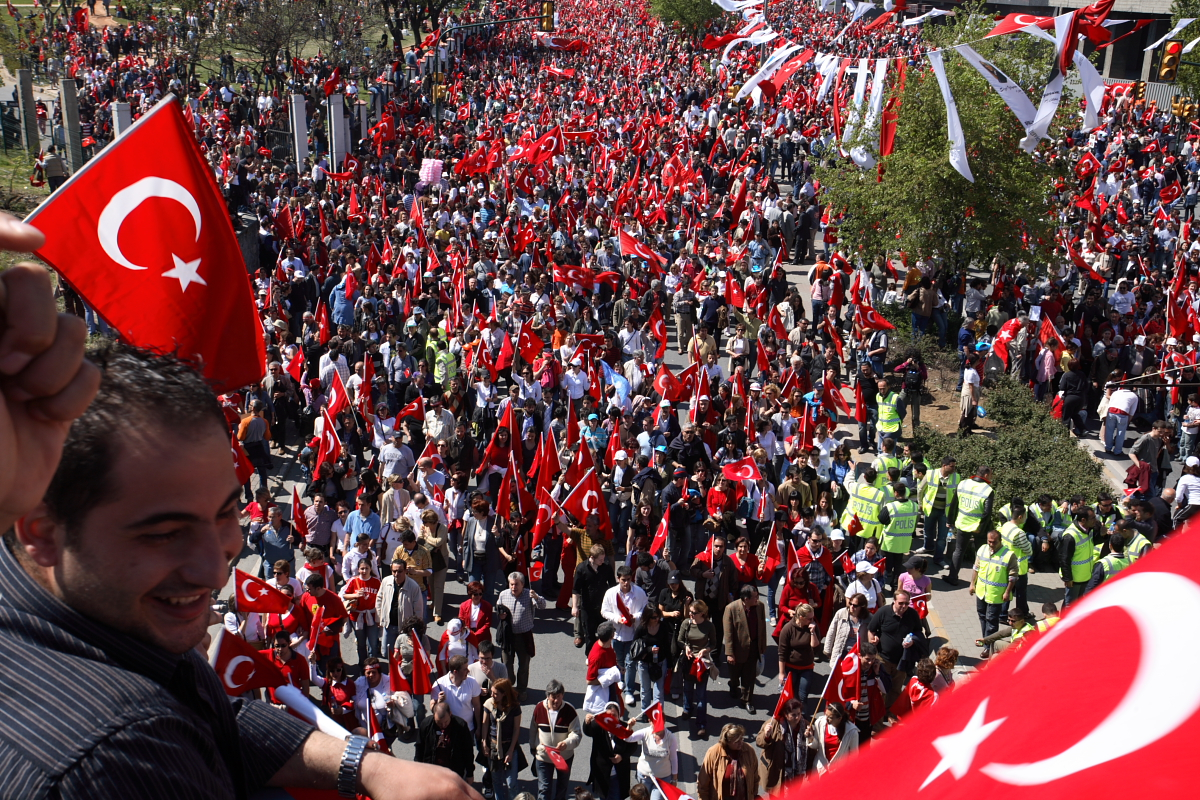
View over Çağlayan square during the rally

On 29 April a second rally was organized to start at 13:00 local time. Hundreds of thousands to more than one million gathered for the second protest at Abide-i Hürriyet (Monument of Liberty) in Çağlayan square in Istanbul in support of secularism in Turkey and against the candidacy of Abdullah Gül in the 2007 presidential election.

The rally was organised by Çağdaş Yaşamı Destekleme Derneği (Association in Support of Contemporary Living), Cumhuriyet Kadınları Derneği (Association of Republic's Women), and other women's NGO's. At 15:22, mobile phone base stations were overloaded. Mobile phones in and around Çağlayan became inoperable.

Tuncay Özkan, owner of Kanaltürk, displayed a video of several previous statements by the then prime minister Erdoğan to the square full of protesters, such as "One can't be a secular and a Muslim at the same time!" (Turkish: "Hem laik hem Müslüman olunmaz!") and "Will this democracy be the goal or the tool?" (Turkish: "Bu demokrasi amaç mı olacak, araç mı olacak?") At 16:30 the protests officially ended without incident.

=== Aftermath ===
On April 30, the Turkish Prime Minister Tayyip Erdoğan told he would address the country amid the crisis over the presidential election that has pitted secularists, including the army, against his Islamist-rooted government.

On May 1 in his public address Prime Minister Erdoğan called for unity. He said: "Unity, togetherness, solidarity, these are the things we need most. We can overcome many problems so long as we treat each other with love,¨ he also said: "Turkey is growing and developing very fast ... We must protect this atmosphere of stability and tranquility,¨

On May 2 the Constitutional Court of Turkey ruled (9-2) that the first round of the presidential elections as void due to insufficient participation. Haşim Kılıç and Sacit Adalı were the only two Constitutional court members who voted against this. Former presidential candidate Abdullah Gül stated that an election should be held as soon as possible and the people should elect the president directly. Erdoğan announced that there would be an early election on 24 June or 1 July. Erdoğan said that the constitutional court decision was a bullet to democracy. Late that night Sabih Kanadoğlu, a former justice in Turkish High Court of Appeals, objected the early vote and argued that it was unconstitutional. He also claimed that these attempts to maneuver around the law would lead to further crisis. Kanadoğlu was also the person who pointed out the "367 parliamentarian requirement" law. A new controversy arose with the approaching end of term of the current president Sezer on 16 May. Speaker of the Parliament Bülent Arınç stated that the current president "would have to unfortunately retire" which would make Arınç the proxy president until a president is elected. However lawmakers argue that the current president would continue to serve until a replacement is elected.

On May 3 Turkey's Parliament moved up elections to July 22, 2007, after the Islamic-rooted ruling party and its secular opposition agreed that an early ballot was the only way out of their standoff over political Islam.

On May 4 the election calendar for the early election has been put forward. A total of 21 political parties have registered to run for the election. A CNN International QuickVote resulted in 24% Yes vs 76% No on a question whether or not the Turkish democracy was hurt by the warning of the Turkish military.

== Third (Sultan, Manisa) and Fourth (Cumhuriyet, Çanakkale) rallies ==
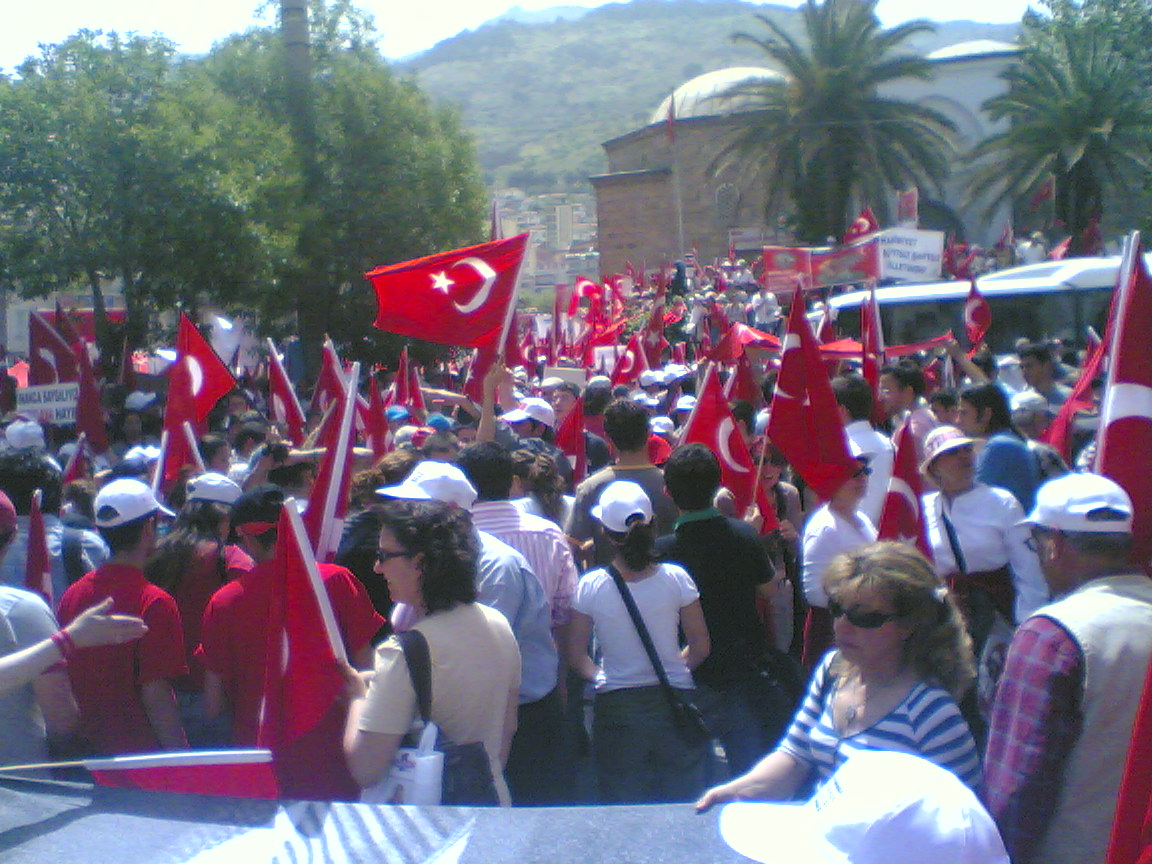
Manisa rally

On May 5 two rallies took place consecutively in Manisa and in Çanakkale with tens of thousands of participants reported at each event.

The rally in Manisa started at 10:00 local time in Sultan square. Manisa is the hometown of Bülent Arınç member of AKP and current speaker of the Turkish parliament.

The rally in Çanakkale started at 13:30 with an estimated participation of 25,000 people. A contingent of 400 police officers watched over the crowd.

=== Aftermath ===
On 6 May Gül announced that he was withdrawing his candidacy right after a second vote which also failed because the parliamentary session did not achieve the 367-member quorum. On 7 May an amendment to the Turkish constitution, allowing the president to be elected directly by the people rather than by a parliamentary vote, was passed by 350 votes to 56. Founder of Borusan Holding Asım Kocabıyık stated that if the AKP gained 50% popular support in the upcoming general elections the country would be lost. On 8 May a request by the Young Party (Turkish: Genç Parti) to move the date for the early election to an earlier date of 22 June was declined. On 9 May president Sezer implied that he would veto amendments to the Turkish constitution, stating that the amendments had been passed at a very heated time. The European Union raised a similar objection. Foreign (non-Turkish) press also reported the expectation of a presidential veto on the AKP's recent amendments to the Turkish constitution.

On 10 May further amendments to the Turkish constitution were officially passed by parliament, 376 to 1. According to the amendments, general elections will be carried out every four years rather than five. The president will now serve a maximum of two five-year terms instead of an unrestricted number of seven-year terms. The president will now be elected by the people rather than the parliament. President Sezer has 15 days to review the amendments and decide whether or not to veto and return the amendments to the parliament.

On 11 May when asked about the amendments to the Turkish constitution, which now allow the president to be elected directly by the people rather than by a parliamentary vote, Gül announced that his candidacy is ongoing, despite stating on 6 May that he had withdrawn his candidacy. YÖK president Dr. Erdoğan Teziç, who survived an assassination attempt on 25 April 2007 criticized the AKP heavily, stating that they do not just seek political power but also increased government power and also are trying to use YÖK to this end.

On 12 May a bomb placed on a bicycle was detonated in a market in İzmir wounding fifteen people just a day before the scheduled "republic protest" in the city. One of the wounded was in a critical condition and later died in the hospital while most of the others were lightly wounded and were released from the hospital the same day. No one claimed responsibility for the bombing. A second abandoned bicycle caused some panic but it was later determined that it was harmless.

== Fifth rally (Gündoğdu, İzmir) ==
Çağlayan rally – people marching with Turkish flags

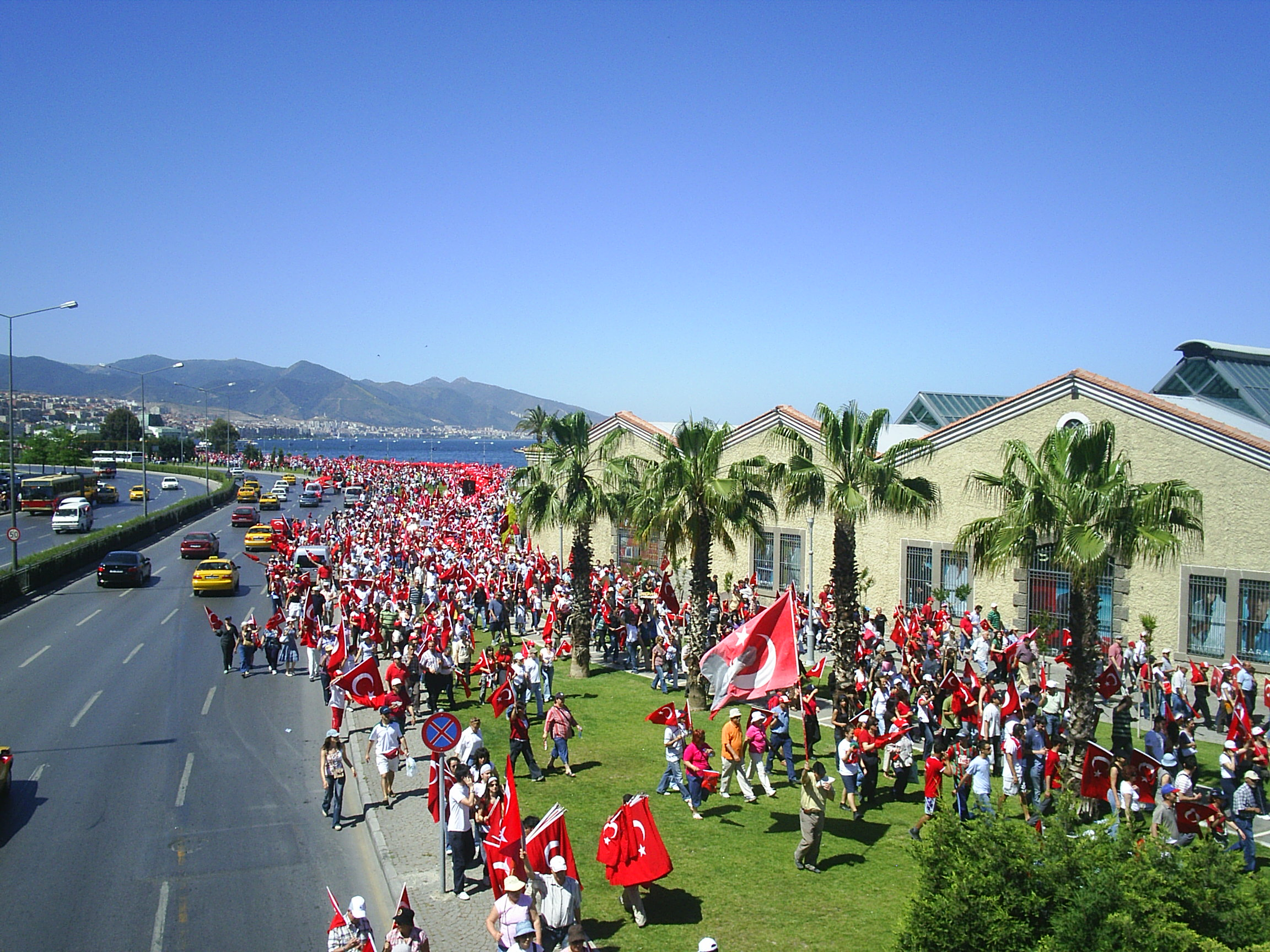
Demonstrators on their way to Gündoğdu Square, İzmir

On May 13 a fifth rally took place in Gündoğdu square, İzmir. Reportedly over one million people gathered in İzmir for the rally to demand their country remain a secular state, stepping up pressure on the Islamist-rooted Justice and Development Party (AKP) government before July elections. The municipal harbor officials confirmed that just the number of citizens traveling by public ferry to the event site numbered over 350,000.

Leaders of the three leftist parties, namely Deniz Baykal of the CHP, Zeki Sezer of DSP, and Murat Karayalçın of SHP were also among the demonstrators. Security for the event was tightened with 5,000 police officers watching over the rally.

== Slogans from the rallies ==
Some of the slogans used by protestors from the rallies include:

- [We demand] neither sharia, nor a coup, but a totally independent Turkey. (Turkish: Ne şeriat ne darbe, tam bağımsız Türkiye.)
  Referring to the statement by the Turkish Armed Forces with "coup" reference. Referring to the roots of Erdoğan and Gül with "sharia" reference
- Turkey is secular, and it will remain secular! (Turkish: Türkiye laiktir, laik kalacak!)
- We don't want an imam in Çankaya. (Turkish: Çankaya'da imam istemiyoruz.)
  Referring to the background of Erdoğan
- Tayyip take a look at us, count how many of us there are! (Turkish: Tayyip baksana, kaç kişiyiz saysana!)
  Referring to the disdainful statements of Erdoğan after the first protest "Goodness gracious, they're talking about millions" (Turkish: Aman yarabbi, milyonlar falan)
- Buy Tayyip, get Aydın Doğan for free! (Turkish: Tayyip'i alana, Aydın Doğan bedava!)
  Referring to the Turkish media's lack of coverage of the Tandoğan rally. Media magnate Aydın Doğan's holding company owns 3 major news channels, including CNN Türk, and 5 major newspapers

== See also ==
- Gezi Park protests
- Secularism in Turkey
- 2007 Turkish presidential election
- 2007 Turkish general election
- 2002 Turkish general election
