= Yekta Güngör Özden =

Turkish judge

Yekta Güngör Özden (born 1932) is a Turkish judge, and former president of the Constitutional Court of Turkey.

He was born in Niksar, a town in Tokat province of Turkey, in 1932. He was the president of the Constitutional Court of Turkey, from 8 May 1991 until 8 May 1995, and from 23 May 1995 until 1 January 1998, when he retired. He also was the head of "Atatürkçü Düşünce Derneği" (ADD), a leading Turkish non-governmental organization, that has organized Republic Protests, a peaceful mass rally of more than 300,000 people, in Ankara, on 14–15 April 2007.

Recently, he was implicated in the Ergenekon scandal, for allegedly being a CIA agent. The journalist who made the accusation, Zihni Çakır, has been detained on charges of acquiring state secrets and fraudulent bankruptcy.

== Notes ==
Court offices
Preceded by Necdet Darıcıoğlu	President of the Constitutional Court of Turkey; 8 May 1991–1 January 1998	Succeeded by Ahmet Necdet Sezer
