= Emre Buga =

Turkish news presenter and editor

- Born: 7 August 1977 (age 48); Istanbul, Turkey
- Occupation: News presenter

Emre Buga (born 7 August 1977) is a Turkish news presenter and editor.

After graduating from Kabataş High School, Emre Buga continued his education in the electronics and communication engineering department of Yıldız Technical University. He began working as a presenter for the first time when the university sent him to Show TV to do his internship. In the following years, Buga served as news anchor and editor at Show Radio and Radyo5.

Shortly thereafter, he switched to television and broadcast news on Dokuzuncu Kanal and BRT. In 2000, he joined Tuncay Özkan's team and was brought to Kanal D's main news program. After moving to Show TV with the team in 2002, Özkan started working in Kanaltürk following its establishment in 2004. Buga, who continued his duty after the channel was sold to Koza İpek Holding in 2008, also made a program for the news channel Bugün TV, which was founded by the same group. In 2016, with the closure of the channel, he focused on his instructional role in Dialog Lecture and Communication, a filed he had worked on for many years.

In 2018, Buga prepared and presented a food program for TGRT Haber titled Bekar Mutfağı, after which he began news presenting again by joining main news program of the newly established TV100 in 2019.
