= Tülay Tuğcu =

Turkish judge (born 1942)

President of the Constitutional Court of Turkey
- In office 25 July 2005 – 12 June 2007
- Preceded by: Mustafa Bumin
- Succeeded by: Haşim Kılıç

Personal details
- Born: 12 June 1942 (age 84) Ankara, Turkey

Tülay Tuğcu (born 12 June 1942) is a retired Turkish judge. She was the president of the Constitutional Court of Turkey, chief justice of Turkey. She retired on 12 June 2007.

== Biography ==
Tuğcu was born in Ankara and attended TED College for primary and high school. In 1961, she enrolled in Ankara University Faculty of Law and graduated in 1965. After working as a lawyer for four years, she successfully passed the exams required to start working at the Council of State (Turkish: Danıştay) as assistant to Council of State.

In 1974, Tuğcu graduated from Institute of Public Administration of Turkey and the Middle East (Turkish: Türkiye ve Ortadoğu Amme İdaresi Enstitüsü - TODAİE) in Ankara.

In 1982, Tuğcu was appointed to the senior judicial post of investigation at first department of the Council of State, where she served until 1992.

In 1992, Tülay Tuğcu was elected member of Turkish Council of State and started serving at the sixth department. After three years, she was transferred to the tenth department of Council of State and continued serving there.

On 22 December 1999 Tuğcu was appointed as a member of the Constitutional Court by President Ahmet Necdet Sezer among three candidates determined by the General Assembly of State Council.

Thereafter, Tuğcu was elected president of the Court of Jurisdictional Disputes on 6 January 2004 and as chief of the Supreme Court on 25 July 2005 consequently.

== Other facts and information ==
Tuğcu holds two theses in "Extradition of Criminals" and "The Use of Approval Rights of Administration by High Officials" and a translation in "Productivity".

Tuğcu is married and has two children.

In one of her messages to the public on Supreme Court’s official website, Tuğcu said:

"... if we want to name the age we are living in, the best can be the "age of communication". In order to be able to adjust to this age, people’s rights to access the information, the sharing of the accessible information and making it common must be provided. Even though it has not been clearly arranged in our constitution, the right to access the information is a "sine qua non" of basic rights and freedom. Without doubt, the internet websites of the public institutions that are equipped with the latest and satisfactory information play a crucial role in managing it."

== Notes ==
Court offices
Preceded by Mustafa Bumin	President of the Constitutional Court of Turkey; 25 June 2005 – 12 June 2007	Succeeded by Haşim Kılıç
