= Zühtü Arslan =

President of the Constitutional Court of the Republic of Turkey (2015–2024)

President of the Constitutional Court of Turkey
- In office 10 February 2015 – 20 April 2024
- Preceded by: Haşim Kılıç
- Succeeded by: Kadir Özkaya

Personal details
- Born: 1 January 1964 (age 62) Sorgun, Yozgat, Turkey
- Education: Faculty of Political Science, Ankara University (BA); University of Leicester (MA, PhD)

Zühtü Arslan (born 1 January 1964) is a Turkish judge and former president of the Constitutional Court of Turkey.

== Biography ==
Arslan was born in Sorgun district of the Yozgat Province in Turkey. In 1987 he graduated from the School of Political Science, Ankara University. He got his master's and doctorate degree from University of Leicester in 1996. He later worked as a president of the Turkish National Police Academy. On 10 February 2015, he was elected as the deputy president of the court.

He is married with four children.

Legal offices
Preceded by Haşim Kılıç	President of the Constitutional Court of Turkey; 10 February 2015 – 20 April 2024	Succeeded by Kadir Özkaya
