= Hakkı Ketenoğlu =

Turkish judge (1906–1977)

Hakkı Ketenoğlu (1906 – 1977) was a Turkish judge. He was president of the Constitutional Court of Turkey from 15 December 1970 until 14 July 1971.

Legal offices
Preceded by İbrahim Senil	President of the Constitutional Court of Turkey; 15 December 1970–14 July 1971	Succeeded by Muhittin Taylan
