= Hasan Tahsin Gökcan =

Turkish judge (born 1965)

Hasan Tahsin Gökcan (born February 2, 1965) is a Turkish judge. He graduated from Ankara University Law School in 1987 . He started his career as a candidate for Ankara judgeship, then served as Fındıklı, Tuzluca and Bozüyük judge and then as a Court of Cassation examining judge. On February 24, 2011, he was appointed as a member of the Court of Cassation and while he was a member of the 4th Criminal Chamber of the Court of Cassation, he was among the candidates nominated by the general assembly of the Court of Cassation for the membership of the Constitutional Court of Turkey and was appointed as a member of the Constitutional Court of Turkey by President Abdullah Gül on March 17, 2014. On March 26, 2019, he was elected as the deputy president of the Constitutional Court of Turkey, effective from April 10, 2019.
