= Buket Aydın =

Turkish TV presenter

- Born: 1 January 1985 (age 40); Bursa, Turkey
- Citizenship: Turkey
- Education: Istanbul Kültür University
- Occupation: TV presenter
- Years active: 2010–present
- Employer(s): Kanaltürk, TRT Türk, NTV, Kanal D
- Spouse: Erce Baykal (m. 2013; div. 2020)

Buket Aydın (born 1 January 1985) is a Turkish TV presenter.

She graduated from the Department of Turkish Language and Literature at Istanbul Kültür University. She completed her master's degree in Attila İlhan's poems. She later completed the Kuşdili Speaker and Presenter Course in Kadıköy with good grades. After a year as a news anchor on a private radio station, she joined the Kanaltürk channel where she served as the sports bulletin announcer and later as the host of the main news bulletins. After leaving Kanaltürk, she transferred to TRT Türk and served as a presenter. In April 2011, Buket Aydın transferred to NTV, which was recently restructured, and started to serve as a news presenter.

After presenting the Night Bulletin Generation starting at 23:00 on weekdays and the Main News Bulletin starting at 20:00 on NTV, Aydın switched to Kanal D in April 2018 and started to present the Main News Bulletin there. She is also a lecturer at the Department of Radio, Television and Cinema at Nişantaşı University.

== Awards ==
- Best News Announcer Award, Düzce University
- 2016 Anadolu Media Awards
- 4th Fashion TV Eyewear Mode Awards (Best Dressed Female News Presenter)
- Internet Media Best of the Year Awards, (Female News Announcer of the Year Award)
- Internet Media Best of the Year Awards, (Night News Bulletin of the Year, 'Gece Bülteni Kuşağı')
