= Muhittin Taylan =

Turkish judge (1910–1983)

Muhittin Taylan (1910–1983) was a Turkish judge. He was president of the Constitutional Court of Turkey from 14 July 1971 until 13 July 1975. In March 1973 his name was proposed as a candidate for the Turkish presidency.

Court offices
Preceded by Hakkı Ketenoğlu	President of the Constitutional Court of Turkey; 14 July 1971–13 July 1975	Succeeded by Kani Vrana
