= Şevket Müftügil =

Turkish judge (1917–2015)

Şevket Müftügil (7 August 1917 – 22 April 2015) was a Turkish judge. He was the president of the Constitutional Court of Turkey from 24 October 1978 until 7 August 1982.

Court offices
Preceded by Kani Vrana	President of the Constitutional Court of Turkey; 24 October 1978 – 7 August 1982	Succeeded by Ahmet Hamdi Boyacıoğlu
