= Basri Bağcı =

Turkish jurist

- Born: 11 September 1967 (age 59)
- Education: Ankara University (LLB); Exeter University (LLM)

Basri Bağcı (born 11 September 1967) is a Turkish jurist and member of the Constitutional Court of Turkey. He is also one of Turkey's ad hoc judges at the European Court of Human Rights.

== Career ==
In 2017, he was elected as a member of the Supreme Court of Appeals by the Council of Judges and Prosecutors.

He was elected as a member of the Constitutional Court by President Recep Tayyip Erdoğan among the three candidates nominated by the Grand General Assembly of the Supreme Court of Appeals in 2020 and took office on April 6, 2020, and became the vice president of the Constitutional Court on April 16, 2024.

He participated in the work of the Judicial Unity Platform, which was established under the coordination of the Ministry of Justice in 2014, when he served as Deputy Undersecretary of the Minister of Justice. The Unity in Judiciary Platform, whose work he personally participated in, gained association status on March 27, 2015, and was renamed the Unity in Judiciary Association. Bağcı was among the founding members of the Judicial Unity Association.
