= Şerafettin Elçi =

Turkish politician

Minister of Public Works
- In office January 5, 1978 – November 12, 1979
- Prime Minister: Bülent Ecevit
- Preceded by: Mehmet Selahattin Kılıç
- Succeeded by: Mehmet Selahattin Kılıç

Personal details
- Born: March 14, 1938 Cizre, Şırnak Province, Turkey
- Died: December 25, 2012 (aged 74) Ankara, Turkey
- Party: Participatoric Democracy Party (KADEP)
- Spouse: Fatma Elçi
- Children: 7
- Education: Law
- Alma mater: Ankara University, Law School
- Occupation: Politician, lawyer

Şerafettin Elçi (14 March 1938 – 25 December 2012) was a Kurdish lawyer, politician, government minister and statesman in Turkey. He was one of the pioneers of Kurdish politics in Turkey.

== Early years ==
Şerafettin Elçi was born in Cizre, Şırnak Province on 14 March 1938. He finished primary education in his hometown. After completing secondary education in Mardin, he studied law at Ankara University, Law School and graduated in 1964.

During his university years, he was tried in the "Case of Kurdish Propagandists" (Turkish: Kürtçülük Davası), so-called "Case of the 49s" under accusation of making Kurdish propaganda.

After graduation, he pursued a career as a lawyer in Cizre. Following the 1971 Turkish coup d'état, Şerafettin Elçi was tried along with the members of the "Turkey Kurdistan Democratic Party" at the Diyarbakır Military Court, and was incarcerated in the Diyarbakır Military Prison for about eight months.

== Political career ==
Following the general elections held on 5 June 1977, Elçi entered the parliament as a deputy for the Justice Party (AP) representing the Mardin Province. He was then among the eleven politicians, who left Süleyman Demirel's (AP) and was offered on December 22, 1977, he was offered the post of a minister in the newly formed cabinet by Republican People's Party (CHP) leader Bülent Ecevit in return of his acceptance to back up a motion of no confidence to overturn Demirel's cabinet. He was appointed Minister of Public Works in the Ecevit cabinet serving from 5 January 1978 to 12 November 1979. As a Minister, he attracted a lot of interest by the media as he undertook an extensive journey to the southeastern provinces on a tour accompanied by reporters. He demanded more governmental support and development for and criticized the ongoing "fascist terrorism" in the region. As in 1979 he traveled to London, United Kingdom due to health issues, it was rumored he could have met with revolutionary Kurds from Iraq. Then also Ecevit denounced a threat of "internal separatists". Elçi then made some explicit statements about the Kurdishness mentioning that he is himself is a Kurd and demanded a change regarding the Governmental approach towards the Kurds and a clarification whether someone is a separatist who says he is a Kurd or one who aims to establish a separate Kurdish country.

After the military coup staged on 12 September 1980, Elçi was among the many arrested politicians. He was tried for his words "There are Kurds in Turkey, I am also a Kurd." during his tenure as Minister of Public Works. He was tried by the Supreme Court (Turkish: Yüce Divan) and convicted to two years and four months in prison and an additional ban to serve in civil service for fourteen months. He spent more than thirty months in custody. As a result of these punishments, some of his civil and political rights, such as to pursue his lawyer career or to return to politics, were suspended for a span of ten years.

In 1982, Şerafettin Elçi was put on trial before the Supreme Court (Turkish: Yüce Divan) for charges on bribery and abuse of power during his office term as government minister. He was acquitted on charges of bribery, but sentenced to two years four months imprisonment for abuse of power.

In 1992, Elçi established with 98 Kurdish intellectuals the "Kurdish Rights and Freedom Foundation" (Turkish: Kürt Hak ve Özgürlükler Vakfı), and became its president of the board of trustees. After a long judicial struggle against the authorities, he succeeded in 1995 in getting the organization registered as the "Kurdish Culture and Research Foundation" (Turkish: Kürt Kültür ve Araştırma Vakfı). Through this action, an organization with the word "Kurdish" in its title became official for the first time in the history of Turkish Republic.

Elçi founded with a group of friends the "Kurdish Democratic Platform" (Turkish: Kürt Demokratik Platformu) in 1994, and served for its spokesman. The organization was engaged in forming the "Democratic Mass Party" (Turkish: Demokratik Kitle Partisi, which was established on 3 January 1997. Right after its foundation, he was elected leader of the political party. The party was banned by the Constitutional Court of Turkey (Turkish: Anayasa Mahkemesi on 26 February 1999. Elçi became leader of the "Participatory Democracy Party" (Turkish: Katılımcı Demokrasi Partisi) (KADEP), which was established on 19 December 2006.

Şerafettin Elçi entered the parliament again as an independent deputy from Diyarbakır Province following the general elections held on June 12, 2011. In the beginning of the parliamentary term, he refused to take the oath of office, which is required for all newly elected parliament members to take in a parliamentary session before taking office. He stated that "It is not possible to take the oath of office. It is prepared in a racist, fascist concept and in a Turkish chauvinist mentality. It is never an oath of office we can accept, appropriate and abide by our political struggle. We don't want to provoke a crisis. We will repeat the text, however we can not abide".

== Family life and death ==
Şerafttin Elçi died on 25 December 2012 at a hospital in Ankara, where he was treated for cancer. After a memorial before the parliament building, his corpse was taken firstly to Diyarbakır, and then was buried in Cizre in a religious funeral attended by thousands.

Şerafettin Elçi was survived by his wife Fatma Elçi and seven children. His daughter Evin married to the successful football manager Mustafa Denizli (born 1949) on July 28, 2010.

== Recognition ==
The airport in Sırnak is named after him.

== See also ==
- List of members of the Grand National Assembly of Turkey who died in office
