= Mahmut Cuhruk =

Turkish judge (1925–2018)

Mahmut Cuhruk (1925 – 8 October 2018) was a Turkish judge. He was president of the Constitutional Court of Turkey from 2 March 1988 until 1 March 1990.

Cuhruk was born in Yozgat in 1925. He died in Ankara on 8 October 2018.

Court offices
Preceded by Orhan Onar	President of the Constitutional Court of Turkey; 2 March 1988–1 March 1990	Succeeded by Necdet Darıcıoğlu
