= Özmert =

Özmert is a Turkish surname. Notable people with the surname include:

- Hakan Özmert (born 1985), French-Turkish footballer
- Semih Özmert (1921–2015), Turkish judge
