= Orhan Onar =

Turkish judge

Orhan Onar (1923 – 26 October 2009) was a Turkish judge.

Onar was born in Ankara. He served as President of the Constitutional Court of Turkey from 28 July 1986 until 1 March 1988.

Court offices
Preceded by Semih Özmert	President of the Constitutional Court of Turkey; 28 July 1986 – 1 March 1988	Succeeded by Mahmut Cuhruk
