= İbrahim Hilmi Senil =

Turkish judge

İbrahim Hilmi Senil (1903–1981) was a Turkish judge. He was president of the Constitutional Court of Turkey from July 8, 1966 until July 14, 1968.

Court offices
Preceded by Lütfi Akadlı	President of the Constitutional Court of Turkey; July 8, 1966–July 14, 1968	Succeeded by Hakkı Ketenoğlu
