= Ahmet Hamdi Boyacıoğlu =

Turkish judge

Ahmet Hamdi Boyacıoğlu (1920, Bolu – 23 August 1998) was a Turkish judge. He was president of the Constitutional Court of Turkey from 9 August 1982 until 6 April 1985, and was a member of the Grand National Assembly of Turkey.

Court offices
Preceded by Şevket Müftügil	President of the Constitutional Court of Turkey; 9 August 1982–6 April 1985	Succeeded by Semih Özmert
