= Atatürkist Thought Association =

Turkish secularist organization

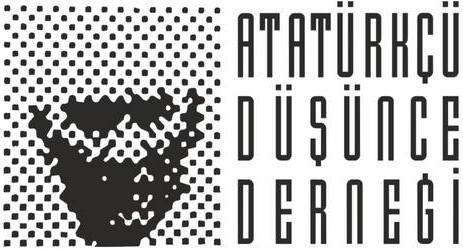
- Founded: 19 May 1989
- Founder: Muammer Aksoy, Bahriye Üçok
- Type: Non-profit organisation
- Headquarters: Çankaya, Ankara
- Members: 80,904
- Website: add.org.tr

The Atatürkist Thought Association (Turkish: Atatürkçü Düşünce Derneği, ADD) is a non-profit organisation that promotes Mustafa Kemal Atatürk's ideas, hence the Kemalism. It was founded in 1989 by a group of academics in response to "increasing attempts for a counter-revolution", as the constituting manifesto states.

The association is opposed to the Islamist tenets enacted by Ayatollah Ruhollah Khomeini in Iran and wants to ensure that religion and state remain separate in Turkey. It is credited with organising the 2007 Republic Protests.

People associated with ADD include mayor of Istanbul Ekrem İmamoğlu, former President of the Constitutional Court of Turkey Yekta Güngör Özden, former General Şener Eruygur (its head in 2009) and Tansel Çölaşan (its head since 2010).

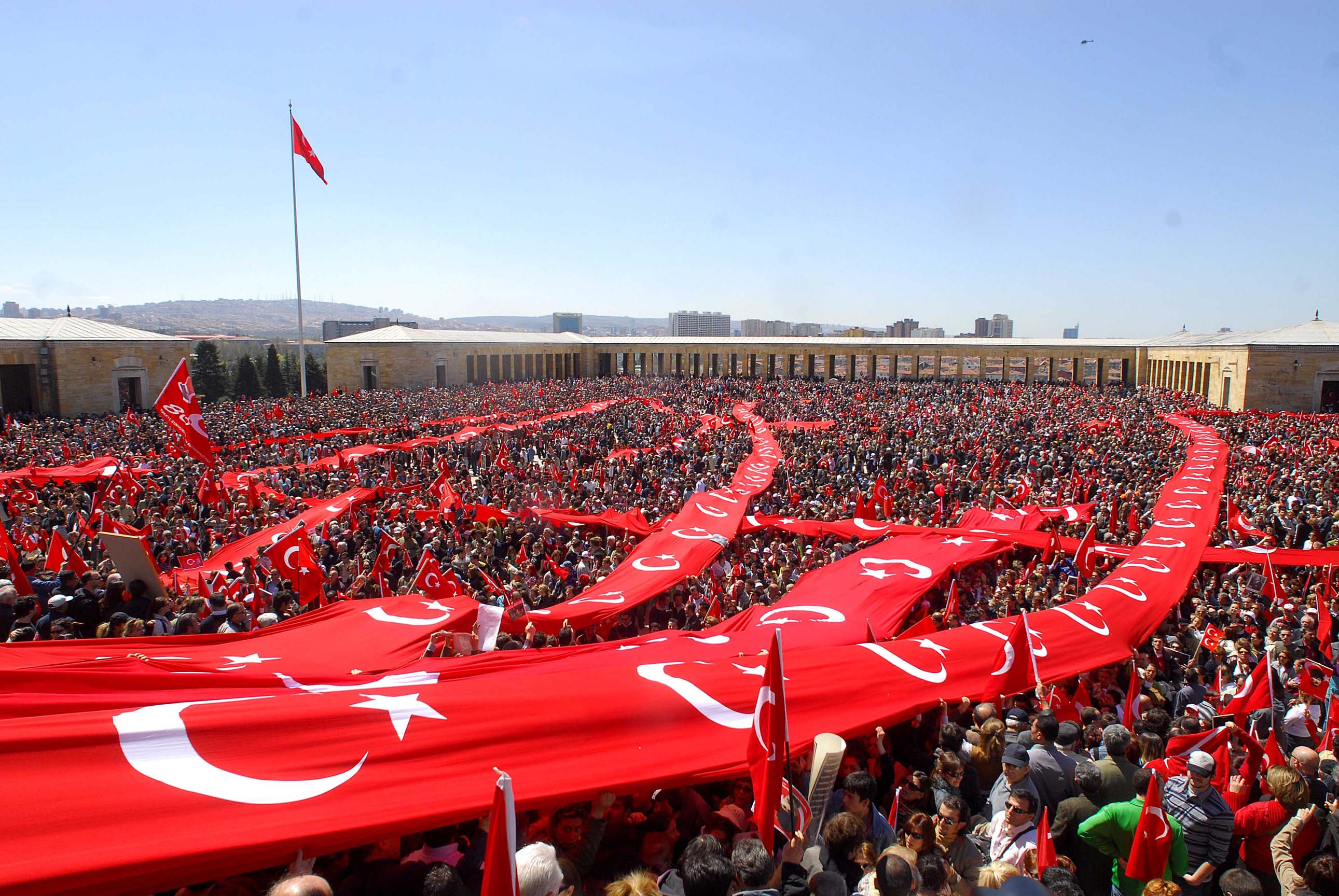
The Republic Protests held against the rise of Erdogan were organised by the ADD, rallying millions throughout the country.

== See also ==
- Secularism in Turkey
- Kemal Kerinçsiz
