= Mustafa Bumin =

Turkish judge (born 1940)

Mustafa Bumin (born 26 June 1940) is a former Turkish judge. He was president of the Constitutional Court of Turkey from 31 May 2000 until 24 June 2005. He was born in Mucur, Kırşehir Province.

Under his presidency of the Constitutional court the People's Democracy Party (HADEP) was closed down as the part was viewed to be a threat to the indivisibility of Turkey.

Court offices
Preceded by Ahmet Necdet Sezer	President of the Constitutional Court of Turkey; 31 May 2000–24 June 2005	Succeeded by Tülay Tuğcu
