= Lütfi Akadlı =

Turkish judge

Ömer Lütfi Akadlı

President of Turkish Constitutional Court
- In office 7 October 1964 – 8 July 1966
- Preceded by: Sünuhi Aslan
- Succeeded by: İbrahim Hilmi Senil

Personal details
- Born: 1902 Istanbul, Ottoman Empire
- Died: 31 May 1988 (aged 85–86)

Ömer Lütfi Akadlı (1902–1988) was a Turkish judge. He was the president of the Constitutional Court of Turkey from 7 October 1964 until 8 July 1966.

== Notes ==
Court offices
Preceded by Sünuhi Arsan	President of the Constitutional Court of Turkey; 7 October 1964–8 July 1966	Succeeded by İbrahim Senil
