= Necdet Darıcıoğlu =

Turkish judge

Necdet Darıcıoğlu (4 May 1926 – 14 September 2016) was a Turkish judge. He was born in Antalya. He was president of the Constitutional Court of Turkey from 2 March 1990 until 4 May 1991. He died in Ankara on 14 September 2016.

Court offices
| Preceded by Mahmut Cuhruk | President of the Constitutional Court of Turkey; 12 March 1990–4 May 1991 | Succeeded by Yekta Güngör Özden |
