= Kani Vrana =

Turkish judge

Kani Vrana (1913–1984) was a Turkish judge. He was president of the Constitutional Court of Turkey from 1 October 1975 until 13 July 1978. He was also president of the High Electoral Council between 1963 and 1970. He was born in Skopje, North Macedonia on 13 July 1913 and died on 17 June 1984.

Court offices
Preceded by Muhittin Taylan	President of the Constitutional Court of Turkey; 1 October 1975 – 13 July 1978	Succeeded by Şevket Müftügil
