= Çiğdem Toker =

Turkish investigative journalist

- Born: 1965 (age 60–61); Diyarbakır, Turkey
- Education: Ankara University, Law School
- Occupation: Investigative journalist
- Years active: 1986 – present
- Awards: Press Freedom Award

Çiğdem Toker (born 1965) is a Turkish investigative journalist. Her career as an economic reporter has notably included investigations of abuse of government contracts.

== Biography ==
Çiğdem Toker was born in 1965 in Diyarbakır, Turkey. After graduating from Ankara University, Law School, she became an investigative journalist.

Toker began her career in 1986, working for the culture section of the Anka News Agency. She then worked on dubbing films for the Turkish Radio and Television Corporation. After stints at the publications Günaydın and Nokta, she passed the exam to work at Anadolu Agency in 1988. She spent two years at Anadolu, covering the State Security Court and the Court of Cassation, the country's supreme court.

She then transitioned to covering economics, first for the weekly magazine Ekonomik Panorama from 1990 to 1993. Then for 15 years, from 1993 to 2008, she wrote on economics for the newspaper Hürriyet. Her tenure at the newspaper included covering the 2001 Turkish economic crisis.

On the foundation of the new newspaper Habertürk in 2009, Toker was hired as the publication's first Ankara bureau chief. However, she left shortly thereafter to serve as Ankara bureau chief at the newspaper Akşam. When the Savings Deposit Insurance Fund of Turkey took over the newspaper in 2013, Toker resigned from her role there.

From 2013 to 2018, she was a columnist for the newspaper Cumhuriyet, described as a "star investigative reporter" for the paper. In 2017, she wrote a series of articles revealing how the Turkish government removed regulations in order to give contracts for prison construction to companies close to the government. She resigned from the publication after a change in management.

Toker then wrote for the opposition newspaper Sözcü until 2022. She now reports for the online publication T24, which she had previously contributed to beginning in 2009. Among several court cases she has faced throughout her journalistic career, she was accused of defamation and sued for 80,000 Turkish lira for her 2019 reporting in Sözcü on foundations linked to the government and family of President Recep Tayyip Erdoğan. She had previously faced a 3 million lira fine for reporting on public sector contracts for Cumhuriyet. Toker has been sued by not only the government but also hospitals, agricultural firms, and mining companies.

In 2015, she was shortlisted for the European Press Prize for her work on uncovering mysterious expenditures under then-Prime Minister Ahmet Davutoğlu. In 2023, she was given the Turkish Journalists' Association's Press Freedom Award.

She has written or contributed to several books, including Abdüllatif Şener: Adım da Benimle Beraber Büyüdü (2008), a long interview with the politician Abdüllatif Şener; Türkiye'de Sağlıkta Kamu Özel Ortaklığı - Şehir Hastaneleri, compiled by Kayıhan Pala (2018); and the 2019 work Kamu ihalelerinde olağan işler, which builds on her reporting on government contracts.
