= Jülide Gülizar =

Turkish radio and TV news presenter

- Born: 1929; Adana, Turkey
- Died: 14 March 2011 (aged 82)
- Education: Ankara University, Law School
- Occupations: Journalist, anchorwoman

Jülide Gülizar (née Göksan; 8 April 1929 – 14 March 2011) was a Turkish anchorwoman and journalist. She was one of Turkey's first television anchors, as well as the first anchorwomen on the Turkish Radio and Television Corporation (TRT). Gülizar was the first anchorwoman to appear on television for TRT. She was a strong proponent of the use of standard Turkish in radio and television. She retired from TRT in 1982, but continued to work as a news presenter and teacher at other media organizations. Gülizar continued to produce and host her own television program until shortly before her death. She was also the author of several books, including Life, Thank You, One Subject, One Guest, Radios of Turkey Calling, and Where are you going Türkçe.

== Life ==
Jülide Gülizar was born in Adana, Turkey, on 8 April 1929. She was educated in Mersin, and then attended Ankara Girls High School. She graduated from Ankara University, Law School. Jülide Gülizar began her literary career with poetry (1950). While she was a sophomore, she published a monthly literary magazine called, With fifteen friends, including the poets Erdoğan Ünver and Hüseyin Yurdabak. Her poems were published in Bahçe magazine as well as in important literary magazines of the period such as Yedigün, Yücel, Başkent Ankara, Türk Dili, Varlık. In 1959, she collected her poems in the book Küçük Balıklar. She wrote her poems mostly in free verse. She married the poet Abdullah Rıza Ergüven, whom she met during her university years.

Gülizar began her broadcasting career on TRT radio in Ankara, Turkey, in 1956. She went on to become the first anchorwoman to appear on television for TRT. She was a strong proponent of the use of standard Turkish in radio and television. She retired from TRT in 1982, but continued to work as a news presenter and teacher at other media organizations. She worked at Cumhuriyet newspaper. Gülizar continued to produce and host her own television program until shortly before her death. She was also the author of several books, including Life, Thank You, One Subject, One Guest, Radios of Turkey Calling, and Where are you going Türkçe. Gülizar also taught at Başkent University Faculty of Communication, which was established in 1997, and was a board member of the Turkish Contemporary Journalists Association.

Gülizar died from pneumonia at Hacettepe University Medical Faculty Hospital in Ankara, Turkey, on 14 March 2011, at the age of 82. Following the religious funeral service at Kocatepe Mosque, she was laid to rest at the Karşıyaka Cemetery.
