= Akın İpek =

Turkish businessman (born 1963)

- Born: Hamdi Akın İpek; 29 December 1963 (age 62); Adana, Turkey
- Education: Harlaxton College, Hacettepe University
- Occupation: Businessman
- Employer: Koza İpek Holding
- Website: akinipek.co.uk/akin-ipek/

Hamdi Akın İpek (born 29 December 1963) is a Turkish businessman, the chairman of Koza İpek Holding, a Turkish conglomerate with interests in mining, media, aviation, agriculture, health and insurance. Since 2015 he has lived in the United Kingdom.

In October 2015, days before a general election, Turkish authorities seized the Koza İpek group, including its media outlets, over alleged links to the Gülen movement of Fethullah Gülen, whom the government accuses of orchestrating the 2016 coup attempt and designates a terrorist organisation ("FETÖ"). The takeover of the group's newspapers and television channels was condemned as a press-freedom violation by bodies including the OSCE Representative on Freedom of the Media, the Committee to Protect Journalists and the European Commission.

Turkey sought İpek's extradition from the United Kingdom on charges of terrorism financing, fraud and Gülen-movement membership. In November 2018 the Westminster Magistrates' Court refused the request, the district judge finding that the prosecution was politically motivated and that İpek faced a real risk of a breach of Article 3 of the European Convention on Human Rights if returned to Turkey; the High Court refused Turkey's appeal in April 2019, making the refusal final. Several of İpek's relatives have been imprisoned in Turkey over alleged Gülen links, and a related ICSID arbitration claim against Turkey was dismissed in 2022 on jurisdictional grounds without a ruling on the merits.

== Education ==
According to his company, in 1986 İpek received a MA from Harlaxton College, UK (British campus of the University of Evansville, Indiana, USA) and a bachelor's degree in business administration from Hacettepe University, Ankara, in 1990.

== Experience ==
Akın İpek is the Chairman of Koza İpek Holding, a Turkish conglomerate that spans different industries and sectors in Turkey and internationally. The group includes interests in the mining, media and print, aviation, agriculture, health and insurance sectors. Ipek sits on the board of all 22 companies in the Koza group, three of which are publicly traded.

Akın İpek began his career as a Marketing Manager in 1992 at Koza İpek Basın ve Basım San Tic. A.Ş., a printing business, where he has been president of the Board of Management since 2004.

He served as president of the Board of Directors of Koza Anadolu Metal Madencilik İşletmeleri A.Ş. and as chairman of Koza Altın İşletmeleri A.Ş. and İpek Doğal Enerji Kaynaklari Araştırma Ve Üretim A.Ş., three publicly traded companies on the Istanbul stock exchange with diverse interests in print, mining and energy.

Other notable positions held by Mr Ipek were the presidency of the board of ATP İnşaat Ve Tic A.S., a construction and commerce company; Koza Ipek Sigorta Aracılık Hizmetleri A.Ş., an insurance brokerage firm; and the chairmanship of ATP Havacılık Ticaret A.Ş., an aviation commerce company.

Akın İpek was chairman at Koza İpek Gazetecilik ve Yayıncılık A.Ş., the company that runs the Bugün and Millet newspapers and Bugün TV and Kanaltürk TV stations in Turkey.

Akın İpek is also a director of the English company Koza Limited, a subsidiary of Koza Altın İşletmeleri A.Ş., which has mining interests in Scotland, Northern Ireland and the Republic of Ireland.

== 2015 seizure of Koza İpek media ==
On 26 October 2015, days before Turkey's 1 November 2015 general election, an Ankara court ordered the seizure of the Koza İpek group and the appointment of a government-approved board of trustees over its 22 companies, as part of an investigation into alleged "terror financing" and "terror propaganda" linked to the movement of Fethullah Gülen. Trustees took over the companies on 27 October, and on 28 October police raided the group's Istanbul media headquarters, using tear gas and water cannon and breaking through the gates with chainsaws while the raid was broadcast live; about 19 people were detained. The affected outlets — the television channels Bugün TV and Kanaltürk and the daily newspapers Bugün and Millet, which had been critical of President Recep Tayyip Erdoğan — came under new pro-government management; Bugün and Millet published black front pages reading "A dark day for our democracy, for our freedom and for Turkey".

The seizure drew international press-freedom condemnation. The OSCE Representative on Freedom of the Media, Dunja Mijatović, called the police raid "a clear obstruction of media freedom" and urged that the channels be allowed to resume broadcasting. The Committee to Protect Journalists condemned the raids and called on Turkey "to immediately return Bugün TV, Kanaltürk TV, and the other Koza İpek media outlets to their rightful management". In a written question to the European Commission, members of the European Parliament described the takeover of the holding's 22 companies as a media-freedom concern; the Commission, answering through Commissioner Johannes Hahn, said it was following "worrying developments" regarding media freedom in Turkey "and in particular the seizure of Koza İpek Holding", and that Turkey as a candidate country had to respect the rule of law, freedom of expression and media freedom. Earlier, after Turkish financial-crimes investigators searched Koza İpek businesses on 1 September 2015, the US State Department spokesman Mark Toner had urged Turkish authorities to uphold "universal democratic values, including due process, freedom of expression as well as access to media and information".

== Extradition proceedings in the United Kingdom ==
İpek, who had moved to the United Kingdom in 2015, was arrested by British police in May 2018 on a Turkish extradition request that alleged terrorism financing, fraud and membership of the Gülen movement (which Turkey designates "FETÖ"); he was released subject to conditions pending an extradition hearing. On 28 November 2018, Westminster Magistrates' Court (District Judge John Zani), ruling also on co-defendants Ali Çelik and Talip Büyük, refused the request. The judge stated that he was "satisfied that this is a politically motivated prosecution", and found that, because of the defendants' actual or perceived political views and the Turkish authorities' assertion that they belonged to the Gülen movement, each faced "a real risk" of a breach of Article 3 of the European Convention on Human Rights (the prohibition of torture and of inhuman or degrading treatment) if returned to Turkey. Turkey's then justice minister, Abdulhamit Gül, called the decision "unacceptable" and said Ankara would appeal. The High Court refused Turkey permission to appeal, and on 9 April 2019 Mrs Justice Elisabeth Laing refused Turkey's renewed application — "I refuse this renewed application for permission to appeal" — exhausting Turkey's avenue of appeal and making the UK's refusal of extradition final.

== ICSID arbitration ==
A company associated with İpek, Ipek Investment Limited (incorporated in the United Kingdom), brought arbitration proceedings against Turkey at the International Centre for Settlement of Investment Disputes (ICSID) under the United Kingdom–Turkey bilateral investment treaty, alleging unlawful expropriation arising from the 2015 seizure of the Koza İpek companies; press reports put the claim at about US$7 billion. In an award dated 8 December 2022 (ICSID Case No. ARB/18/18), the tribunal dismissed the claim as inadmissible on jurisdictional grounds, finding it an abuse of process for the İpek family, all Turkish nationals, to restructure their shareholding through a UK company so as to obtain treaty protection when the dispute was already "reasonably foreseeable". The tribunal did not rule on the merits of whether the seizure was lawful, expressly stating that the award "is in no sense a vindication of the Respondent's position on the merits"; it ordered each side to bear its own costs and to share the tribunal's fees equally.

== Family prosecutions and pending ECtHR case ==
Members of İpek's family have been prosecuted in Turkey over alleged Gülen links. His brother, Cafer Tekin İpek, was sentenced by an Ankara court to 79 years and 8 months' imprisonment for membership of a terrorist organisation and tax-related offences and has been held, initially in pre-trial detention, since April 2016; the sentence was upheld on appeal in 2021. His mother, Melek İpek, then aged 78 and reported to be in poor health, was imprisoned in Ankara's Sincan Prison on 9 November 2024 to serve sentences of six years and three months for membership of a terrorist organisation and four years and two months for violating capital-markets regulations. The Stockholm Center for Freedom, an advocacy organisation, has characterised the prosecution of İpek's relatives as a form of collective or "family" punishment of dissidents' relatives. In January 2025, the European Parliament's rapporteur on Turkey, Nacho Sánchez Amor, publicly questioned a "strange delay" in a European Court of Human Rights case—an application filed by Cafer Tekin İpek in 2016 over his detention and still pending—connected to the Koza İpek seizure.

== Charity ==
Akın İpek was a founder of the Koza İpek Educational, Health Services and Charity Foundation, which helped to establish İpek University in Ankara.
