= Participatory Democracy Party =

Participatory Democracy Party Kurdish: Turkish: Katılımcı Demokrasi Partisi, KADEP
- Leader: Lütfi Baksi
- Founder: Şerafettin Elçi
- Founded: 19 December 2006
- Dissolved: 27 May 2019
- Split from: Democratic People's Party
- Merged into: Turkey Kurdistan Democratic Party
- Ideology: Social democracy Kurdish nationalism
- Political position: Centre-left

Participatory Democracy Party (Turkish: Katılımcı Demokrasi Partisi, KADEP) was a pro-Kurdish rights party in Turkey. The party was created in 2006 by Şerafettin Elçi, the former Minister of Public Works.

In the 2011 Turkish general election, Elçi ran with the Labour, Democracy and Freedom Bloc; it was elected in the Diyarbakır Province.

On May 27 2019, the party merged into the Turkey Kurdistan Democratic Party.

== See also ==
- Racism in Turkey
- Kurds in Turkey
- Human rights of Kurdish people in Turkey
