= Kadir Özkaya =

19th President of the Constitutional Court of Turkey

President of the Constitutional Court of Turkey
- Incumbent
- Assumed office 20 April 2024
- Preceded by: Zühtü Arslan

Personal details
- Born: 12 August 1963 (age 63) Tarsus, Mersin, Turkey
- Children: 2
- Education: Gazi University

Kadir Özkaya (born 12 August 1963) is a Turkish jurist who has served on the Constitutional Court of Turkey since 2014, and as its president since 2024. Prior to his tenure on the Constitutional Court, he was a member of the Council of State.

== Early life ==
Kadir Özkaya was born in Tarsus, Mersin, Turkey, in 1963. He attended the Bandırma Secondary School and Land Registry and Cadastre Vocational High School. He graduated from Gazi University in 1985. He graduated from the Turkish and Middle East Public Administration Institute's public administration specialization program in 2002.

== Career ==
Özkaya was a civil servant in the General Directorate of Land Registry and Cadastre.

Özkaya started his administrative judicial internship on 4 February 1991. He was appointed as a research judge at the Council of State on 13 May 1993, after completing his internship, and held the position until 2004. On 21 October 2005, he was appointed as a rapporteur at the Constitutional Court of Turkey.

Özkaya was elected to the Council of State in 2011. He was selected as a member of the Constitutional Court by President Recep Tayyip Erdoğan among the three candidates nominated by the General Assembly of the Council of State on 18 December 2014. He was elected deputy president of the Constitutional Court on 12 March 2020, and 5 March 2024. He was elected to succeed Zühtü Arslan as the president of the Constitutional Court on 21 March 2024, and officially began his duty on 20 April.

== Personal life ==
Özkaya is married and is the father of two children.

Legal offices
Preceded by Zühtü Arslan	President of the Constitutional Court of Turkey; 20 April 2024 – incumbent	Succeeded by incumbent
