= List of presidents of the Constitutional Court of Turkey =

Presidents of the Constitutional Court of Turkey
- Incumbent; Kadir Özkaya since 20 April 2024
- Appointer: Constitutional Court of Turkey
- Inaugural holder: Sünuhi Arsan
- Formation: Turkish Constitution of 1961
- Website: anayasa.gov.tr

This is a chronological list of presidents of the Constitutional Court of Turkey since the establishment of the institution in 1962.

No.	Name	Took office	Left office
1	Sünuhi Arsan	June 22, 1962	July 13, 1964
2	Lütfi Akadlı	October 7, 1964	July 8, 1966
3	İbrahim Senil	July 8, 1966	July 14, 1968
4	Hakkı Ketenoğlu	December 15, 1970	July 14, 1971
5	Muhittin Taylan	July 14, 1971	July 13, 1975
6	Kani Vrana	October 1, 1975	July 13, 1978
7	Şevket Müftügil	October 24, 1978	August 7, 1982
8	Ahmet Hamdi Boyacıoğlu	August 9, 1982	April 6, 1985
9	Semih Özmert	April 9, 1985	July 27, 1986
10	Orhan Onar	July 28, 1986	March 1, 1988
11	Mahmut Cuhruk	March 2, 1988	March 1, 1990
12	Necdet Darıcıoğlu	March 2, 1990	May 4, 1991
13	Yekta Güngör Özden	May 8, 1991	January 1, 1998
14	Ahmet Necdet Sezer	January 6, 1998	May 4, 2000
15	Mustafa Bumin	May 31, 2000	June 24, 2005
16	Tülay Tuğcu	June 25, 2005	June 12, 2007
17	Haşim Kılıç	October 22, 2007	February 10, 2015
18	Zühtü Arslan	February 10, 2015	April 20, 2024
19	Kadir Özkaya	April 20, 2024	Incumbent

== See also ==
- Judicial system of Turkey

== Sources ==
- Constitution of Turkey Web site (in Turkish)
