= New Party (Turkey, 2008) =

New Party Yeni Parti
- Leader: Sumru Tömek
- Founder: Alper Tunga Aytaş; Mehmet Ali Türk
- Founded: 23 June 2008
- Dissolved: 20 May 2012
- Succeeded by: Rights and Equality Party
- Ideology: Kemalism; Ulusalism
- Political position: Centre-left
- Colours: Red

Website
- www.yeniparti.org.tr (archived)

The New Party (Turkish: Yeni Parti, YP) is a former political party in Turkey that was founded on 23 June 2008. Adhering to the principles of Kemalism, the party merged with the Rights and Equality Party (HEPAR) in 2012 without contesting any elections. Former leaders include Tuncay Özkan, who led the party despite being imprisoned following the Ergenekon trials. The party's colours were primarily red, and the party logo was that of the Sun.
