= Sünuhi Arsan =

Turkish judge

1st President of the Constitutional Court of Turkey
- In office 22 June 1962 – 13 July 1964
- Succeeded by: Ömer Lütfi Akadlı

Personal details
- Born: 1899 Istanbul, Turkey
- Died: 29 May 1970 (aged 70–71)

Sünuhi Arsan (1899 – 1970) was a Turkish judge. He was the first president of the Constitutional Court of Turkey from 22 June 1962 until 13 July 1964.

Court offices
Preceded by new established	President of the Constitutional Court of Turkey; 22 June 1962–13 July 1964	Succeeded by Lütfi Akadlı
