= Semih Özmert =

Turkish judge

Hasan Semih Özmert (27 July 1921 in Üsküdar, Istanbul – 3 November 2015) was a Turkish judge who served as the president of the Constitutional Court of Turkey from 9 April 1985 to 27 July 1986.

Court offices
Preceded by Ahmet Hamdi Boyacıoğlu	President of the Constitutional Court of Turkey; 9 April 1985–27 July 1986	Succeeded by Orhan Onar
