= Tuncay Özkan =

Turkish politician (born 1966)

Tuncay Özkan MP
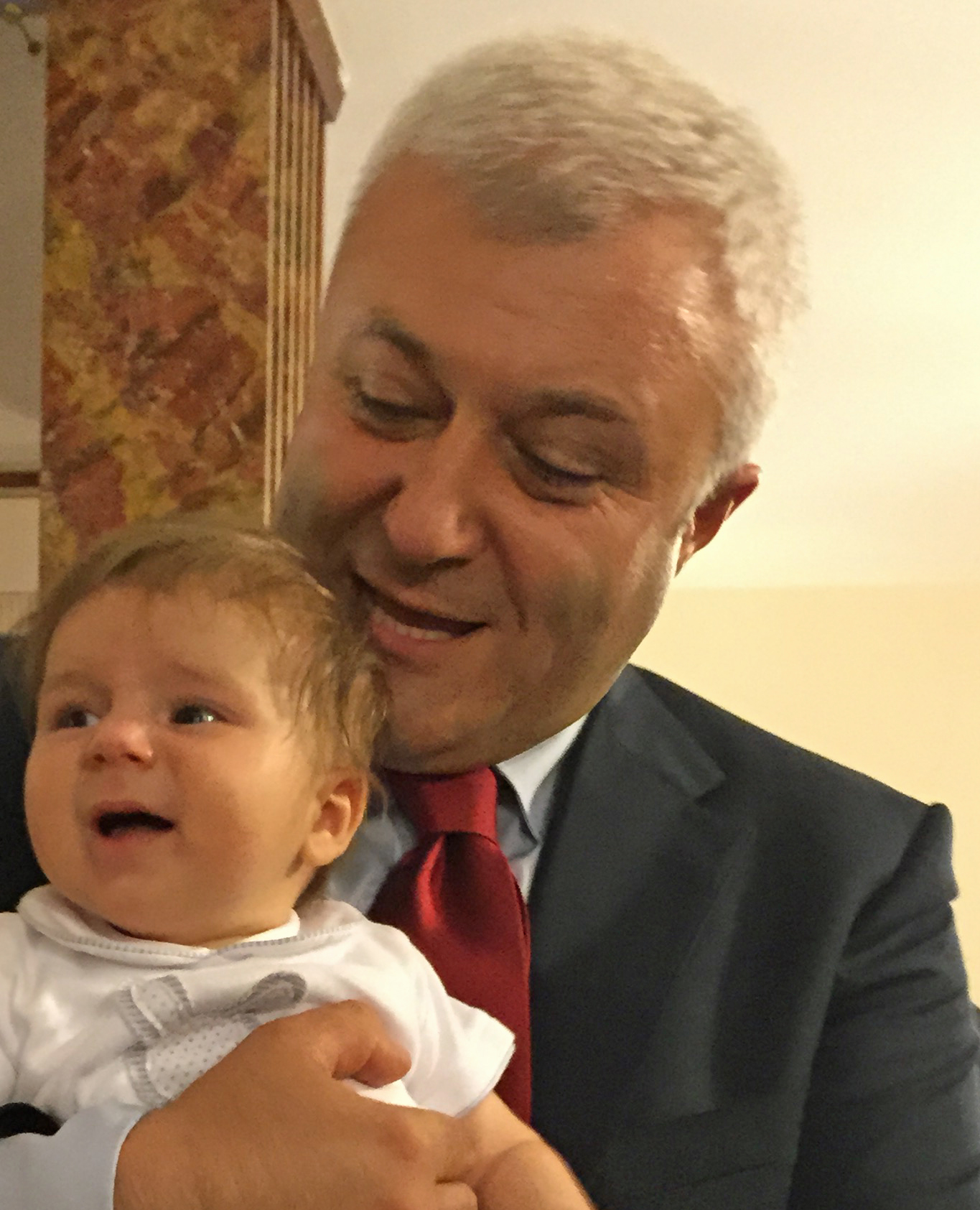
- Özkan with his baby son at the state opening of Parliament on 23 June 2015.

Member of the Grand National Assembly
- Incumbent
- Assumed office 7 June 2015
- Constituency: İzmir (I) (June 2015, Nov 2015, 2018, 2023)

Leader of the New Party
- In office 28 December 2008 – 26 June 2011
- Preceded by: Party established
- Succeeded by: Sumru Tömek

Personal details
- Born: Ahmet Tuncay Özkan; 14 August 1966 (age 60) Ankara, Turkey
- Party: New Party (2008-2011); Republican People's Party (CHP) (2014-2026); New Party (2026-present)
- Children: 2
- Education: Gazi University
- Occupation: Journalist, writer, politician
- Website: Personal website

Ahmet Tuncay Özkan (born 14 August 1966) is a Turkish journalist, writer and politician. He was arrested on September 27, 2008, in relation to the odatv case of the Ergenekon trials, and in August 2013 he was sentenced to aggravated life imprisonment and released a year later.

== Career ==
Tuncay Özkan began his career in journalism in 1981 as a local reporter in Ankara. Three years later, he was hired by Hürün newspaper published by the group Hürriyet. From 1988 to 1993, Tuncay Özkan worked for the Kemalist daily Cumhuriyet and then moved to the popular private television channel called Show TV to work as a correspondent in Ankara for their political show Arena. In 1995, he started with another private channel Kanal D where he worked as the general news manager (1996-2002).

In June 2002, he went back to Show TV to work as general news manager. In June 2002, he was appointed as the CEO of Çukurova Media Group, a position he left in December 2003 to create his own television channel called Kanaltürk. On May 13, 2008, he sold this Kanaltürk with all its related side companies to Akın İpek, CEO of Koza Madencilik A.Ş. In September 2008, Tuncay Özkan founded a new television channel called Kanal Biz which was forced to close one year later due to financial difficulties at the time. Tuncay Özkan also worked for many years as a columnist for several Turkish national newspapers (Radikal, Milliyet and Akşam).

== Political career ==
As one of the founding fathers of the Republic Protests, Tuncay Özkan launched a political civic movement called Biz Kaç Kişiyiz (How many of us is there?) on September 12, 2007. In just seven months, this movement managed to gather over 1.3 million citizens, according to the official website, to protest against the Turkish government controlled by the conservative Islamist AKP. On June 23, 2008, Tuncay Özkan was elected as the chairman of the Kemalist Yeni Parti (New Party) and, following his arrest in September 2008, the party replaced him to this position before merging with another political party named HEPAR.

== Ergenekon Case ==
Tuncay Özkan was put in prison on September 27, 2008 as an Ergenekon suspect. According to the prosecution, he was a member of the terrorist organization which was allegedly preparing a Turkish secularist military coup against the Turkish government. Tuncay Özkan served his sentence at the Silivri Prison (80 km outside Istanbul). He was sharing a cell with the arrested journalist and Turkish MP Mustafa Balbay since October 2012.

An appeal to the ECHR was turned down in early 2012.

On 5 August 2013 Özkan was sentenced to aggravated life imprisonment.

He was released on 10 March 2014.

== Bibliography ==
- Ötekiler (2013)
- Anne Canım Hiç Acımadı (2012)
- Hapiste Yatacak Olanlara Öğütler (2011)
- Zorbalığın Pençesinde
- Bir Casusun İftiraları / Tuncay Güney Hakkında Her Şey (2009)
- Danıştay Cinayeti Cumhuriyet'e Saldırı (2009)
- Yaraya Tuz Bastım 'Ermeni Soykırımı...' (2007)
- Abdullah Öcalan Neden Verildi? Nasıl Yakalandı? Ne Olacak? (2005)
- CIA Kürtleri-Kürt Devletinin Gizli Tarihi (2004)
- Milli İstihbarat Teşkilatı-MİT’in Gizli Tarihi (2003)
- Bush ve Saddam'ın Gölgesinde Entrikalar Savaşı (2003)
- Operasyon (2000)
- Parsadan Hikayesi (1996)
- Bir Gizli Servisin Tarihi (1996)
- Suikast Raporu 93/96 (1996)
- Öldürün O Gazeteciyi (1994)
- Kıyamet Mahkemesi (1993)

== See also ==
- List of arrested journalists in Turkey
