= Ankara University, Law School =

Faculty for law of the Ankara University in Turkey

Ankara University, School of Law
- Ankara Üniversitesi Hukuk Fakültesi
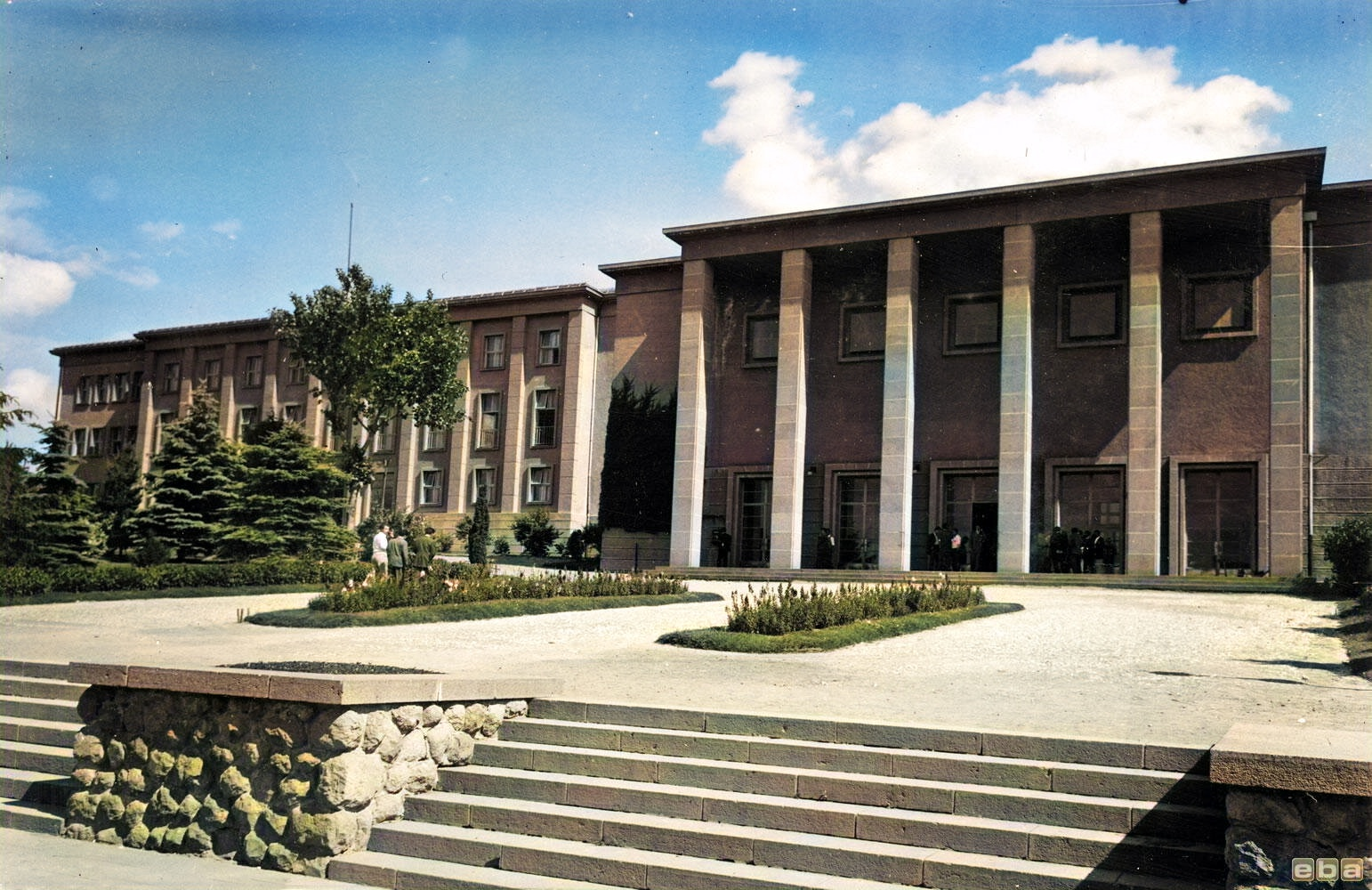
- Entrance of the Ankara University, Law School
- Former names: Ankara Hukuk Mektebi
- Type: Public
- Established: November 5, 1925; 100 years ago
- Founders: Mustafa Kemal Atatürk
- Parent institution: Ankara University
- Dean: Prof. Dr. Muharrem Özen
- Location: Ankara, Turkey; 39.92906°N 32.87182°E
- Campus: Urban
- Website: law.ankara.edu.tr

The Ankara University, Law School (Turkish: Ankara Üniversitesi Hukuk Fakültesi formerly known Ankara Adliye Hukuk Mektebi or AUHF) is the faculty of law at Ankara University in Turkey.

== History ==
Ankara University, Law School was established as part of Turkey's legal reforms, spearheaded by Mahmut Esat Bozkurt. The school was inaugurated by Mustafa Kemal Atatürk, the founder of the Turkish Republic, on November 5, 1925. It was the first university-level higher education institution of the newly founded Republic, and its first cohort of students graduated in 1928.

During the opening ceremony, Atatürk expressed his profound sentiment, stating, "For no other institution do I feel such felicity as I feel for this institution, which will be the warranty of the Republic, and I am glad to reveal and open it."

== Notable alumni ==
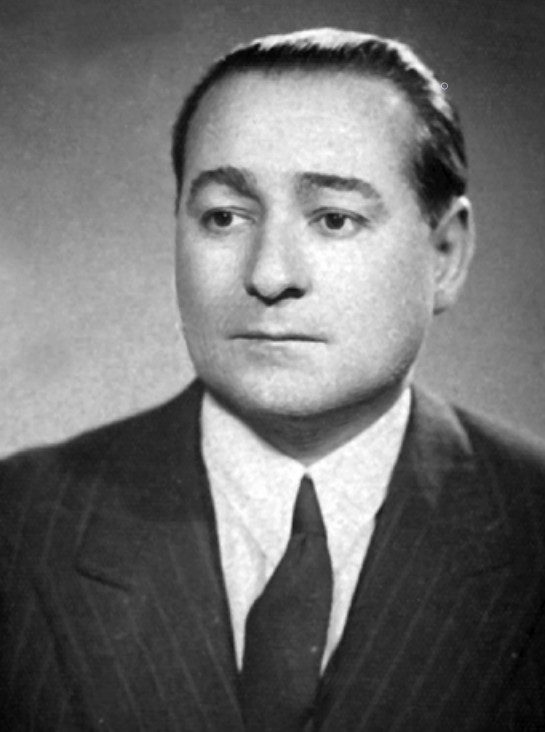
Adnan Menderes, Prime Minister of Turkey (1950–1960)

- Ahmet Necdet Sezer – Former President of Turkey
- Adnan Menderes – Former Prime Minister of Turkey
- Bülent Arınç – Former speaker of the Turkish parliament (2002-2007)
- Kemal Güven – Former speaker of the Turkish parliament (1973-1977)
- Tülay Tuğcu – Former president of the Constitutional Court of Turkey
- Deniz Baykal – Politician and former leader of the Republican People's Party
- Uğur Mumcu – Investigative journalist for daily Cumhuriyet
- Turgut Özakman – Turkish author
- Emine Ülker Tarhan – Turkish former judge and politician
- Jülide Gülizar – First anchorwoman of Turkey
- Şerafettin Elçi – Former Minister of Public Works
- Selahattin Demirtaş – Co-leader of the left-wing pro-Kurdish Peoples' Democratic Party
- Kemal Burkay – Politician and writer
- Çetin Altan – Journalist
- Ece Temelkuran – Columnist and writer
- Doğu Perinçek – Turkish politician
- Çiğdem Toker – investigative journalist
- Kamil Tolon – Turkish industrialist

== See also ==
- Ankara University
- Faculty of Political Science, Ankara University
