= Haşim Kılıç =

President of the Constitutional Court of Turkey from 2007 to 2015

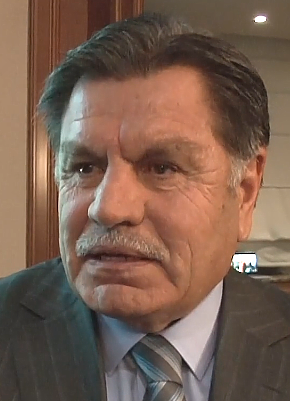

President of the Constitutional Court of Turkey
- In office 22 October 2007 – 10 February 2015
- Preceded by: Tülay Tuğcu
- Succeeded by: Zühtü Arslan

Vice President of the Constitutional Court
- In office 7 December 1999 – 22 October 2007
- Succeeded by: Osman Alifeyyaz Aksüt

Personal details
- Born: 13 March 1950 (age 76) Çiçekdağı, Kırşehir, Turkey

Haşim Kılıç (pronounced [haʃim ˈkɯɫɯtʃ]; born 13 March 1950, in Çiçekdağı, Kırşehir) is a Turkish former high-ranking judge, who served as President of the Constitutional Court of Turkey from 22 October 2007 until 10 February 2015.

== Biography ==
Kılıç was born in Hacı Hasanlı village of Çiçekdağı district of the Kırşehir Province in Turkey. In 1968, he attended Eskişehir Academy of Economics and Commerce and graduated in 1972. Between 1974 and 1985, he served as a financial auditor at the Court of Auditors of Turkey, which is a high judicial body according to the Constitution of Turkey. He was elected as a member of the Board of the Court of Auditors of Turkey, a position he held five years long.

On 7 December 1990, he was appointed as a judge of the Constitutional Court by Turkish President Turgut Özal. On 7 December 1999 and 7 December 2003, he was elected twice as the deputy president of the court. On 10 February 2015 he announced his retirement, a month ahead of schedule, after a series of public confrontations between himself and top government officials. He was succeeded by Zühtü Arslan.

He is married to Gönül Kılıç. The couple has four children.

Legal offices
| Preceded by Tülay Tuğcu | President of the Constitutional Court of Turkey; 22 October 2007 - 10 February 2015 | Succeeded by Zühtü Arslan |
