= Ahmet Necdet Sezer =

President of Turkey from 2000 to 2007

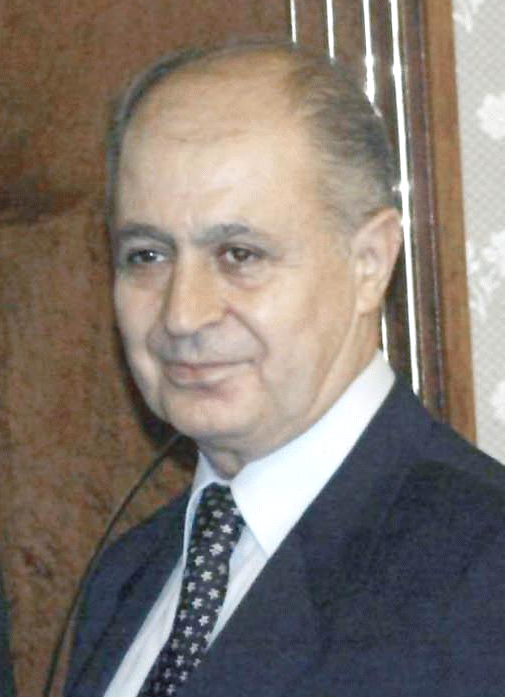
- Sezer in 2004

10th President of Turkey
- In office 16 May 2000 – 28 August 2007
- Prime Minister: Bülent Ecevit; Abdullah Gül; Recep Tayyip Erdoğan
- Preceded by: Süleyman Demirel
- Succeeded by: Abdullah Gül

President of the Constitutional Court
- In office 6 January 1998 – 4 May 2000
- Preceded by: Yekta Güngör Özden
- Succeeded by: Mustafa Bumin

Personal details
- Born: 13 September 1941 (age 85) Afyonkarahisar, Turkey
- Party: Independent
- Spouse: Semra Kürümoğlu (m. 1964)
- Children: 3
- Education: Ankara University, Law School
- Profession: Judge

Ahmet Necdet Sezer (Note: Turkish pronunciation: [ahˈmed nedʒˈdet seˈzæɾ]) (born 13 September 1941) is a Turkish statesman and judge who served as the president of Turkey from 2000 to 2007. Previously, he was president of the Constitutional Court of Turkey from January 1998 to May 2000. The Grand National Assembly of Turkey elected Sezer as president in 2000 after Süleyman Demirel's seven-year term expired. He was succeeded by Abdullah Gül in 2007.

Following his legal career, Sezer became a candidate for the presidency with the joint support of many political parties in Parliament. Following the 2000 presidential election, he took an ardent secularist approach on issues such as the headscarf, holding the view that secularism in Turkey was under threat. A quarrel between Sezer and Prime Minister Bülent Ecevit in 2001 led to a financial meltdown, attributed to the weakness of the coalition government as well as to the large debt owed to the International Monetary Fund.

The landslide victory of the conservative Islamist Justice and Development Party (AKP) in the 2002 general election led to strong opposition from President Sezer, who vetoed several proposed laws and referred others to the Constitutional Court. These included laws on banking reform and the lifting of the political ban on Recep Tayyip Erdoğan. During receptions at the presidential palace, Sezer refused to allow women wearing the headscarf to attend citing the laws on the separation of religion and state at the time; this resulted in the wives of Abdullah Gül and Erdoğan, Hayrünnisa Gül and Emine Erdoğan respectively, being barred from attendance. Erdoğan later said in public that he had 'suffered a lot' from Sezer.

== Early life ==
Sezer was born in 1941 in Afyonkarahisar to Ahmet Hamdi Sezer and Hatice Sezer, Macedonian Turkish Muhacir parents who emigrated from Serres, Central Macedonia, Greece during the population exchange between Greece and Turkey following the Turkish War of Independence.

After finishing Afyonkarahisar High School in 1958, he graduated from the Ankara University Faculty of Law in 1962 and began his career as a judge in Ankara. Following his military service as reserve officer at the Military Academy, he served first as a judge in Dicle and Yerköy, and then became a supervisory judge in the High Court of Appeals in Ankara.

He married Semra Hanim in 1964 and they had three children.

In 1978, he received an LL.M. in civil law from the Faculty of Law in Ankara University.

== Judicial career and appointment as chief justice ==
On 8 March 1983, Sezer was elected as a member of the High Court of Appeals. As a member of the Second Chamber of Law, he was nominated by the plenary assembly of the High Court of Appeals as one of the three candidates for appointment as member of the Constitutional Court. Five years later on 26 September 1988, he was appointed as a member of the Constitutional Court by President Kenan Evren and was reappointed for another five years in 1993 by Presidents Turgut Özal (who nominated him) and Süleyman Demirel (who confirmed his position, since the latter died in office).

On 6 January 1998, Ahmet Necdet Sezer was elected as chief justice of the Constitutional Court and served until his resignation in 2000, when he was elected as president.

== Presidency (2000–2007) ==
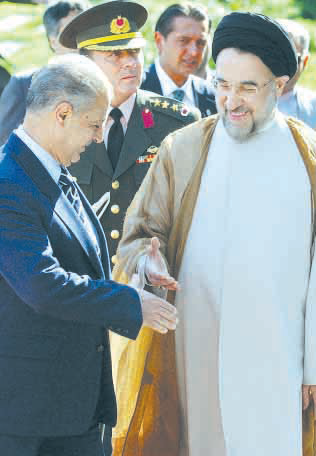
In Tehran with Mohammad Khatami

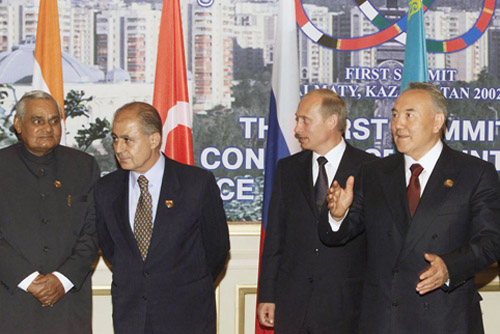
Sezer with Vladimir Putin, Atal Bihari Vajpayee and Nursultan Nazarbayev

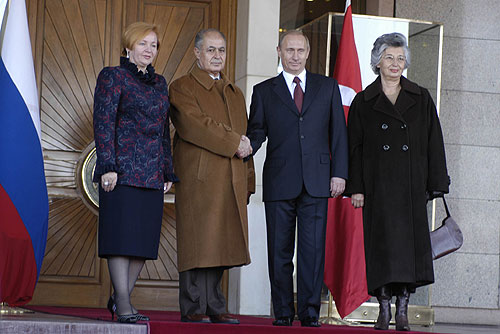
Sezer and his spouse (far right) with Vladimir Putin and his spouse

He was elected president and sworn in on 16 May 2000, becoming Turkey's first head of state to come from a judicial background. His term was due to expire on 16 May 2007, but because the Grand National Assembly of Turkey had failed to elect a new president, he retained the office pro tempore until 28 August 2007 (the Constitution of Turkey states that a president's term of office is extended until a successor is elected).

On 21 February 2001, during a quarrel in a National Security Council meeting, he threw the constitutional code book at Prime Minister Bülent Ecevit. Some cite this falling-out as the main reason for what became known as 'Black Wednesday', a huge economic crisis. Others claimed that the rapid reforms called for by the accession negotiations with the European Union and Turkey's strong ties with the International Monetary Fund caused the crisis.

Sezer was a firm defender of secularism in Turkey, a frequent point of contention between him and the ruling AKP party. On many occasions, he openly claimed that Turkey's secular regime was under threat. Since he believes that Islam does not require women to wear headscarves, Sezer excluded legislators' wives who wore headscarves from official receptions at the Presidential Palace.

During his presidency, he pardoned 260 convicted felons, 202 of whom were captured leftist militants. (This type of pardon can be requested directly by the felon or the legal representative of the felon, but no political or court referral is necessary.) Some organisations have cited such pardons to criticise Sezer's presidency. On the other hand, Sezer also enacted harsher laws to punish people connected with terrorism.

== Post-presidency ==
During the 2014 presidential election, won by Erdoğan, Sezer openly refused to vote, citing the lack of a secularist candidate as his reason.

Sezer endorsed Kemal Kılıçdaroğlu's candidacy in the 2023 presidential election.

== Awards and orders ==
Ribbon	Award and order	Country	Date	City	Note	Source
	Order of the Cross of Terra Mariana	Estonia	18 April 2002	Tallinn	The Terra Mariana Engagement is one of the highest marks given by the Estonian President.	

Legal offices
Preceded by Yekta Güngör Özden	President of the Constitutional Court; 1998–2000	Succeeded by Mustafa Bumin
Political offices
Preceded by Süleyman Demirel	President of Turkey; 2000–2007	Succeeded by Abdullah Gül
