= Kanaltürk =

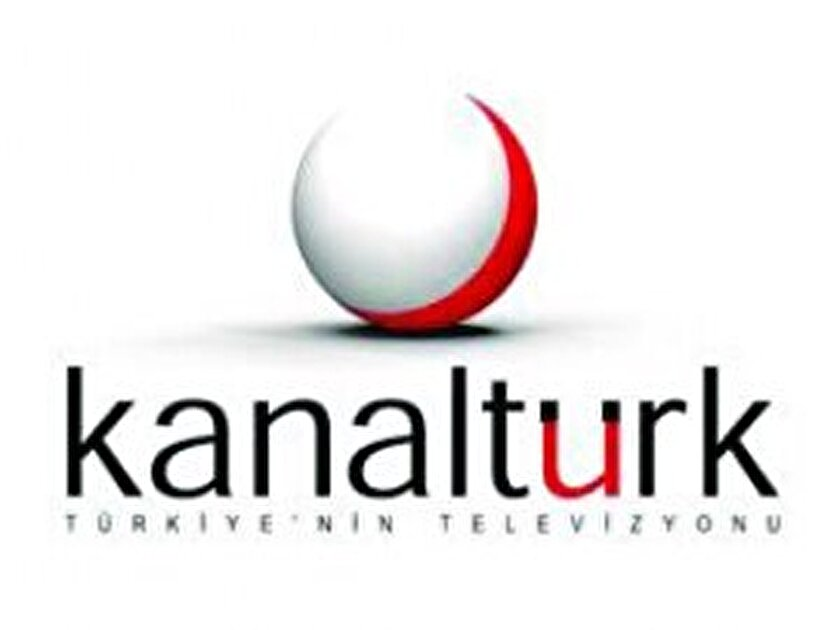
- Country: Turkey
- Affiliates: Kanaltürk Radyo
- Headquarters: Istanbul

Programming
- Language: Turkish
- Picture format: 16:9 (576i, SDTV)

Ownership
- Owner: Koza İpek Holding
- Sister channels: Bugün Daily, Bugün TV, Kanaltürk Radio, Millet Daily

History
- Launched: 10 June 2004; 21 years ago
- Closed: 29 February 2016; 9 years ago

Kanaltürk was a TV channel in Turkey.

Founded by Tuncay Özkan in 2004, it was sold by Özkan in May 2008 to Koza İpek Holding. The channel was closed on 29 February 2016, along with Bugün TV and İpek Media Group. The channel is known for its closeness to Fethullah Gülen, the leader of the Gülen movement.

== History ==
In 2008, the company had been in financial difficulties, with tax debts of as much as $10m, and many employees not paid over the preceding seven months.

On October 27, 2015, Turkish police storm and shut down both Kanaltürk TV station and Bugün TV station that have been critical of the ruling Justice and Development Party (AKP) ahead of a general election on November 1. Baris Yarkadas, a lawmaker with the main-opposition Republican People's Party (CHP), said “We are witnessing the police entering news organizations, delivering declarations and taking over journalists’ seats—just like junta periods, this is called a police state". And now October 28, Wednesday off the air 16:37 (TSİ) 15:37 (GMT+1) alongside channel Kanaltürk, Bugün TV and Kanaltürk Radio has been interrupted.
