= Constitutional Court of Turkey =

Highest legal body for constitutional review in Turkey

Constitutional Court
- Anayasa Mahkemesi

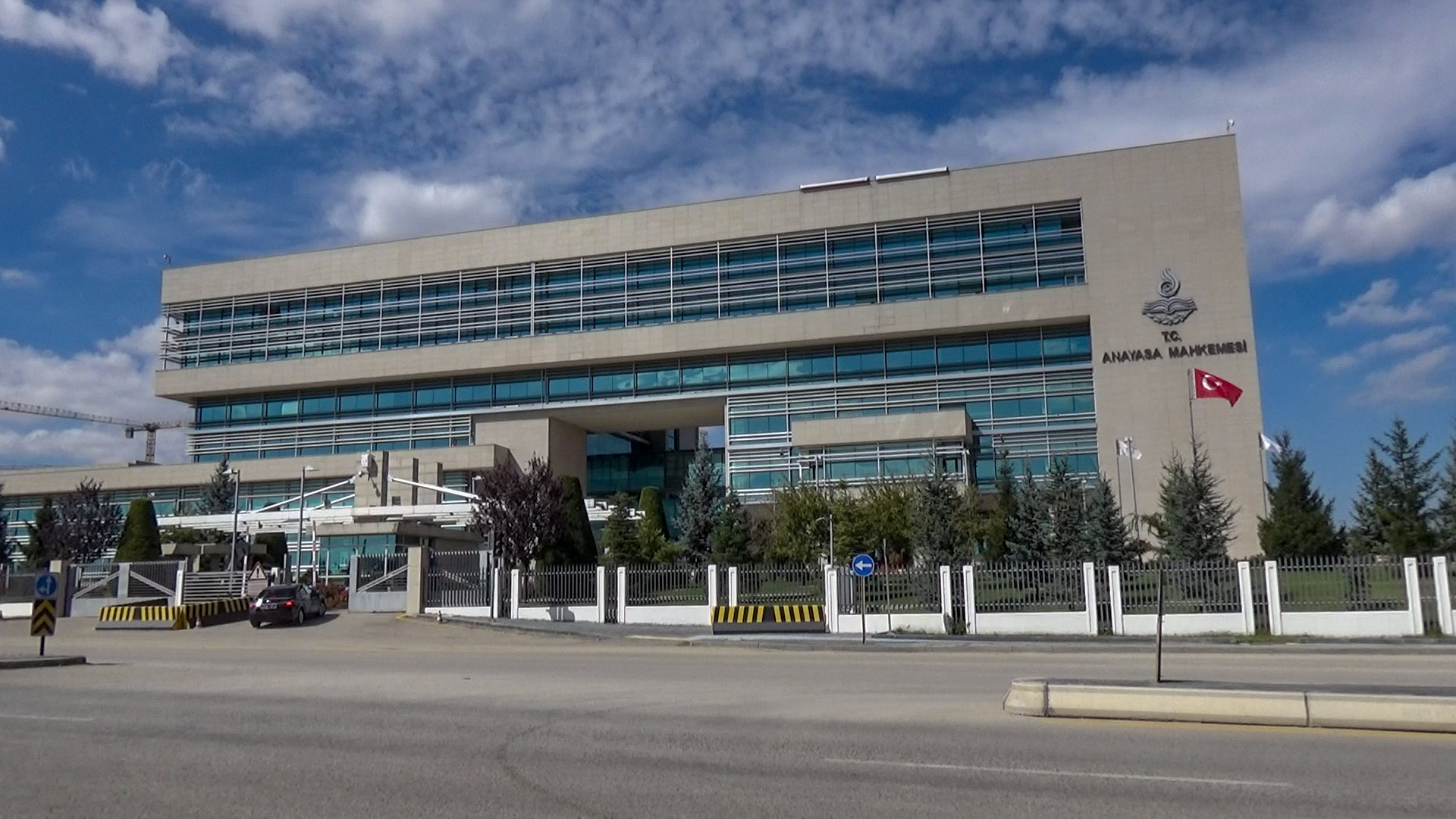
- Constitutional Court building in Ankara
- Interactive map of Constitutional Court
- 39°50′42″N 32°47′24″E
- Established: 25 April 1962
- Location: Ahlatlıbel, Çankaya, Ankara
- Coordinates: 39°50′42″N 32°47′24″E
- Motto: "Rights and freedoms are dignity and virtue of humanity"
- Composition method: Legislative/Executive appointment
- Authorised by: Constitution of Turkey
- Judge term length: 12 years or until age 65
- Number of positions: 15
- Website: www.anayasa.gov.tr

President of the Constitutional Court
- Currently: Kadir Özkaya
- Since: 2024
- Lead position ends: 4 years (renewable)

Vice Presidents of the Constitutional Court
- Currently: Basri Bağcı & Hasan Tahsin Gökcan
- Since: 2019
- Lead position ends: 4 years (renewable)

The Constitutional Court of Turkey (Turkish: Anayasa Mahkemesi or AYM) is the highest legal body for constitutional review in Turkey. It "examines the constitutionality, in respect of both form and substance, of laws, decrees having the force of law, and the Rules of Procedure of the Turkish Grand National Assembly" (Article 148/1 of the Turkish Constitution). If necessary, it also functions as the Supreme Criminal Court (Turkish: Yüce Divan) to hear any cases raised about the President, Vice President, members of the Cabinet, or judges of the high courts. In addition to those functions, it examines individual applications on the grounds that one of the fundamental rights and freedoms within the scope of the European Convention on Human Rights which are guaranteed by the Constitution has been violated by public authorities (Article 148/3 of the Turkish Constitution).

The Court is the seat of the Center for Training and Human Resources Development of the Association of Asian Constitutional Courts and Equivalent Institutions.

== Overview ==
Part Four, Section Two of the Constitution establishes the Constitutional Court that rules on the constitutionality of statutes and Presidential executive orders. The Court rules on issues referred to it by the President, the members of Parliament, or any judge before whom an exception of unconstitutionality has been raised by a defendant or a plaintiff. The Constitutional Court has the right to both a priori and a posteriori review (respectively, before and after enactment), and it can invalidate whole laws or governmental decrees and prevent their application in future cases. Challenges to a law must be made within the first two months of its promulgation. The court decides over the parliamentary immunity of the members of the Grand National Assembly of Turkey and has the authority to ban political parties.

== Organization ==
According to Article 146 of the Constitution, the Constitutional Court is composed of fifteen members.

The President appoints:

- three members from a list of three candidates for each vacant position nominated by the Court of Cassation among its own members,
- two members from a list of three candidates for each vacant position nominated by the Turkish Council of State among its own members,
- three (at least two of whom being lawyers) members from a list of three candidates for each vacant position nominated by the Higher Education Council among professors of law, economy or political sciences, who are themselves not members of the council, and
- four members among senior administrative officers, attorneys-at-law, judges, prosecutors, and Rapporteur Judges with at least five years of experience.

The Parliament appoints by secret ballot:

- two members from a list of three candidates for each vacant position nominated by the Court of Accounts (Turkish: Sayıştay) among its own members,
- one member from a list of three candidates for each vacant position nominated by the heads of bar associations among attorneys-at-law.

A two-thirds majority is required in the first ballot; if this majority is not reached, the absolute majority of MP's is required in the second ballot and. Failing this, a runoff election among the two candidates with the greatest number of votes will determine the winner. Ultimately, therefore, the dominant political force in parliament will decide by relative majority.

To qualify for appointments as a member of the Court, professors, senior administrative officers, and attorneys-at-law are required to be over the age of 40 and to have completed their higher education or to have served at least 15 years as teaching staff of institutions of higher education or to have actually worked at least 21 years in public service or to have practiced as a lawyer for at least 21 years.

The Constitutional Court elects a president and vice presidents from among its regular members for a renewable term of four years by secret ballot and by an absolute majority of their members. The members of the Constitutional Court are not allowed to assume other official and private functions, apart from their main functions.

== Composition ==
The Constitutional Court consists of 15 members:

#	Name	Rank	Date appointed	Term end	Selected by quota	Appointed by
1	Kadir Özkaya	President	18 December 2014	18 December 2026	Council of State	Recep Tayyip Erdoğan
2	Hasan Tahsin Gökcan	Vice President	17 March 2014	17 March 2026	Court of Cassation	Abdullah Gül
3	Basri Bağcı	Vice President	2 April 2020	2 April 2032	Court of Cassation	Recep Tayyip Erdoğan
4	Engin Yıldırım	Member	9 April 2010	9 February 2031	Council of Higher Education	Abdullah Gül
5	Muhterem İnce	Member	6 October 2022	6 October 2034	Court of Auditors	GNAT
6	Kenan Yaşar	Member	31 January 2022	31 January 2034	President of Bar	GNAT
7	Yılmaz Akçil	Member	30 January 2024	16 August 2033	Council of State	Recep Tayyip Erdoğan
8	Metin Kıratlı	Member	18 July 2024	14 February 2034	Executive or Lawyer	Recep Tayyip Erdoğan
9	Rıdvan Güleç	Member	13 March 2015	13 March 2027	Court of Auditors	GNAT
10	Recai Akyel	Member	25 August 2016	25 August 2028	Executive or Lawyer	Recep Tayyip Erdoğan
11	Yusuf Şevki Hakyemez	Member	25 August 2016	25 August 2028	Council of Higher Education	Recep Tayyip Erdoğan
12	Yıldız Seferinoğlu	Member	25 January 2019	25 January 2031	Executive or Lawyer	Recep Tayyip Erdoğan
13	Selahaddin Menteş	Member	5 July 2019	5 July 2031	Executive or Lawyer	Recep Tayyip Erdoğan
14	Ömer Çınar	Member	20 April 2024	20 April 2036	Council of Higher Education	Recep Tayyip Erdoğan
15	İrfan Fidan	Member	23 January 2021	23 January 2033	Court of Cassation	Recep Tayyip Erdoğan

== History ==
The Constitutional Court of Turkey was established on 25 April 1962, according to the provisions of the constitution of 1961. Prior to that date, absolute superiority of the parliament was adopted as a constitutional principle, with no judicial review. There existed no legal institution to review the constitutionality of laws passed by the parliament, and of acts and actions of governments. The social democratic opposition, intellectuals, and the military junta that came into power by military coup on 27 May 1960, supported limitation and control of the parliamentary power in the face of abuses of parliamentary majority by the Democratic Party governments (1950–60) under the premiership of Adnan Menderes. The Justice Party, a descendant of the Democratic Party; as well as Justice and Development Party have rejected the idea of judicial review, pushing for parliamentary superiority.

The first decision the court gave is dated 5 September 1962, which was published on the Official Gazette on 3 October 1962. It was about a direct petition by a certain İnaç Tureren for the annulment of an article of the Law of Criminal Procedure (Ceza Muhakemeleri Usûlü Kanunu - CMUK), which was claimed to be violating the provisions of Article 30 of the constitution. The court turned down the case, stating that individual application to the court was constitutionally impossible.

The first president of the court was Sünuhi Arsan, who served for two years (1962–64). Following the second (Ömer Lütfi Akadlı - 1964–66) and the third (İbrahim Senil - 1966–68) presidents, the court failed to elect a president for 29 months (until 1970) during which it was headed by an acting president.

The articles of the constitution regulating the structure of the court were slightly amended in 1971 and 1973.

Although the constitution of 1961 was annulled by the military regime that came into the power with the military coup of 12 September 1980, the court went on operating. It currently operates according to the constitution of 1982.

=== Key decisions ===
- Decision no. 1989–12, dated 7 March 1989: The Court, in response to then president Kenan Evren's application for annulment of a law passed by parliament, ruled that wearing headscarves in public universities violated the separation of religion and state.
- Decision no. 1994–2, dated 16 June 1994: The Court ruled to close the Democracy Party (Demokrasi Partisi – DEP), a pro-Kurdish party, on the grounds that it violated the principle of territorial/national integrity and indivisibility.
- Decision no. 1998–1, dated 16 January 1998: The Court ruled to close the Welfare Party (Refah Partisi – RP), an Islamist party, on the grounds that it was violating the principle of secularism.
- Decision no. 2001–2, dated 21 June 2001: The Court ruled to close the Virtue Party (Fazilet Partisi – FP), the successor to the Welfare Party. The decision, however, stated that the Court did not consider the FP to be the continuation of the RP, but cited the Islamist policies followed by the party as the main reasons behind the closure.
- Decision no. 2001–332, dated 18 July 2001: The Court, in response to applications made by regular courts, ruled that some parts of the Amnesty Law passed by the parliament were unconstitutional, which resulted in a minor expansion in the scope of the proposed amnesty.
- Decision dated 2008/7/30: In the 2008 Justice and Development Party closure trial, the court ruled that the Justice and Development Party did not violate the separation of religion and state and did not close it, but noted that it had become "a center for anti-secular activities" and cut the state's funding of the party's activities by 50%.
- Decision dated 2009/12/11: The court decided to ban the Democratic Society Party (DTP) for its links to the Kurdistan Workers Party (PKK), considered a terrorist group. It argued the DTP violated Articles 68 and 69 of the Constitution and the Political Parties Law. "The party became a focal point for terrorism against the indivisible integrity of the state.", stated Haşim Kılıç, president of the Court.
- Decision dated 26 December 2019 lifting the ban on Wikipedia.

== See also ==
- Judicial system of Turkey
- Constitution
- Constitutionalism
- Constitutional economics
- Jurisprudence
- Rule of law
- Judiciary
- Rule According to Higher Law
- Rapporteur Judge
- Association of Asian Constitutional Courts and Equivalent Institutions
