= Governor of Konya =

Governor of a Turkish Province

Governor of Konya Konya Valiliği
- Incumbent; İbrahim Akın since September 27, 2024
- Appointer: President of Turkey; On the recommendation of the Turkish government
- Term length: No set term length or limit
- Inaugural holder: Kazım Müfit Bey; February 12, 1922
- Website: Office of the Governor

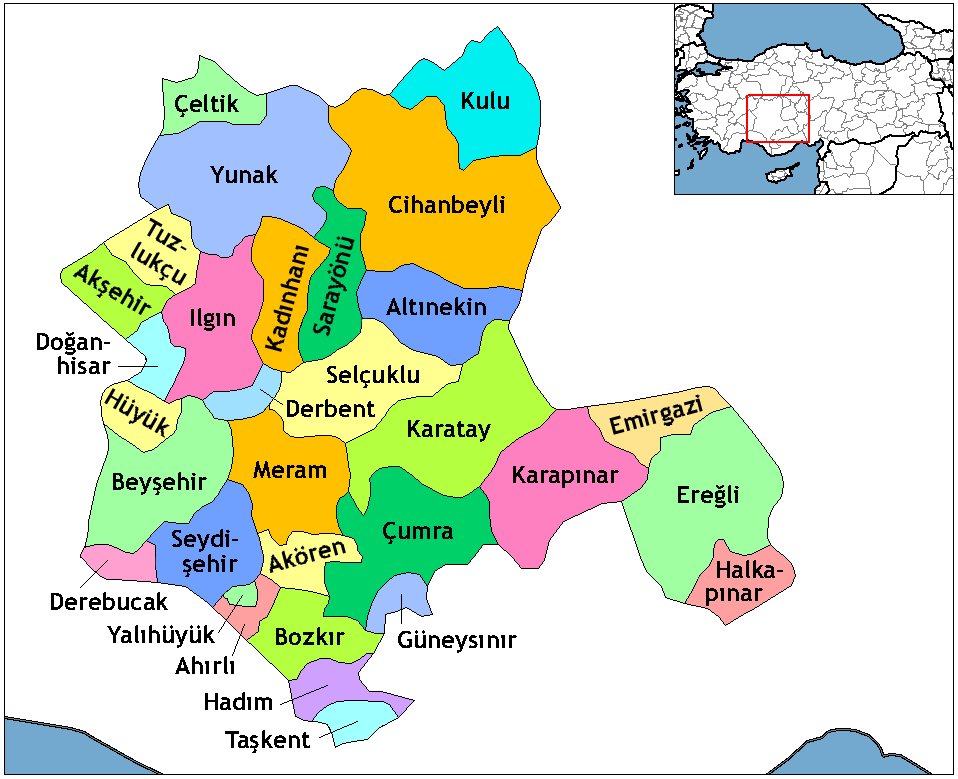
Map of the Province of Konya, showing the provincial districts.

Governor of Konya (Turkish: Konya Valiliği) is the civil service official responsible for both national government and state affairs in the Province of Konya. Similar to the Governors of the 80 other Provinces of Turkey, the Governor of Konya is appointed by the Government of Turkey and is responsible for the implementation of government legislation within Konya. The Governor is also the most senior commander of both the Konya provincial police force and the Konya Gendarmerie.

== Appointment ==
The Governor of Konya is appointed by the President of Turkey, who confirms the appointment after recommendation from the Turkish Government. The Ministry of the Interior first considers and puts forward possible candidates for approval by the cabinet. The Governor of Konya is therefore not a directly elected position and instead functions as the most senior civil servant in the province of Konya.

=== Term limits ===
The Governor is not limited by any term limits and does not serve for a set length of time. Instead, the Governor serves at the pleasure of the Government, which can appoint or reposition the Governor whenever it sees fit. Such decisions are again made by the cabinet of Turkey. The Governor of Konya, as a civil servant, may not have any close connections or prior experience in Konya Province. It is not unusual for Governors to alternate between several different Provinces during their bureaucratic career.

== Functions ==
The Governor of Konya has both bureaucratic functions and influence over local government. The main role of the Governor is to oversee the implementation of decisions by government ministries, constitutional requirements and legislation passed by Grand National Assembly within the provincial borders. The Governor also has the power to reassign, remove or appoint officials a certain number of public offices and has the right to alter the role of certain public institutions if they see fit. Governors are also the most senior public official within the Province, meaning that they preside over any public ceremonies or provincial celebrations being held due to a national holiday. As the commander of the provincial police and Gendarmerie forces, the Governor can also take decisions designed to limit civil disobedience and preserve public order. Although mayors of municipalities and councillors are elected during local elections, the Governor has the right to re-organise or to inspect the proceedings of local government despite being an unelected position.

== List of governors of Konya ==
- Kazım Müfit Bey (1922–1925)
- İbrahim Hazım Bey (1925–1928)
- Fuat Tuksal (1928–1932)
- Ahmet İzzet Bey (1932–1933)
- Zeynel Abidin Özmen (1933–1935)
- Cemal Bardakçı (1935–1939)
- Nizamettin Ataker (1939–1944)
- Sahip Örge (1944–1946)
- İhsan Sabri Çağlayangil (1946–1948)
- Cevat Ökmen (1948–1950)
- Hilmi İncesulu (1950–1951)
- Şefik San (1951–1953)
- Ahmet Tekelioğlu (1953–1954)
- Cemal Babaç (1954–1955)
- Kamil Tuncel (1955–1958)
- Etem Yetkiner (1958–1960)
- Hasan Basri Çantay (1960)
- Sait Koçak (1960–1961)
- Sedat Kirtetepe (1961–1964)
- Celal Coşkun (1964–1966)
- Ali Rıza Yaradanakul (1966–1968)
- Mustafa Yörükoğlu (1968–1971)
- Sabahattin Çakmakoğlu (1971–1975)
- Fikret Turgut Sayın (1975–1978)
- Nedim Evliya (1978–1979)
- Yılmaz Ergun (1979–1980)
- Kenan Güven (1980–1984)
- Rıdvan Yenişen (1984–1988)
- Doğan Ünlüsoy (1988–1991)
- Temel Koçaklar (1991–1992)
- Adnan Darendeliler (1992–1993)
- Ömer Haliloğlu (1993–1996)
- Muammer Güler (1996–2000)
- Ahmet Kayhan (2000–2006)
- Atilla Osmançelebioğlu (2006–2007)
- Osman Aydın (2007–2009)
- Aydın Nezih Doğan (2009–2013)
- Muammer Erol (2013–2016)
- Yakup Canbolat (2016–2018)
- Cüneyit Orhan Toprak (2018–2020)
- Vahdettin Özkan (2020–2024)
- İbrahim Akın (2024–)

== See also ==
- Governor (Turkey)
- Konya Province
- Ministry of the Interior (Turkey)
