= Ali Fidan =

Turkish bureaucrat (born 1970)

Governor of Düzce
- In office 9 March 2015 – August 2016
- President: Recep Tayyip Erdoğan
- Preceded by: Ali İhsan Su

Personal details
- Born: 1970 (age 55–56) Gerede, Bolu Province, Turkey
- Education: Istanbul University
- Occupation: Bureaucrat
- Website: Biography of the Governor

Ali Fidan (born 1970) is a Turkish bureaucrat who served as the Governor of Düzce between March 2015 and August 2016. He is a former Kaymakam (Sub-Governor of a district) and served as the Deputy Governor of Malatya between 2001 and 2003.

== Early life ==
Born in 1970 in the Gerede district of Bolu Province, he graduated from secondary school in 1988 and from high school in 1992. He graduated from Istanbul University Faculty of Political Science and was briefly a researcher at Abant İzzet Baysal University Faculty of Economic and Administrative Science. After beginning work at the Civil Administration as a candidate to become a Kaymakam, he was a researcher at Bournemouth University in the United Kingdom for eight months in 1994.

== Bureaucratic career ==
=== Kaymakam ===
Fidan served as the Deputy Kaymakam of the districts of Kurşunlu in Çankırı Province and Ulubey in Uşak Province before becoming the Kaymakam of Felahiye in Kayseri Province from 1997 to 1999 and Yazıhan in Malatya Province from 1999 to 2001. The office of the Kaymakam is similar to that of Governor, but a Kaymakam is the governor of a district rather than a Province.

=== General Directorate of Provincial Administration ===
After serving as a Kaymakam, Fidan was assigned to the General Directorate of Provincial Administration in 2003, serving as a branch manager until 2007. He became an office manager of the Directorate in 2007, serving until 2012. In 2012, he became the Deputy Director of Provincial Administration for a year, before being appointed the Director of Provincial Administration in 2013. He served in this capacity until 2015, when he was appointed as the Governor of Düzce.

=== Governor of Düzce ===
On 16 February 2015, Fidan was renamed as the governor of Düzce. He succeeded Ali İhsan Su and formally assumed his duties on 9 March 2015. His tenure began with meeting local relatives of war veterans and fallen soldiers, as well as organising iftar events for the month of Ramadan, which began shortly after he assumed the post. His tenure ended in August 2016 when he was named as the undersecretary of the Ministry of Defense. Fidan served in the latter post until April 2018 when he was removed from office.

== See also ==
- List of Turkish civil servants
