= Ali İhsan Su =

Turkish bureaucrat

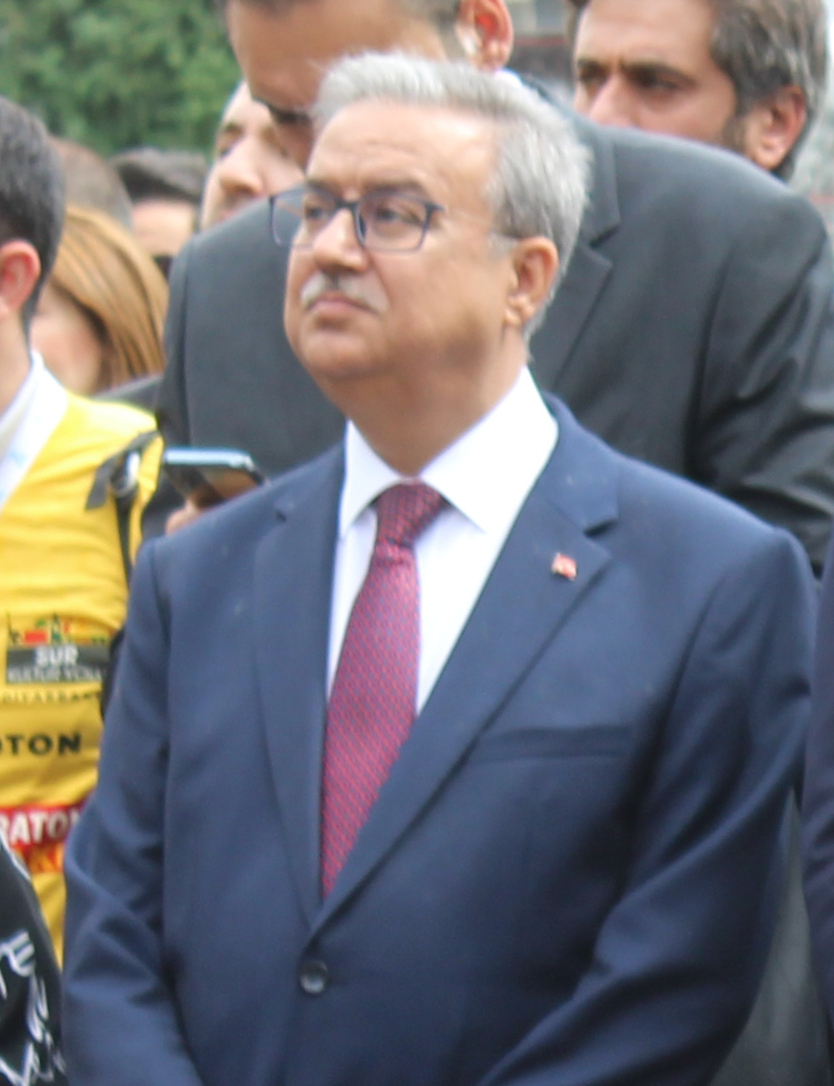

Governor of Diyarbakir
- Incumbent
- Assumed office May 2022

12th Governor of Şırnak
- In office February 23, 2015 – June 30, 2017
- President: Recep Tayyip Erdoğan
- Preceded by: Hasan İpek

8th Governor of Düzce
- In office August 23, 2013 – February 23, 2015
- President: Abdullah Gül; Recep Tayyip Erdoğan
- Preceded by: Adnan Yılmaz
- Succeeded by: Ali Fidan

Personal details
- Born: 25 June 1959 (age 67) Konya, Turkey
- Education: Istanbul University
- Occupation: Bureaucrat
- Website: Biography of the Governor

Ali İhsan Su (born 25 June 1959) is a Turkish bureaucrat who has served as the governor of Diyarbakır since May 2022, having been appointed by President Recep Tayyip Erdoğan on the recommendation of the Turkish Government. He previously served as the 8th governor of Düzce from 2013 to 2015, having been appointed by former president Abdullah Gül. He is a former Kaymakam (sub-governor of a district).

== Early life ==
Born in 1959 in Konya, Su was educated at Istanbul University Faculty of Political Science and graduated in 1985. He began working at the Central Administration as a Kaymakam candidate.

== Bureaucratic career ==
Su served as the Kaymakam for the district of Evren, Ankara in Ankara Province, Çermik in Diyarbakır Province, Çay, Afyonkarahisar in Afyonkarahisar Province, Söğüt in Bilecik Province, Terme in Samsun Province and İskenderun, Hatay Province. He also served as Deputy Governor of Hakkâri.

In 2013, he was appointed as the 8th Governor of Düzce after President Abdullah Gül approved his nomination by the Turkish Government. After serving for two years, he was reassigned as the 12th Governor of Şırnak.

== See also ==
- Governor (Turkey)
- List of Turkish civil servants
- Ministry of the Interior (Turkey)
