= Hasan İpek =

Turkish politician (born 1959)

11th Governor of Şırnak
- In office August 16, 2013 – February 23, 2015
- President: Abdullah Gül; Recep Tayyip Erdoğan
- Preceded by: Vahdettin Özkan
- Succeeded by: Ali İhsan Su

9th Governor of Bayburt
- In office August 30, 2011 – August 16, 2013
- President: Abdullah Gül
- Preceded by: Kerem Al
- Succeeded by: Mükerrem Ünlüer

Personal details
- Born: 1959 (age 66–67) Karabük, Turkey
- Education: Istanbul University
- Occupation: Bureaucrat

Hasan İpek (born 1959) is a Turkish bureaucrat who served as the 11th Governor of Şırnak from 2013 to 2015, having been appointed by President Abdullah Gül on the recommendation of the Turkish Government. He previously served as the 9th Governor of Bayburt from 2011 to 2013. He is a former advisor to the Prime Minister of Turkey. He is a former Kaymakam (Sub-Governor of a district).

== Early life and career ==
Born in 1959 in Karabük, İpek graduated from Istanbul University Faculty of Law and served as the Kaymakam of the districts of İnebolu, Cide, Koyulhisar and Aralık. He has also served as the Deputy Governor of İzmir, Kütahya and Burdur. He worked at the Ministry of the Interior and became an advisor to the Prime Minister of Turkey before being appointed as the 9th Governor of Bayburt in 2011. He served until 2013, after which he served as the 11th Governor of Şırnak until 2015. He has since become a Central Governor.

He is married with three children.

== See also ==
- Governor (Turkey)
- List of Turkish civil servants
- Ministry of the Interior (Turkey)
