= Adnan Yılmaz =

Turkish bureaucrat

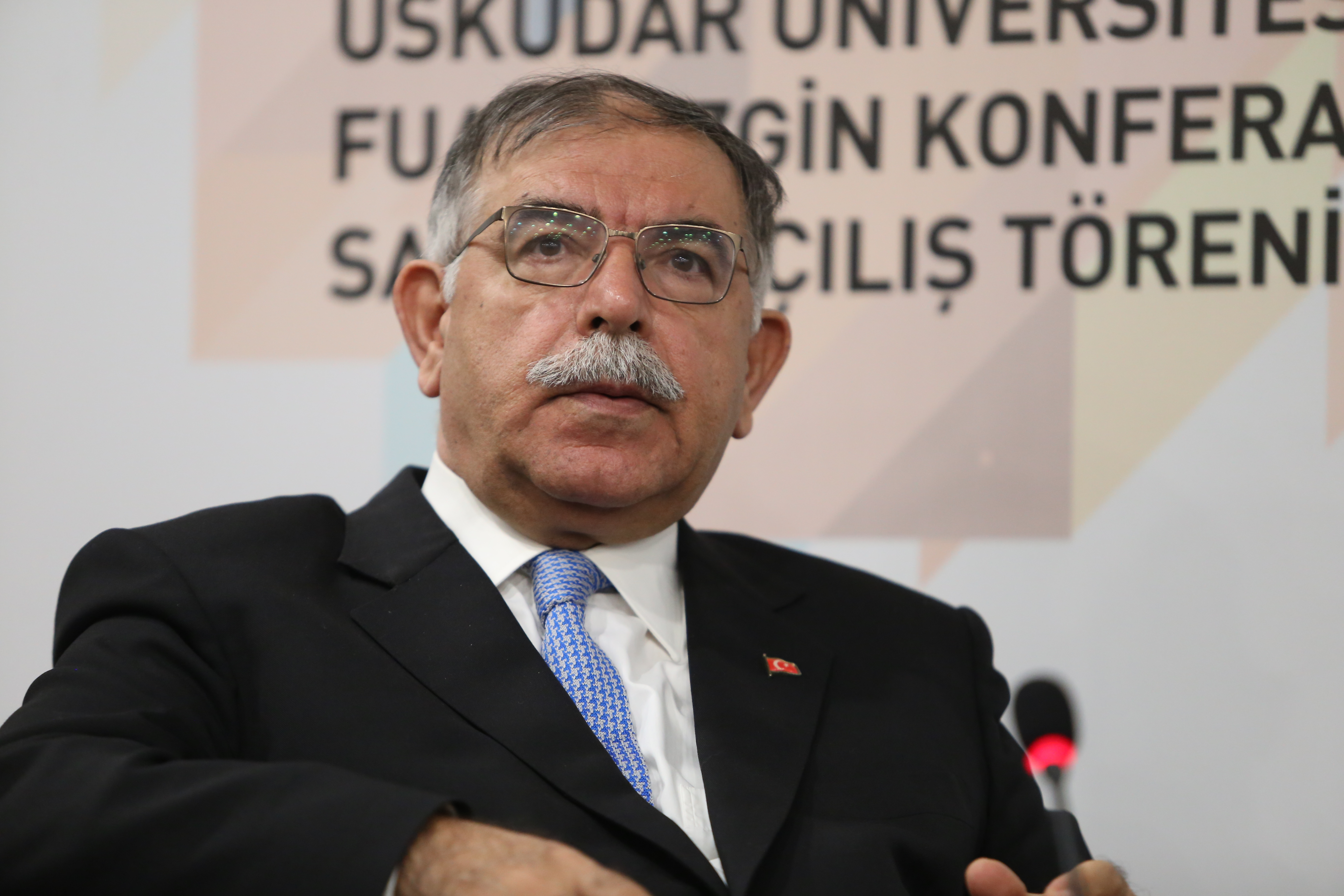

7th Governor of Düzce
- In office August 17, 2012 – August 18, 2013
- President: Abdullah Gül
- Preceded by: Vasip Şahin
- Succeeded by: Ali İhsan Su

Personal details
- Born: 1954 (age 71–72) Gürün, Sivas, Turkey
- Education: Istanbul University
- Occupation: Bureaucrat

Adnan Yılmaz (born 1954) is a Turkish bureaucrat who served as the 7th Governor of Düzce between 2012 and 2013, appointed by President Abdullah Gül on the recommendation of the Turkish Government. He also served as the chief inspector of the Civil Service before being appointed Governor and worked at the Interior Ministry as the Head of Strategy Development. He is a former Kaymakam (Sub-Governor of a district)

== Early life ==
Adnan Yılmaz was born in Gürün, Sivas in 1954 and graduated from Istanbul University Faculty of Law in 1977. He then went on to become a candidate to become a Kaymakam candidate. He is married with three children. He is the older brother of Justice and Development Party MP İsmet Yılmaz, the former Minister of National Defence and current Speaker of the Grand National Assembly.

== Bureaucratic career ==
Yılmaz served as the Kaymakam for the districts of Şebinkarahisar, Boğazlıyan, Gürpınar, Nusaybin, Perşembe. He later worked as an inspector of the civil service and later went on to become the chief inspector, after which he served as the Head of Strategy Development at the Interior Ministry. On 1 August 2012, the government appointed him as the 7th Governor of Düzce and was confirmed by President Abdullah Gül. He served for one year, leaving office on 18 August 2013.

== See also ==
- Governor (Turkey)
- List of Turkish civil servants
- Ministry of the Interior (Turkey)
