= Vahdettin Özkan =

Turkish statesperson (born 1968)

41st Governor of Konya
- In office 10 July 2020 – 27 September 2024
- President: Recep Tayyip Erdoğan
- Preceded by: Cüneyit Orhan Toprak
- Succeeded by: İbrahim Akin

55th Governor of Kahramanmaraş
- In office 1 July 2016 – 10 July 2020
- President: Recep Tayyip Erdoğan
- Preceded by: Mustafa Hakan Güvençer
- Succeeded by: Ömer Faruk Coşkun

46th Governor of Isparta
- In office August 3, 2013 – 1 July 2016
- President: Abdullah Gül; Recep Tayyip Erdoğan
- Preceded by: Memduh Oğuz

10th Governor of Şırnak
- In office May 13, 2010 – August 3, 2013
- President: Abdullah Gül
- Preceded by: Ali Yerlikaya
- Succeeded by: Hasan İpek

Personal details
- Born: 1968 (age 57–58) Muş, Turkey
- Children: 2
- Education: Istanbul University
- Occupation: Bureaucrat

Vahdettin Özkan (born 1968) is a Turkish bureaucrat who has served as the 46th Governor of Isparta since August 2013, having been appointed by President Abdullah Gül on the recommendation of the Turkish Government. He previously served as the Governor for various districts. He is a former Kaymakam (Sub-Governor of a district).

== Early life ==
Born in 1968 in Muş, he graduated from Istanbul University Faculty of Political Science in 1989. He subsequently became a Kaymakam candidate in Bingöl from 1990 to 1993.

== Bureaucratic career ==
Özkan became the Kaymakam of Ilıca, in Erzurum Province in 1993 and served until 1995. He later served as the Kaymakam for Bahçesaray in Van Province from 1995 to 1997, after which he was appointed Deputy Governor of Van and served until 2000. Between 2003 and 2004, he served Deputy Governor of Diyarbakır. After briefly working at the Ministry of the Interior between 2004 and 2006, he was appointed the 10th Governor of Şırnak in 2010 and served until 2013. He was then re-appointed as the 46th Governor of Isparta which he served until 1 July 2016, becoming the 55th Governor of Kahramanmaraş the same day. On 10 July 2020 he was appointed as the 41st Governor of Konya.

== See also ==
- Governor (Turkey)
- List of Turkish civil servants
