= Governor of Malatya =

Governor of a Turkish Province

Governor of Malatya Malatya Valiliği
- Logo of the Governor of Malatya
- Incumbent; Engin Sarıibrahim since January 19, 2026
- Appointer: President of Turkey; On the recommendation of the Turkish government
- Term length: No set term length or limit
- Inaugural holder: Mehmet Şükrü Yaşin
- Website: Office of the Governor

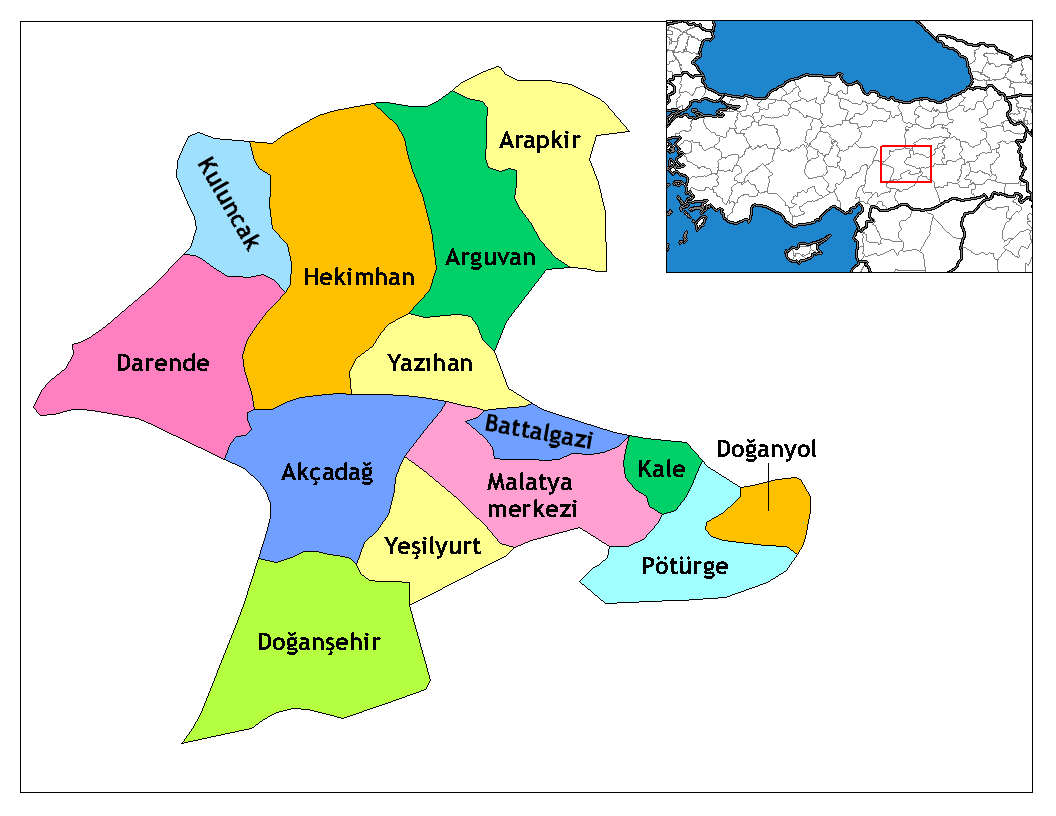
Map of the Province of Malatya, showing the provincial districts.

Governor of Malatya (Turkish: Malatya Valiliği) is the Civil service official responsible for both national government and state affairs in the Province of Malatya. Similar to the Governors of the 80 other Provinces of Turkey, the Governor of Malatya is appointed by the Government of Turkey and is responsible for the implementation of government legislation within Malatya. The Governor is also the most senior commander of both the Malatya provincial police force and the Malatya Gendarmerie.

== Appointment ==
The Governor of Malatya is appointed by the President of Turkey, who confirms the appointment after recommendation from the Turkish Government. The Ministry of the Interior first considers and puts forward possible candidates for approval by the cabinet. The Governor of Malatya is therefore not a directly elected position and instead functions as the most senior civil servant in the Province of Malatya.

=== Term limits ===
The Governor is not limited by any term limits and does not serve for a set length of time. Instead, the Governor serves at the pleasure of the Government, which can appoint or reposition the Governor whenever it sees fit. Such decisions are again made by the cabinet of Turkey. The Governor of Malatya, as a civil servant, may not have any close connections or prior experience in Malatya Province. It is not unusual for Governors to alternate between several different Provinces during their bureaucratic career.

== Functions ==
The Governor of Malatya has both bureaucratic functions and influence over local government. The main role of the Governor is to oversee the implementation of decisions by government ministries, constitutional requirements and legislation passed by Grand National Assembly within the provincial borders. The Governor also has the power to reassign, remove or appoint officials a certain number of public offices and has the right to alter the role of certain public institutions if they see fit. Governors are also the most senior public official within the Province, meaning that they preside over any public ceremonies or provincial celebrations being held due to a national holiday. As the commander of the provincial police and Gendarmerie forces, the Governor can also take decisions designed to limit civil disobedience and preserve public order. Although mayors of municipalities and councillors are elected during local elections, the Governor has the right to re-organise or to inspect the proceedings of local government despite being an unelected position.

== List of governors of Malatya ==
- Mehmet Vehbi Demirel (1922–1924)
- Nazmi Toker (1924–1926)
- Nevzat Tandoğan (1927)
- İbrahim Hazım Bey (1927–1928)
- Fevzi Toker (1928–1932)
- İbrahim Sabri Çıtak (1932–1933)
- Mustafa Adli Bayman (1933–1935)
- Rifat Şahinbaş (1935–1939)
- Burhanettin Teker (1939–1941)
- Sahip Örge (1941–1944)
- İhsan Aras (1944–1945)
- Eşref Erkut (1945–1946)
- Kudret Kantoğlu (1946–1948)
- Mitat Ali Kışlalı (1948–1950)
- Turgut Başkaya (1950–1952)
- Cavit Ortaç (1952–1954)
- Kamil Tuncel (1954–1955)
- Kazım Akdoğan (1955–1957)
- Hasan Basri Çantay (1957–1960)
- Sait Koçak (1960)
- Sedat Kirtetepe (1960–1962)
- Celal Coşkun (1962–1964)
- Ali Rıza Yaradanakul (1964–1966)
- Mustafa Yörükoğlu (1966–1968)
- Sabahattin Çakmakoğlu (1968–1970)
- Fikret Turgut Sayın (1970–1972)
- Nedim Evliya (1972–1975)
- Yüksel Çavuşoğlu (1975–1977)
- Cemal Tekay (1977–1978)
- Yılmaz Ergun (1978–1979)
- Kenan Güven (1979–1980)
- Rıdvan Yenişen (1980–1984)
- Doğan Ünlüsoy (1984–1986)
- Temel Koçaklar (1986–1988)
- Adnan Darendeliler (1988–1991)
- Ömer Haliloğlu (1991–1992)
- Saffet Arıkan Bedük (1992–1993)
- Kutlu Aktaş (1993–1995)
- Atilla Vural (1995–1997)
- Mustafa Yıldırım (1997–1999)
- Ali Fuat Güven (1999–2003)
- Osman Derya Kadıoğlu (2003–2006)
- Halil İbrahim Daşöz (2006–2008)
- Mehmet Ulvi Saran (2009–2012)
- Vasip Şahin (2012–2014)
- Süleyman Kamçı (2014–2016)
- Mustafa Toprak (2016–2017)
- Ali Kaban (2017–2018)
- Aydın Baruş (2018–2022)
- Hulusi Şahin (2022–2023)
- Ersin Yazıcı (2023–2024)
- Seddar Yavuz (2024–2026)
- Engin Sarıibrahim (2026–)

== See also ==
- Governor (Turkey)
- Malatya Province
- Ministry of the Interior (Turkey)
