= Governor of Ankara =

Governor of a Turkish Province

Governor of Ankara Ankara Valiliği
- Logo of the Governor of Ankara
- Incumbent; Yakup Canbolat since May 4, 2026
- Appointer: President of Turkey; On the recommendation of the Turkish government
- Term length: No set term length or limit
- Inaugural holder: Murat Bey; August 19, 1920
- Website: Office of the Governor

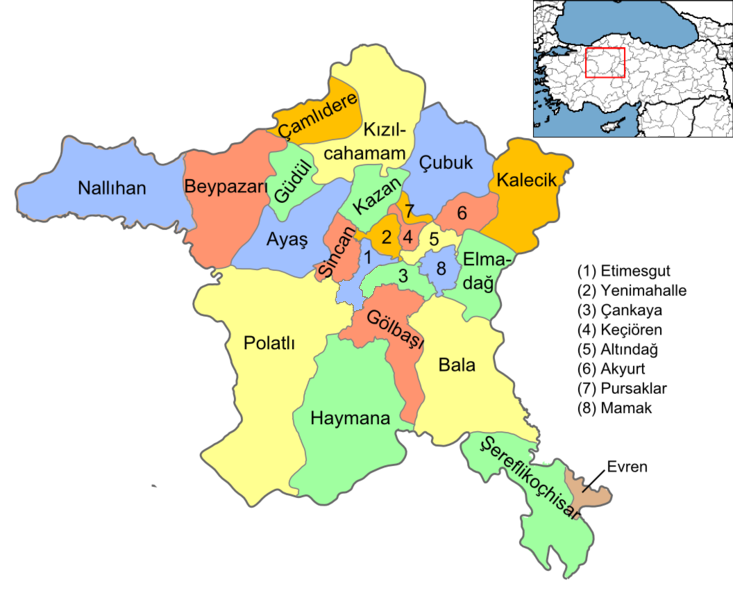
Map of the Province of Ankara, showing the provincial districts.

The Governor of Ankara (Turkish: Ankara Valiliği) is the bureaucratic state official responsible for both national government and state affairs in the Province of Ankara. Similar to the Governors of the 80 other Provinces of Turkey, the Governor of Ankara is appointed by the Government of Turkey and is responsible for the implementation of government legislation within Ankara. The Governor is also the most senior commander of both the Ankara provincial police force and the Ankara Gendarmerie.

The incumbent governor, Vasip Şahin, was appointed on November 6, 2018.

== Appointment ==
The Governor of Ankara is appointed by the President of Turkey, who confirms the appointment after recommendation from the Turkish Government. The Ministry of the Interior first considers and puts forward possible candidates for approval by the cabinet. The Governor of Ankara is therefore not a directly elected position and instead functions as the most senior civil servant in the Province of Ankara.

=== Term limits ===
The Governor is not limited by any term limits and does not serve for a set length of time. Instead, the Governor serves at the pleasure of the Government, which can appoint or reposition the Governor whenever it sees fit. Such decisions are again made by the cabinet of Turkey. The Governor of Ankara, as a civil servant, may not have any close connections or prior experience in Ankara Province. It is not unusual for Governors to alternate between several different Provinces during their bureaucratic career.

== Functions ==
The Governor of Ankara has both bureaucratic functions and influence over local government. The main role of the Governor is to oversee the implementation of decisions by government ministries, constitutional requirements and legislation passed by Grand National Assembly within the provincial borders. The Governor also has the power to reassign, remove or appoint officials a certain number of public offices and has the right to alter the role of certain public institutions if they see fit. Governors are also the most senior public official within the Province, meaning that they preside over any public ceremonies or provincial celebrations being held due to a national holiday. As the commander of the provincial police and Gendarmerie forces, the Governor can also take decisions designed to limit civil disobedience and preserve public order. Although mayors of municipalities and councillors are elected during local elections, the Governor has the right to re-organise or to inspect the proceedings of local government despite being an unelected position.

== List of governors of Ankara ==
- Yahya Galip Kargı (1919–1923)
- Murat Bey (1923)
- Mehmet Atıf Tüzün (1923–1925)
- Mehmet Akif Bey (1925–1929)
- Nevzat Tandoğan (1929–1946)
- Osman Sabri Adal (1946)
- İzzettin Çağpar (1946–1948)
- Mehmet Avni Doğan (1948–1950)
- Necati İlter (1950–1952)
- Kemal Aygün (1952–1955)
- Cemal Göktan (1955–1957)
- Kemal Aygün (1957–1958)
- Abdullah Dilaver Argun (1958–1960)
- İrfan Baştuğ (Askeri vali) (1960)
- İhsan Orgun (Askeri vali) (1960–1961)
- Nuri Teoman (1961–1962)
- Enver Kuray (1962–1966)
- Ali Celalettin Coşkun (1966–1968)
- Tekin Alp (vekil) (1968)
- Ömer Naci Bozkurt (1968–1970)
- Ömer Naci Bozkurt (vekil) (1970)
- Ali Rıza Yaradanakul (1970–1971)
- Şerif Tüten (1971–1975)
- Ömer Naci Bozkurt (1975)
- Mustafa Gönül (vekil) (1975–1976)
- Durmuş Yalçın (1976–1978)
- Tekin Alp (1978–1979)
- Vecdi Gönül (1979–1980)
- Mustafa Gönül (1980–1984)
- Cahit Bayar (1984–1988)
- Saffet Arıkan Bedük (1988–1991)
- Erdoğan Şahinoğlu (1991–1999)
- Yahya Gür (1999–2004)
- Kemal Önal (2004–2010)
- Alaaddin Yüksel (2010–2014)
- Mehmet Kılıçlar (2014–2016)
- Ercan Topaca (2016-2018)
- Vasip Şahin (2018-2026)
- Yakup Canbolat (2026–)

== See also ==
- Governor (Turkey)
- Ankara Province
- Ministry of the Interior (Turkey)
