= Governor of Düzce =

Governor of a Turkish Province

Governor of Düzce Düzce Valiliği
- Logo of the Governor of Düzce
- Incumbent; Mehmet Makas since January 19, 2026
- Appointer: President of Turkey; On the recommendation of the Turkish government
- Term length: No set term length or limit
- Inaugural holder: Fikret Güven; February 7, 2000
- Website: Office of the Governor

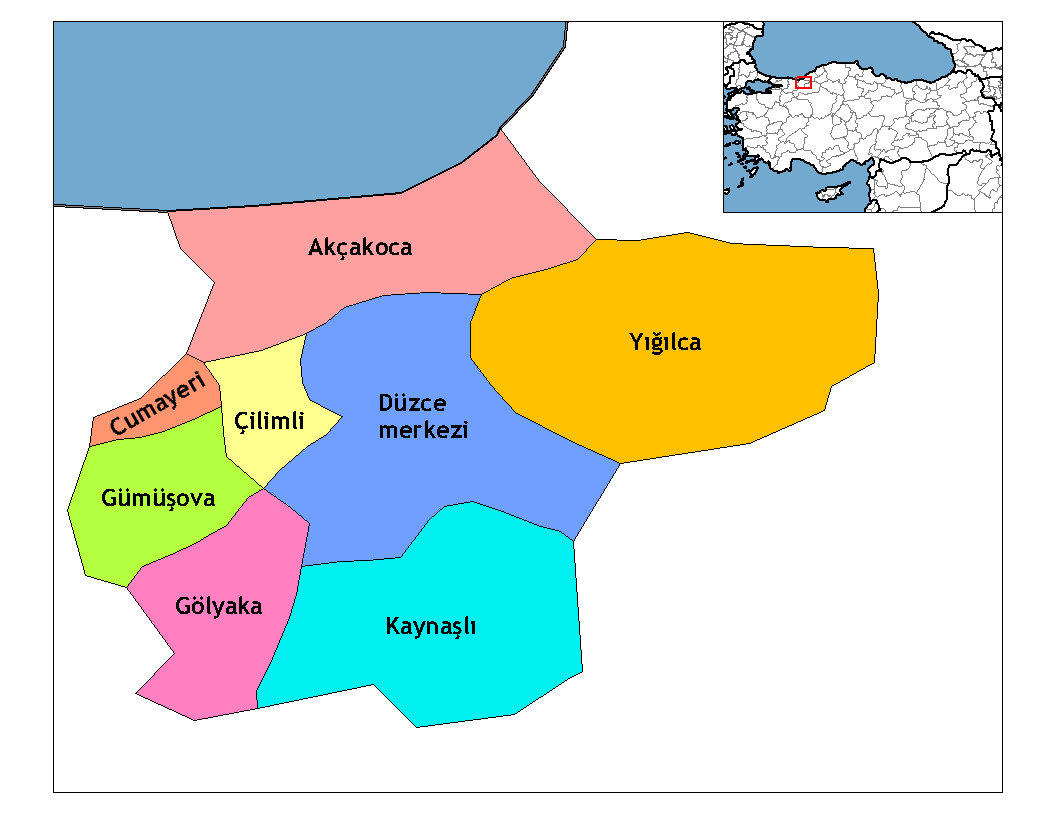
Map of the Province of Düzce, showing the provincial districts.

The Governor of Düzce (Turkish: Düzce Valiliği) is the bureaucratic state official responsible for both national government and state affairs in the Province of Düzce. Similar to the Governors of the 80 other Provinces of Turkey, the Governor of Düzce is appointed by the Government of Turkey and is responsible for the implementation of government legislation within Düzce. The Governor is also the most senior commander of both the Düzce provincial police force and the Düzce Gendarmerie.

== Appointment ==
The Governor of Düzce is appointed by the President of Turkey, who confirms the appointment after recommendation from the Turkish Government. The Ministry of the Interior first considers and puts forward possible candidates for approval by the cabinet. The Governor of Düzce is therefore not a directly elected position and instead functions as the most senior civil servant in the Province of Düzce.

=== Term limits ===
The Governor is not limited by any term limits and does not serve for a set length of time. Instead, the Governor serves at the pleasure of the Government, which can appoint or reposition the Governor whenever it sees fit. Such decisions are again made by the cabinet of Turkey. The Governor of Düzce, as a civil servant, may not have any close connections or prior experience in Düzce Province. It is not unusual for Governors to alternate between several different Provinces during their bureaucratic career.

== Functions ==
The Governor of Düzce has both bureaucratic functions and influence over local government. The main role of the Governor is to oversee the implementation of decisions by government ministries, constitutional requirements and legislation passed by Grand National Assembly within the provincial borders. The Governor also has the power to reassign, remove or appoint officials a certain number of public offices and has the right to alter the role of certain public institutions if they see fit. Governors are also the most senior public official within the Province, meaning that they preside over any public ceremonies or provincial celebrations being held due to a national holiday. As the commander of the provincial police and Gendarmerie forces, the Governor can also take decisions designed to limit civil disobedience and preserve public order. Although mayors of municipalities and councillors are elected during local elections, the Governor has the right to re-organise or to inspect the proceedings of local government despite being an unelected position.

== List of governors of Düzce ==
Governors of Düzce
#	Governor	Portrait	Took office	Left office	Appointed by
1	Fikret Güven		February 7, 2000	January 15, 2003	Ahmet Necdet Sezer
2	Cengiz Bulut		January 17, 2003	June 4, 2004	Ahmet Necdet Sezer
3	Halil Nimetoğlu		August 20, 2004	May 8, 2007	Ahmet Necdet Sezer
4	Ercan Topaca		May 18, 2007	February 15, 2008	Ahmet Necdet Sezer
5	Bülent Kılınç		February 18, 2008	June 4, 2010	Abdullah Gül
6	Vasip Şahin		June 7, 2010	August 17, 2012	Abdullah Gül
7	Adnan Yılmaz		August 17, 2012	August 18, 2013	Abdullah Gül
8	Ali İhsan Su		August 23, 2013	February 23, 2015	Abdullah Gül
9	Ali Fidan		March 9, 2015	September 7, 2016	Recep Tayyip Erdoğan
10	Zülkif Dağlı		September 7, 2016	June 19, 2020	Recep Tayyip Erdoğan
11	Cevdet Atay		June 19, 2020	August 16, 2023	Recep Tayyip Erdoğan
12	Selçuk Aslan		August 16, 2023	January 16, 2026	Recep Tayyip Erdoğan
13	Mehmet Makas		January 19, 2026		Recep Tayyip Erdoğan

== See also ==
- Governor (Turkey)
- Düzce Province
- Ministry of the Interior (Turkey)
