= Governor of Mersin =

Governor of a Turkish Province

Governor of Mersin Mersin Valiliği
- Logo of the Governor of Mersin
- Incumbent; Atilla Toros since February 12, 2025
- Appointer: President of Turkey; On the recommendation of the Turkish government
- Term length: No set term length or limit
- Inaugural holder: Kemal Bey; 1922
- Website: Office of the Governor

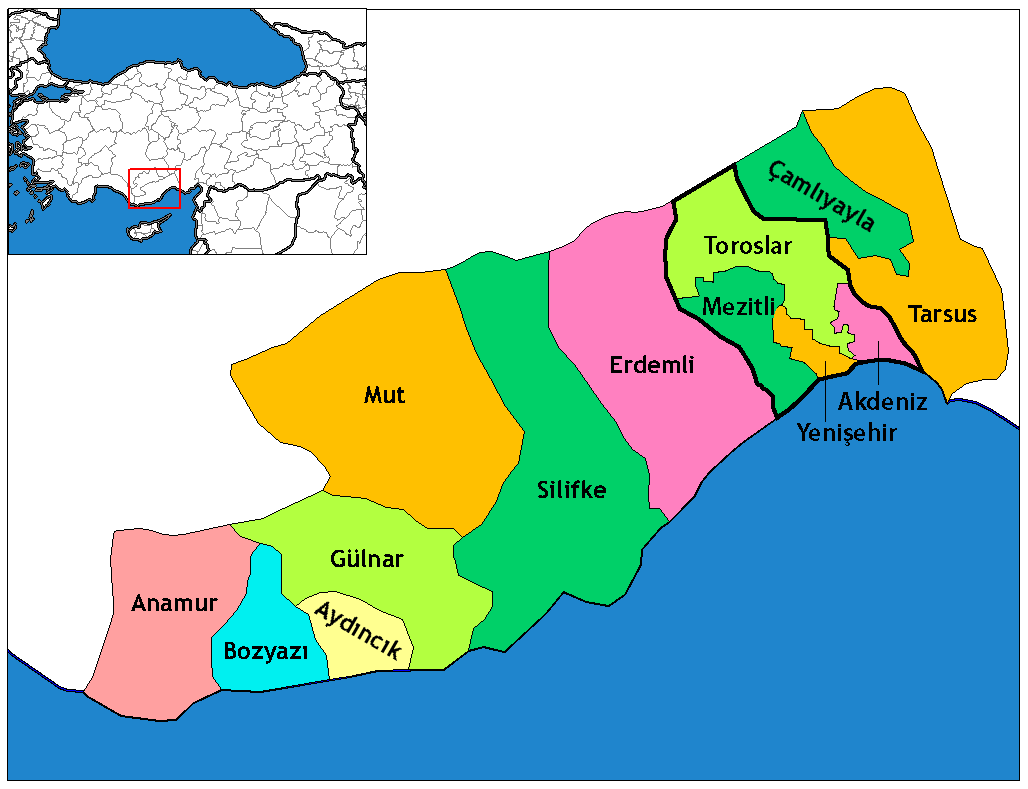
Map of the Province of Mersin, showing the provincial districts.

The Governor of Mersin (Turkish: Mersin Valiliği) is the bureaucratic state official responsible for both national government and state affairs in the Province of Mersin. Similar to the governors of the 80 other Provinces of Turkey, the Governor of Mersin is appointed by the government of Turkey and is responsible for the implementation of government legislation within Mersin. The governor is also the most senior commander of both the Mersin provincial police force and the Mersin Gendarmerie.

== Appointment ==
The Governor of Mersin is appointed by the President of Turkey, who confirms the appointment after a recommendation from the Turkish Government. The Ministry of the Interior first considers and puts forward possible candidates for approval by the cabinet. The Governor of Mersin is therefore not a directly elected position and instead functions as the most senior civil servant in the Province of Mersin.

=== Term limits ===
The governor is not limited by any term limits and does not serve for a set length of time. Instead, the governor serves at the pleasure of the government, which can appoint or reposition the governor whenever it sees fit. Such decisions are again made by the cabinet of Turkey. The Governor of Mersin, as a civil servant, may not have any close connections or prior experience in Mersin Province. It is not unusual for governors to alternate between several different provinces during their bureaucratic careers.

== Functions ==
The Governor of Mersin has both bureaucratic functions and influence over local government. The main role of the governor is to oversee the implementation of decisions by government ministries, constitutional requirements and legislation passed by the Grand National Assembly within the provincial borders. The governor also has the power to reassign, remove or appoint officials to a certain number of public offices and has the right to alter the role of certain public institutions if they see fit. Governors are also the most senior public officials within the province, meaning that they preside over any public ceremonies or provincial celebrations being held due to a national holiday. As the commander of the provincial police and gendarmerie forces, the governor can also take decisions designed to limit civil disobedience and preserve public order. Although mayors of municipalities and councillors are elected during local elections, the governor has the right to re-organise or to inspect the proceedings of local government despite being an in unelected position.

== List of governors of Mersin ==
- Kemal Bey (1924–1925)
- Tevfik Sırrı Gür (1930–1932)
- Sabahattin Çakmakoğlu (1984–1988)
- Şenol Engin (1996–2001)
- Ali İhsan Su (2017–2022)
- Ali Hamza Pehlivan (2022–2025)
- Atilla Toros (2025–present)

== See also ==
- Governor (Turkey)
- Mersin Province
- Ministry of the Interior (Turkey)
