= İbrahim Akın =

İbrahim Akın may refer to:

- İbrahim Akın (footballer)
- İbrahim Akın (politician)
