= Vasip Şahin =

Turkish civil servant (born 1964)

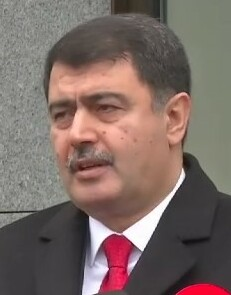

38th Governor of Ankara
- In office November 6, 2018 – May 4, 2026
- President: Recep Tayyip Erdoğan
- Preceded by: Ercan Topaca
- Succeeded by: Yakup Canbolat

21st Governor of İstanbul
- In office September 25, 2014 – November 1, 2018
- President: Recep Tayyip Erdoğan
- Preceded by: Hüseyin Avni Mutlu
- Succeeded by: Ali Yerlikaya

37th Governor of Malatya
- In office August 31, 2012 – September 24, 2014
- President: Abdullah Gül; Recep Tayyip Erdoğan
- Preceded by: Ulvi Saran
- Succeeded by: Süleyman Kamçı

6th Governor of Düzce
- In office June 7, 2010 – August 17, 2012
- President: Abdullah Gül
- Preceded by: Bülent Kılınç
- Succeeded by: Adnan Yılmaz

Personal details
- Born: 1964 (age 61–62) Bayburt, Turkey
- Education: Istanbul University
- Occupation: Civil servant

Vasip Şahin (born 1964) is a Turkish civil servant. Currently, he serves as the Governor of Ankara Province.

== Life ==
He was born in Bayburt in 1964. He completed his primary, secondary and high school education in Erzincan. In 1985, Şahin graduated from Faculty of Law in Istanbul University.

Vasip Şahin is married, and is father of three.

== Career ==
He began his civil servant career as a district governor candidate in Erzincan in June 1986. He was sent to the United Kingdom for further studies for one year in 1987. Upon returning home, he served as district governor in Küre, Kastamonu, Pütürge, Malatya, Mudurnu, Bolu, Kızılcahamam, Ankara, and then as deputy province governor in Muş and Düzce.

In 2003, Şahin was appointed legal advisor at the Ministry of the Interior and department head at the General Directoriate of Civil Defence. He served as deputy general manager and later as general manager of the Provincial Administration between 2005 and 2010.

Vasip Şahin became province governor in Düzce in 2010 serving until 2012. His next post was governor of Malatya. On September 15, 2014, he was appointed governor of Istanbul Province. He took of on September 25.

Political offices
Preceded by Ercan Topaca	Governor of Ankara; 8 November 2018 – 4 May 2026	Succeeded by Yakup Canbolat
