= Governor of Van =

State official in Turkey

Governor of Van Van Valiliği
- Logo of the Governor of Van
- Incumbent; Ozan Balcı since May 11, 2022
- Appointer: President of Turkey On the recommendation of the Turkish government
- Term length: No set term length or limit
- Inaugural holder: Mehmet Kadri Üçok; 1920
- Website: Office of the Governor

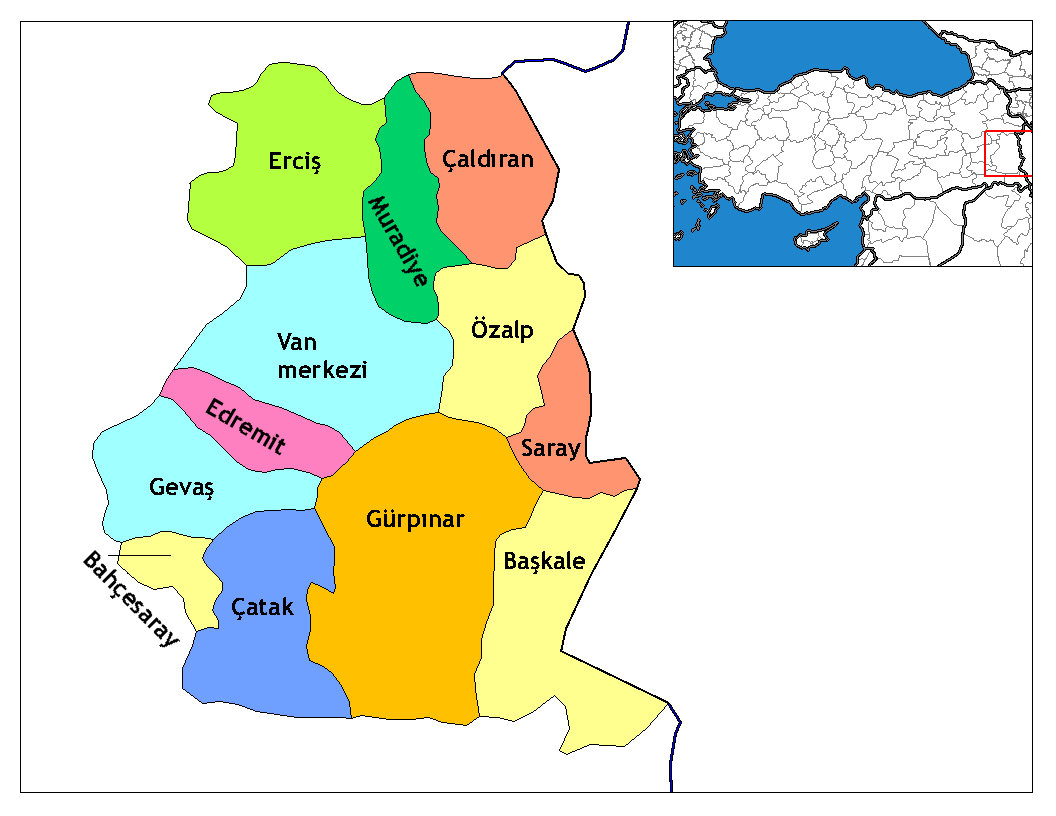
Map of the Province of Van, showing the provincial districts.

The Governor of Van (Turkish: Van Valiliği) is the bureaucratic state official responsible for both national government and state affairs in the Province of Van. Similar to the Governors of the 80 other Provinces of Turkey, the Governor of Van is appointed by the Government of Turkey and is responsible for the implementation of government legislation within Van. The Governor is also the most senior commander of both the Van provincial police force and the Van Gendarmerie.

== Appointment ==
The Governor of Van is appointed by the President of Turkey, who confirms the appointment after recommendation from the Turkish Government. The Ministry of the Interior first considers and puts forward possible candidates for approval by the cabinet. The Governor of Van is therefore not a directly elected position and instead functions as the most senior civil servant in the Province of Van.

=== Term limits ===
The Governor is not limited by any term limits and does not serve for a set length of time. Instead, the Governor serves at the pleasure of the Government, which can appoint or reposition the Governor whenever it sees fit. Such decisions are again made by the cabinet of Turkey. The Governor of Van, as a civil servant, may not have any close connections or prior experience in Van Province. It is not unusual for Governors to alternate between several different Provinces during their bureaucratic career.

== Functions ==
The Governor of Van has both bureaucratic functions and influence over local government. The main role of the Governor is to oversee the implementation of decisions by government ministries, constitutional requirements and legislation passed by Grand National Assembly within the provincial borders. The Governor also has the power to reassign, remove or appoint officials a certain number of public offices and has the right to alter the role of certain public institutions if they see fit. Governors are also the most senior public official within the Province, meaning that they preside over any public ceremonies or provincial celebrations being held due to a national holiday. As the commander of the provincial police and Gendarmerie forces, the Governor can also take decisions designed to limit civil disobedience and preserve public order. Although mayors of municipalities and councillors are elected during local elections, the Governor has the right to re-organise or to inspect the proceedings of local government despite being an unelected position.

== List of governors of Van ==
- Mehmet Kadri Üçok (1920–1923)
- Zühtü Durukan (1923–1924)
- Süleyman Sabri Bey (1924–1925)
- Osman Nuri Paşa (1925–1926)
- Nuri Bey (1926–1927)
- Nurettin Bey (1928–1929)
- Bekir Sami Baran (1929–1931)
- Mithat İzzet Saylam (1931–1932)
- Gafur Soylu (1945–1947)
- Nurettin Aynuksa (1947–1949)
- Niyazi Dalokay (1949–1950)
- Mehmet Emin Ergüven (1950–1951)
- İlhan Engin (1951–1955)
- Ahmet Fevzi Hamurculu (1955–1957)
- İbrahim Sadi Öztürk (1957–1959)
- Fikret Ersanlı (1959–1960)
- Namık Kemal Şentürk (1960–1961)
- Mehmet Nazım Öner (1961–1963)
- Naci Babacan (1963–1966)
- Mahmut Polat (1966–1968)
- Tekin Alp (1968–1970)
- Ahmet Tosun (1970–1973)
- Bekir Öztürk (1973–1977)
- Doğan Pazarcıklı (1977–1978)
- Y. Uğur Ünal (1978–1979)
- Nazmi İyibil (1979–1980)
- Behçet Eren (1980–1981)
- Özdemir Hanoğlu (1981–1984)
- Adnan Darendeliler (1984–1988)
- Nurettin Turan (1988–1991)
- Mahmut Yılbaş (1991–1992)
- Abdulkadir Sarı (1992–1995)
- Durmuş Koç (1996–1999)
- Hikmet Tan (1999–2003)
- Mehmet Niyazi Tanılır (2003–2004)
- Özdemir Çakacak (2004–2007)
- Münir Karaloğlu (2007–2009)
- Aydın Nezih Doğan (2009–2013)
- İbrahim Taşyapan (2013–2015)
- Murat Zorluoğlu (2015–2017)
- Mehmet Emin Bilmez (2017–2018)
- Ozan Balcı (2022–)

== See also ==
- Governor (Turkey)
- Van Province
- Ministry of the Interior (Turkey)
