= Nevzat Tandoğan =

Turkish politician

Abdullah Nevzat Tandoğan
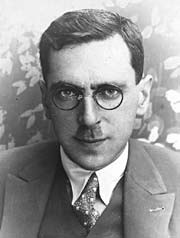

Governor of Ankara
- In office 1929–1946
- Preceded by: Mehmet Akif Bey
- Succeeded by: Osman Sabri Adal

Deputy of Konya
- In office 1927–1929

Governor of Malatya
- In office 1925–1927
- Preceded by: Asım Bey (Sirel)
- Succeeded by: Nazmi Toker

Personal details
- Born: 1894 Istanbul, Ottoman Empire
- Died: 9 July 1946 (aged 52) Ankara, Turkey
- Party: Republican People's Party (CHP)
- Education: Istanbul University Faculty of Law
- Occupation: Teacher, police chef, civil servant, politician

Abdullah Nevzat Tandoğan (1894 – 9 July 1946) was the fourth mayor and governor of Ankara serving between 1929 and 1946. He committed suicide upon a political scandal he was involved in.

== Early life and career ==
Abdullah Nevzat was born into a wealthy family in 1894 at Istanbul, then Ottoman Empire. His father was from Sarajevo and his mother from Belgrade.

He completed his education in Istanbul Law School, today Istanbul University Faculty of Law. After the Surname Law was enacted in Turkey in 1934, he adopted the family name Tandoğan. He was married, and had two children.

During World War I, he served as an intelligence officer in the Ottoman Army in Istanbul. In the later years of the war, he began a career as a school teacher in Istanbul. In 1918, he entered police service. After serving at leading posts in various police departments, he quit. He became Governor of Malatya in 1925 before he entered politics from the Republican People's Party (CHP) and was elected into the Grand National Assembly as deputy of Konya in the 1927 general election.

== Mayor and Governor of Ankara ==
On 4 November 1929 he resigned from his parliamentary seat to take office as Governor of Ankara. Serving also as the acting city mayor, he was uninterrupted 17 years long in this position . In that time, the office of a province governor was united with the post of the provincial chairman of a party, he served at the same time as the provincial chairman of Republican People's Party (CHP). His long-lasting office term is attributed to his close relation to İsmet İnönü (1884–1973), prime minister (1923–1924, 1925–1937), president (1938–1950) and leader of the CHP (1938–1972).

Tandoğan was a civil servant and politician of the single party era (1923–1945). The political philosophy of the era was understood so as "the government has the authority to determine and to do what is useful and best for the country, knowing better than everyone, especially the folk". Tandoğan's political attitude is described best with his words he said to a young man as "We constitute Communism in this country if it is necessary".

Tandoğan had a dissenting opinion to the 1929 Jansen Plan by German architect and urban planner Hermann Jansen (1869–1945). The plan proposed the integration of green belts and areas within the rapid-growing new capital of the newly established Republic for promoting a healthy urban environment. The realization of Ankara's master plan as different from the Jansen Plan is his practice.

During his term as governor, he initiated in 1932 a local celebration day on December 27 to commemorate the day of Mustafa Kemal Pasha's first arrival in Ankara in 1919 during the Turkish War of Independence (1919–1923). He commissioned the building of the Güven Monument in Güvenpark, an expensive project at that time, which exceeded the annual budgets of some municipalities. It was wholly his idea to ban people from high streets in the city center, who were not adequately modern clothed. Nevertheless, there are still many cultural traditions of higher civilization in Ankara that were instated with Tandoğan's persistent efforts, such as residents' lining up at bus stops.

== "Ankara Murder" and suicide ==
In 1945, a murder occurred in Ankara, which became known as the "Ankara Murder" (Turkish: Ankara Cinayeti). Tandoğan was accused of intentionally and deliberately covering the murder case, in which Haşmet Orbay, the son of the then Chief of the General Staff Kâzım Orbay, was involved. Tandoğan was summoned to court to testify after the case was discussed in a question time in the parliament.

It was believed that calling a high-ranked civil servant or politician to the witness stand in a court trial was unthinkable during the single party era before 1945. The next day, 9 July 1946, Nevzat Tandoğan committed suicide by shooting himself at home with a firearm. It was speculated that he felt his close friends gave the cold shoulder to him.

== Legacy ==
A main square in Ankara, which hosted many political party rallies and protests, was named in his honor. In 2012, the city council of the metropolitan municipality changed the square's initial name from "Nevzat Tandoğan Square" to "Tandoğan Square". The major reason for the change was the argument, according to which the existence of such a name in the capital city of a country struggling for democracy is inappropriate and for the strict dress code enforced by Tandoğan during his mayorship. After around three years, on 13 April 2015, the name of the square was changed entirely and named "Anadolu Square" (for "Anatolia Square"). The naming of the square as Anadolu Square is argued to be due to the fact that Tandoğan insulted the people of Anatolia by calling them “louts” and considered the people of Anatolia, second-class citizens.

A public park in Batıkent neighborhood of Yenimahalle, Ankara as well as a street in Kavaklıdere neighbourhood of Çankaya, Ankara are also named after him.
