= Yahya Galip Kargı =

Turkish politician

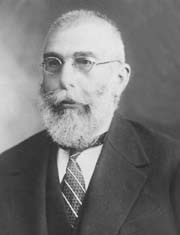

Member of the Grand National Assembly

Personal details
- Born: 1874 Constantinople, Ottoman Empire
- Died: 13 May 1942 (aged 67–68) Istanbul, Turkey

Yahya Galip Kargı (1874, Constantinople – 13 May 1942, Istanbul) was a Turkish politician, member of parliament and public speaker.

== Biography ==
Yahya Galip was born in Istanbul in 1874. After the arrest of the governor of Ankara, Muhittin Pasha, who tried to prevent Mustafa Kemal Atatürk starting his struggle against the Istanbul Government; Yahya Galip Kargı was elected to the governorship of Ankara. During the reception of Mustafa Kemal Atatürk and his delegation on 27 December 1919 in Ankara, he took an active role as governor of Ankara.

He was a member of the parliament for three terms in the Turkish Grand National Assembly from 23 April 1920 to 4 May 1931.
