= Sabahattin Çakmakoğlu =

Turkish bureaucrat and politician (1930–2024)

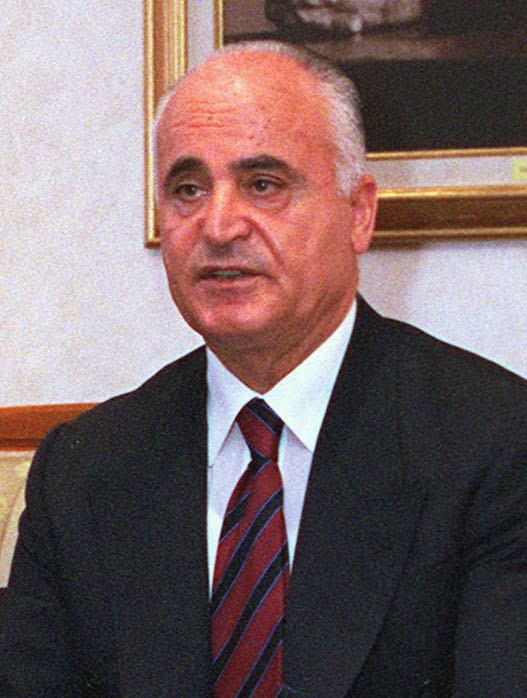
- Çakmakoğlu in 2001

Minister of National Defense
- In office 28 May 1999 – 18 November 2002
- Prime Minister: Bülent Ecevit
- Preceded by: Hikmet Sami Türk
- Succeeded by: Vecdi Gönül

Minister of the Interior
- In office 30 August 1991 – 21 November 1991
- Prime Minister: Mesut Yilmaz
- Preceded by: Mustafa Kalemli
- Succeeded by: İsmet Sezgin

Member of the Grand National Assembly
- In office 22 July 2007 – 12 June 2011
- Constituency: Kayseri (2007)
- In office 18 April 1999 – 3 November 2002
- Constituency: Kayseri (1999)

31st Governor of Mersin
- In office 25 April 1984 – 13 January 1988
- President: Kenan Evren
- Preceded by: Nazif Demiröz
- Succeeded by: Teoman Ünüsan

27th Governor of Gaziantep
- In office 3 December 1979 – 28 October 1980
- President: Fahri Korutürk; Kenan Evren
- Preceded by: Cezmi Kartay
- Succeeded by: Fikret Koçak

27th Governor of Edirne
- In office 16 February 1978 – 11 August 1978
- President: Fahri Korutürk
- Preceded by: Hüsni Özkiper
- Succeeded by: Bekir Öztürk

28th Governor of Isparta
- In office 24 July 1975 – 15 February 1978
- President: Fahri Korutürk
- Preceded by: Tahir Gençağa
- Succeeded by: Orhan Mirkalem

28th Governor of Gümüşhane
- In office 1972–1975
- President: Cevdet Sunay; Fahri Korutürk
- Preceded by: Mahmut Polat
- Succeeded by: Mithat Çekin

Personal details
- Born: 25 November 1930 İncesu, Kayseri, Turkey
- Died: 24 October 2024 (aged 93) Ankara, Turkey
- Party: Motherland Party (1992–1995); Nationalist Movement Party (1995–2024)
- Education: Ankara University, Law School
- Occupation: Bureaucrat, politician

Sabahattin Çakmakoğlu (25 November 1930 – 24 October 2024) was a Turkish bureaucrat and politician who served as the Minister of National Defense from 1999 to 2002. He was the Nationalist Movement Party presidential candidate for the 2007 presidential election, which he lost to the Justice and Development Party candidate Abdullah Gül. He served as a Member of Parliament for the electoral district of Kayseri from 1999 to 2002 and again from 2007 to 2011.

Beginning his career as a bureaucrat, Çakmakoğlu served as the Kaymakam (sub-Governor) of numerous districts before being appointed the Deputy Governor of Ankara. Serving as Deputy Governor for three years, Çakmakoğlu then served as the 28th Governor of Gümüşhane from 1972 to 1975, as the 28th Governor of Isparta from 1975 to 1978, as the 27th Governor of Edirne from February to August 1978, as the 27th Governor of Gaziantep from 1979 to 1980 and finally as the 31st Governor of Mersin from 1984 to 1988. In 1991, he was appointed the non-partisan Minister of the Interior due to the constitutional requirement for the partisan Interior minister to vacate his or her office three months before a general election and hand it over to the Undersecretary of the Interior Ministry. Çakmakoğlu served as the Interior Minister until a new government was formed after the 1991 general election.

== Early life and career ==
Sabahattin Çakmakoğlu was born on 25 November 1930 in İncesu, Kayseri. Having received his primary and secondary education in Kayseri, he graduated from Ankara University Faculty of Political Science in 1953. He became a Civilian Administrative Officer and a candidate to become a Kaymakam (a district governor, roughly translated as a 'sub-governor'). During his time as a Kaymakam candidate, he also graduated from the Ankara University Faculty of Law.

== Bureaucratic career ==
=== Kaymakam ===
Çakmakoğlu spent 12 years serving as a Kaymakam in the districts of Kozaklı in Nevşehir Province, Gülşehir in Nevşehir Province, Ürgüp in Nevşehir Province, Çıldır in Ardahan Province, Bayburt in Gümüşhane Province and Ereğli in Konya Province. In 1989, the district of Bayburt became a Province in its own right.

=== Governor ===
Çakmakoğlu spent three years serving as the Deputy Governor of Ankara before being appointed as the 28th Governor of Gümüşhane from 1972 to 1975, as the 28th Governor of Isparta from 1975 to 1978, as the 27th Governor of Edirne from February to August 1978, as the 27th Governor of Gaziantep from 1979 to 1980 and finally as the 31st Governor of Mersin from 1984 to 1988.

=== Undersecretary ===
Between the years 1988 and 1992, Çakmakoğlu served in the General Directorate of Security, as the Undersecretary to the Prime Minister of Turkey and as the Undersecretary to the Minister of the Interior. In 1991, he was elected as a member of the Council of Higher Education (YÖK) from the Cabinet office contingency.

In 1992, after retirement, he served as the chief advisor to the President of Turkey, at the time Turgut Özal.

=== Minister of the Interior ===
With the Constitution requiring that the serving partisan Ministers of the Interior, of Transport and of Justice should vacate their position to their respective Undersecretaries at least three months before a general election, Çakmakoğlu took over from Mustafa Kalemli as Minister of the Interior on 30 August 1991, three months before the 1991 general election. He remained as Minister until a new government was formed, being succeeded by İsmet Sezgin when the coalition government between the True Path Party and the Social Democratic Populist Party (SHP) on 21 November 1991.

== Political career ==
Çakmakoğlu first entered politics in 1992 by joining the Motherland Party (ANAP), but left the party to join the Nationalist Movement Party (MHP) in 1995. He served as an advisor to MHP leader Alparslan Türkeş until his death in 1997. On 23 November 1997, Çakmakoğlu was elected to the MHP party council and later became a Deputy Leader of the MHP. He was elected to Parliament as an MHP MP from Kayseri in the 1999 general election.

=== Minister of National Defense ===
Following the 1999 general election, the Democratic Left Party (DSP), the Nationalist Movement Party and the Motherland Party formed a triple coalition government. Çakmakoğlu was subsequently appointed as the Minister of National Defense. He served in the position until 18 November 2002. He lost his seat in the 2002 general election due to the MHP falling below the 10% election threshold necessary to win parliamentary representation.

=== Presidential candidacy ===
The MHP managed to win parliamentary representation once again in the 2007 general election, with Çakmakoğlu again returning as an MP for Kayseri. He became a Deputy Leader of the MHP for a second time shortly after. The general election had been called early due to the parliamentary deadlock caused during the presidential election earlier that year. With the parliamentary process to elect a successor to President Ahmet Necdet Sezer resuming after the general election, the MHP put forward Çakmakoğlu as their presidential candidate. He won 70 votes in the first round, 71 in the second and 70 in the final round, losing to the Justice and Development Party candidate Abdullah Gül.

Çakmakoğlu stepped down as an MP at the 2011 general election.

== Personal life and death ==
Çakmakoğlu was married with two children. He had a secondary school named after him in his hometown of İncesu, Kayseri, namely Vali Sabahattin Çakmakoğlu Ortaokulu (Governor Sabahattin Çakmakoğlu Secondary School). A secondary school with the same name exists in Mersin Province, where Çakmakoğlu served as Governor between 1984 and 1988.

Çakmakoğlu died in Ankara on 24 October 2024, at the age of 93.

== See also ==
- Devlet Bahçeli
- Abdullah Gül
- Turgut Özal
- List of Turkish civil servants

Political offices
Preceded by Mustafa Kalemli	Minister of the Interior; 30 August 1991 – 21 November 1991	Succeeded by İsmet Sezgin
Preceded by Hikmet Sami Türk	Minister of National Defense; 28 May 1999 – 18 November 2002	Succeeded by Vecdi Gönül
