= İbrahim Akın (politician) =

Turkish politician

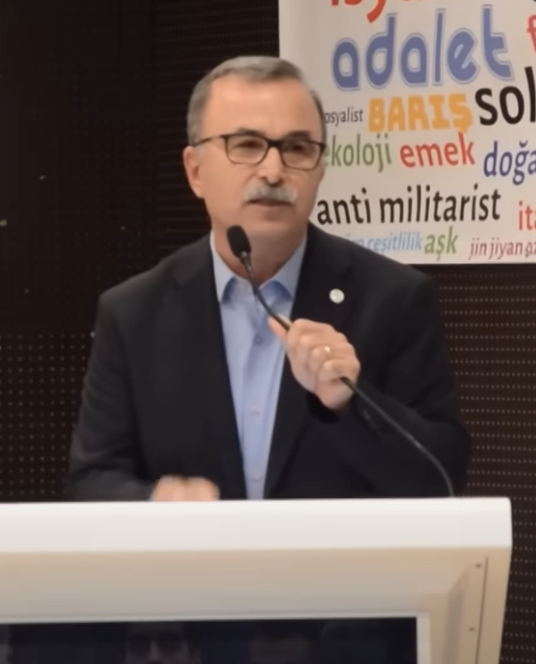
Akın in 2023

İbrahim Akın is a Turkish politician who is co-leader of the Party of the Greens and the Left Future. He was elected to the Grand National Assembly of Turkey from İzmir 2nd district in the 2023 Turkish parliamentary election.
