= Governor (Turkey) =

Turkish political position

In Turkey, a governor (Turkish: Vali) is an official responsible for the implementation of legislation, constitutional and government decisions in individual provinces. There are 81 governors in Turkey, one for each province, appointed ceremonially by the president on the recommendation of the Interior Ministry. Governors are legally required to be politically neutral and have power over public offices within their province, including the provincial police force. They also have a certain role in local government, though mayors and councillors are elected to these roles in local elections. The provincial head of security (the police force) also concurrently serves as deputy governor.

The Kaymakam (roughly translated as 'sub-governor') has similar functions and roles as the governor but operates on a district level.

== Appointment ==
The governor is officially appointed (Turkish: atanma) by the president of Turkey. The Ministry of the Interior first presents their candidate for approval to the president. The president then formally appoints the candidate as the governor of a province.

=== Term limits ===
There are no set term limits for governors, although they can be removed from their position at the will of the Interior Ministry. Governors can also be moved from province to province, meaning that it is not unusual for governors to be appointed to a province in which they have no prior experience or personal connection.

== Functions ==
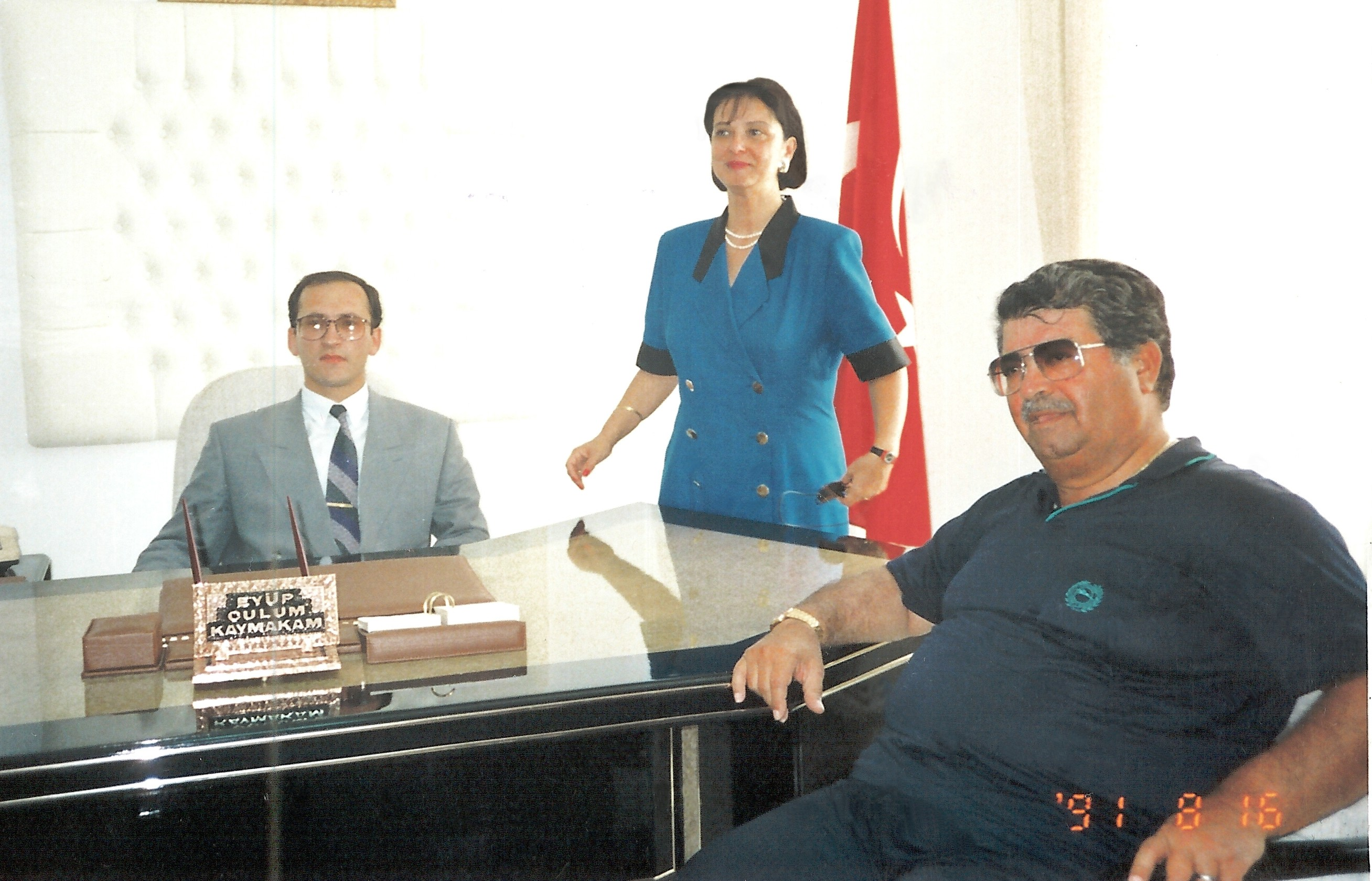
Lale Aytaman (Muğla), the first of the only three female governors to ever be appointed in the history of the Turkish Republic, with former president Turgut Özal in 1991

Governors are mainly tasked with the implementation of government legislation and decisions, meaning that they are senior members of the civil service.

=== Ceremonial ===
During ceremonies or formal national holiday celebrations, the governor of a province serves as the most senior state official during provincial events unless a national state official (such as the president) is in attendance. The governor presides over the celebrations and formally accepts any awards presented during a ceremony.

=== Civil service ===
One of the most important functions of a governor is to make sure decisions, constitutional requirements and new legislation are implemented within the province over which they preside. They are also tasked with the implementation of any demands of government ministries. In the event that legislation cannot be directly or practically implemented, the governor is responsible for bringing about the conditions in which new legislation is compatible with their province.

The governor's powers are decided by government legislation and have the right to issue a 'general command' to implement government decisions, legislation and constitutional requirements.

=== Local government ===
Governors have the right to both supervise and reorganise local government positions, which include district and metropolitan municipalities as well as municipal and provincial councillors. Although local elections are held every five years to elect mayors and councillors, the governor (who is unelected) has the right to inspect the proceedings of local administrations as well as conduct any reorganisations that may be deemed necessary. Any legislative changes to local government (such as the 2013 local government reorganisation) are also implemented by the governor.

=== Command over public institutions ===
The governor has the right to preside over any matters of state that are not already covered by public institutions within a province, or any matters that do not have an assigned public official to deal with them. The governor can also request public institutions or officials to perform tasks that are related to their aims and purpose if a public institution dealing with said tasks is not available in a province.

The governor has the right to appoint and move some public officials from their positions, as well as provide them his or her own personal viewpoint on certain matters. The governor, as mentioned above, can redetermine the remit and the positions of some public officials within a province.

=== Provincial security ===
The governor is the highest level of provincial command of both the police forces and the Gendarmerie. The deputy governor concurrently serves as the head of provincial security, who in turn commands both the head of the provincial police force and the head of the provincial Gendarmerie (A colonel). To maintain peace and security, a governor has the right to take certain decisions intended to stop civil disobediences.

=== Supergovernor ===
From July 1987 to 2002 there existed the position of a supergovernor in the OHAL region (Governorship of Region in State of Emergency) with extra powers to resettle whole villages. He supervised the provincial governors of up to 13 provinces mainly populated by Kurds. From 1990 on he was able to coordinate the actions between the provincial governors.

== Controversies ==
Since governors are appointed by the government, there have been concerns over whether governors can truly be neutral. This is because they are appointed by a partisan government. Several politicians that have become government ministers, such as Efkan Ala and Vecdi Gönül, have previously served as governors of multiple provinces. Furthermore, governors have been accused on numerous occasions of acting with bias in favour of the government. İzmir Mayor Aziz Kocaoğlu accused the governor of İzmir of campaigning for the Justice and Development Party during the 2014 local elections. Governors in Hakkari and Denizli were also accused of forcing public employees to attend President Recep Tayyip Erdoğan's controversial 'public opening' rallies before the June 2015 general election. In 2015, the Peoples' Democratic Party issued a manifesto pledge to introduce elections for governors, rather than appointing them through the Interior Ministry.

== Central governors ==
Besides the 81 provincial governors, some governors who have previously served in a province may be reassigned as a 'central governor' (Turkish: Merkez Valisi). This post does not carry with it any active responsibilities and is effectively a means of terminating a governor's term without withdrawing their privileges or suspending their pay (though their wages are reduced in comparison to provincial governors). The 'centre' (merkez) refers to the Ministry of the Interior, where a central governor is given a small office but have no role until they are reassigned to govern a province. Central governors may visit the Interior Ministry whenever they wish. However, central governors may be given special tasks should the Interior Minister deem it necessary. Previously, it was possible for a governor to legal contest their reassignment from a provincial to a central governor in an attempt to remain in an active gubernatorial role, though this privilege has since been removed.

There are currently around 99 central governors, though this number changes frequently along with re-organisation decrees issued by the government.

== List of current governors ==
Province	Governor	Term start
Adana	Mustafa Yavuz	19 January 2026
Adıyaman	Abdullah Küçük	7 May 2026
Afyonkarahisar	Dr. Naci Aktaş	27 February 2026
Ağrı	Dr. Önder Bozkurt	20 January 2026
Aksaray	Murat Duru	16 January 2026
Amasya	Önder Bakan	25 September 2024
Ankara	Yakup Canbolat	4 May 2026
Antalya	Hulusi Şahin	17 August 2023
Ardahan	Mehmet Fatih Çiçekli	14 January 2026
Artvin	Turan Ergün	25 September 2024
Aydın	Dr. Osman Varol	8 May 2026
Balıkesir	İsmail Ustaoğlu	18 August 2023
Bartın	Dr. Nurtaç Arslan	18 May 2022
Batman	Ekrem Canalp	20 May 2022
Bayburt	Mustafa Eldivan	18 August 2023
Bilecik	Faik Oktay Sözer	3 June 2025
Bingöl	Dr. Cahit Çelik	16 January 2026
Bitlis	Ahmet Karakaya	26 September 2024
Bolu	Abdulaziz Aydın	25 September 2024
Burdur	Tülay Baydar Bilgihan	16 January 2026
Bursa	Erol Ayyıldız	20 August 2024
Çanakkale	Ömer Toraman	25 September 2024
Çankırı	Hüseyin Çakırtaş	19 January 2026
Çorum	Ali Çalgan	18 August 2023
Denizli	Yavuz Selim Köşger	16 January 2026
Diyarbakır	Selçuk Aslan	16 January 2026
Düzce	Mehmet Makas	16 January 2026
Edirne	Yunus Sezer	10 August 2023
Elazığ	Numan Hatipoğlu	25 September 2024
Erzincan	Hamza Aydoğdu	18 August 2023
Erzurum	Aydın Baruş	25 February 2026
Eskişehir	Erdinç Yılmaz	21 January 2026
Gaziantep	Kemal Çeber	26 June 2023
Giresun	Mustafa Koç	15 January 2026
Gümüşhane	Cevdet Atay	26 February 2026
Hakkâri	İbrahim Taşyapan	19 February 2026
Hatay	Mustafa Masatlı	19 August 2023
Iğdır	Mustafa Fırat Taşolar	19 January 2026
Isparta	Abdullah Erin	25 September 2024
Istanbul	Davut Gül	8 June 2023
İzmir	Süleyman Elban	18 August 2023

Province	Governor	Term start
Kahramanmaraş	Mükerrem Ünlüer	18 August 2023
Karabük	Oktay Çağatay	16 January 2026
Karaman	Hayrettin Çiçek	16 January 2026
Kars	Hacı Bekir Toprak	16 January 2026
Kastamonu	Meftun Dallı	18 August 2023
Kayseri	Gökmen Çiçek	18 May 2022
Kilis	Ömer Kalaylı	19 January 2026
Kırıkkale	Hüseyin Engin Sarıibrahim	19 January 2026
Kırklareli	Ugur Turan	26 September 2024
Kırşehir	Murat Sefa Demiryürek	25 September 2024
Kocaeli	İlhami Aktaş	25 September 2024
Konya	Ibrahim Akin	25 September 2024
Kütahya	Musa Işın	18 August 2023
Malatya	Engin Sarıibrahim	19 January 2026
Manisa	Vahdettin Özkan	25 September 2024
Mardin	Tuncay Akkoyun	18 August 2023
Mersin	Atilla Toros	12 February 2025
Muğla	İdris Akbıyık	18 August 2023
Muş	Avni Çakır	18 August 2023
Nevşehir	Hüseyin Kök	29 April 2026
Niğde	Nedim Akmeşe	19 January 2026
Ordu	Muammer Erol	18 August 2023
Osmaniye	Mehmet Fatih Serdengeçti	16 January 2026
Rize	İhsan Selim Baydaş	18 August 2023
Sakarya	Rahmi Doğan	25 September 2024
Samsun	Orhan Tavlı	18 August 2023
Siirt	Dr. Kemal Kızılkaya	18 August 2023
Sinop	Mustafa Özarslan	18 August 2023
Sivas	Yılmaz Şimşek	18 May 2022
Şanlıurfa	Hasan Şıldak	18 August 2023
Şırnak	Birol Ekici	19 September 2024
Tekirdağ	Recep Soytürk	18 August 2023
Tokat	Abdullah Köklü	25 September 2024
Trabzon	Tahir Şahin	15 January 2026
Tunceli	Şefik Aygöl	3 June 2025
Uşak	Serdar Kartal	27 February 2026
Van	Ozan Balcı	18 May 2022
Yalova	Ahmet Hamdi Usta	20 January 2026
Yozgat	Mehmet Ali Özkan	18 August 2023
Zonguldak	Osman Hacıbektaşoğlu	18 August 2023

=== Recent changes ===
The government usually appoints or moves serving governors to different positions through cabinet decrees. Notable decrees are listed below.

Date	Decree №	Governors affected
1 August 2012	2012/3511	40
3 May 2013	2013/4699	24
2 August 2013	2013/5197	25
13 February 2014	2014/5916	14
21 May 2014	2013/6366	31
15 September 2014	2014/6780	31
16 February 2015	2015/7295	17
3 August 2015	2015/7991	4
