= Memduh Oğuz =

Turkish bureaucrat

45th Governor of Isparta
- In office December 15, 2010 – August 3, 2013
- President: Abdullah Gül; Recep Tayyip Erdoğan
- Preceded by: Ali Haydar Öner
- Succeeded by: Vahdettin Özkan

36th Governor of Kırklareli
- In office September 26, 1999 – July 28, 2000
- President: Süleyman Demirel; Ahmet Necdet Sezer
- Preceded by: Kemal Önal
- Succeeded by: Ali Serindağ

29th Governor of Kocaeli
- In office 1996–1999
- President: Süleyman Demirel
- Preceded by: Kemal Nehrozoğlu
- Succeeded by: İbrahim Kemal Önal

37th Governor of Tekirdağ
- In office 1991–1992
- President: Turgut Özal
- Preceded by: Lütfi Fikret Tuncel
- Succeeded by: Şenol Engin

34th Governor of Burdur
- In office August 15, 1988 – August 20, 1991
- President: Kenan Evren; Turgut Özal
- Preceded by: İsmail Günindi
- Succeeded by: Mustafa Bahrettin Demirer

Personal details
- Born: August 9, 1948 (age 78) Nevşehir, Turkey
- Spouse: Canan Oguz
- Children: Fatih Oguz, Esq.; Guven Oguz
- Education: Istanbul University School of Law
- Occupation: Bureaucrat

Memduh Oğuz (born 1948) is a Turkish retired bureaucrat who served as the 45th governor of Isparta between 2010 and 2013, the 36th governor of Kırklareli between 1999 and 2000, the 29th governor of Kocaeli between 1996 and 1999, the 37th governor of Tekirdağ between 1991 and 1992 and as the 36th governor of Burdur between 1988 and 1991. He is a former Kaymakam (district governor). He completed the Governors’ Liaison Program in the U.S. by the National Governors’ Association in 1989. Suleyman Demirel University awarded him an honorary doctorate degree in 2013.

== Early life ==
Memduh Oğuz was born in 1948 in Nevşehir, Cappadocia. He has two brothers, Prof. Aytekin Oguz, MD and Gultekin Oguz. After high school education in Nevsehir High School, he graduated from Istanbul University School of Law. He began working in the civil service as a candidate to become a Kaymakam (district governor) in 1970. He married Canan Oguz in 1973. He has two sons, Fatih Oguz, Esq. and Guven Oguz.

== Career ==
=== Civil service ===
Oğuz served as the Kaymakam of the districts of Avanos, Çayeli, Afşin, Derinkuyu, Dicle and Hayrabolu before being appointed as the 36th Governor of Burdur in 1988. He served until 1991, after which he served as the 37th Governor of Tekirdağ between 1991 and 1992, the 29th Governor of Kocaeli between 1996 and 1999, the 36th Governor of Kırklareli between 1999 and 2000 and finally as the 45th Governor of Isparta between 2010 and 2013. He subsequently retired from the civil service.

=== Political career ===
Oğuz briefly served as the mayor of Hayrabolu for two years during 1980-1982.

== See also ==
- Governor (Turkey)
- List of Turkish civil servants
- Ministry of the Interior (Turkey)
