= Governor of Niğde =

Governor of a Turkish Province

Governor of Niğde Niğde Valiliği
- Logo of the Governor of Niğde
- Incumbent; Nedim Akmese since January 19, 2026
- Appointer: President of Turkey; On the recommendation of the Turkish government
- Term length: No set term length or limit
- Inaugural holder: Asım Bey; October 23, 1921
- Website: Office of the Governor

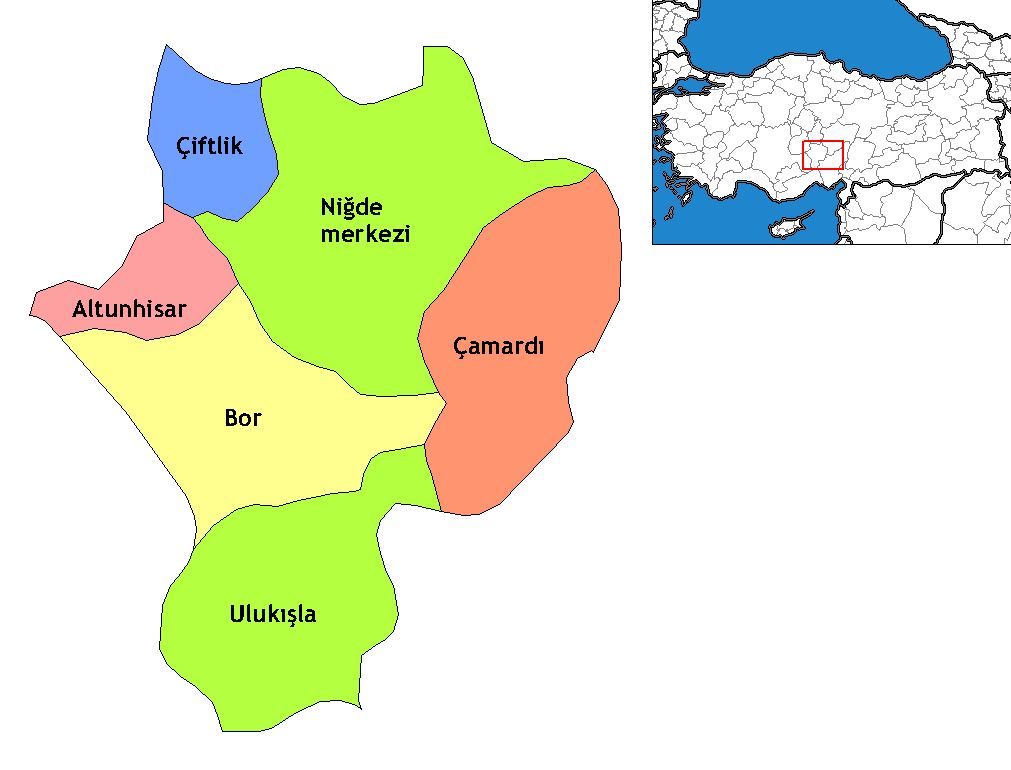
Map of the Province of Niğde, showing the provincial districts.

Governor of Niğde (Turkish: Niğde Valiliği) is the Civil service official responsible for both national government and state affairs in the Province of Niğde. Similar to the Governors of the 80 other Provinces of Turkey, the Governor of Niğde is appointed by the Government of Turkey and is responsible for the implementation of government legislation within Niğde. The Governor is also the most senior commander of both the Niğde provincial police force and the Niğde Gendarmerie.

== Appointment ==
The Governor of Niğde is appointed by the President of Turkey, who confirms the appointment after recommendation from the Turkish Government. The Ministry of the Interior first considers and puts forward possible candidates for approval by the cabinet. The Governor of Niğde is therefore not a directly elected position and instead functions as the most senior civil servant in the province of Niğde.

=== Term limits ===
The Governor is not limited by any term limits and does not serve for a set length of time. Instead, the Governor serves at the pleasure of the Government, which can appoint or reposition the Governor whenever it sees fit. Such decisions are again made by the cabinet of Turkey. The Governor of Niğde, as a civil servant, may not have any close connections or prior experience in Niğde Province. It is not unusual for Governors to alternate between several different Provinces during their bureaucratic career.

== Functions ==
The Governor of Niğde has both bureaucratic functions and influence over local government. The main role of the Governor is to oversee the implementation of decisions by government ministries, constitutional requirements and legislation passed by Grand National Assembly within the provincial borders. The Governor also has the power to reassign, remove or appoint officials a certain number of public offices and has the right to alter the role of certain public institutions if they see fit. Governors are also the most senior public official within the Province, meaning that they preside over any public ceremonies or provincial celebrations being held due to a national holiday. As the commander of the provincial police and Gendarmerie forces, the Governor can also take decisions designed to limit civil disobedience and preserve public order. Although mayors of municipalities and councillors are elected during local elections, the Governor has the right to re-organise or to inspect the proceedings of local government despite being an unelected position.

== List of governors of Niğde ==
- Asım Sirel (1924–1925)
- Salih Cemal Gülen (1925)
- Hüsnü Bey (1926–1931)
- Sakıp Beygo (1931–1933)
- Osman Nuri Tekeli (1933–1936)
- Faik Üstün (1936–1939)
- İsmail Sefa Apaydın (1939–1942)
- Eşref Erkut (1942–1945)
- Rifat Şahinbaş (1945–1946)
- Şefik San (1946–1948)
- Ahmet Demir (1948–1950)
- Fevzi Karakülah (1950–1951)
- Ali Rıza Yaradanakul (1951–1952)
- Eşref Ayhan (1952–1954)
- Sait Kemalî Atay (1954–1955)
- Hadi Ömür (1955–1958)
- Sadık Erdem (1958–1960)
- Yakup Yücel (1960)
- Sadi Kâzım Süer (1960–1961)
- Cezmi Kartay (1961–1962)
- Ahmet Sadullah Verel (1962–1964)
- Mehmet Aldan (1964–1966)
- Ali Rıza Yaradanakul (1966–1968)
- Fahri Centel (1968–1970)
- Mustafa Kemal Demirtaş (1970–1972)
- Sabahattin Çakmakoğlu (1972–1975)
- Fikret Turgut Sayın (1975–1978)
- Yılmaz Ergun (1978–1979)
- Kenan Güven (1979–1981)
- Hasan Bamyacı (1981–1985)
- M. İlyas Aksoy (1985–1991)
- Adnan Darendeliler (1991–1992)
- İsmet Metin (1992–1996)
- Ahmet Rıfat Kaplan (1996–2000)
- Lütfullah Bilgin (2000–2003)
- Refik Arslan Öztürk (2003–2006)
- Alper Tanrısever (2006–2008)
- Sebahattin Öztürk (2008–2009)
- Âlim Barut (2009–2014)
- Necmeddin Kılıç (2014–2016)
- Ertan Peynircioğlu (2016–2017)
- Yılmaz Şimşek (2017–2022)
- Mustafa Koç (2022–2023)
- Dr. Cahit Çelik (2023–2026)
- Nedim Akmeşe (2026–)

== See also ==
- Governor (Turkey)
- Niğde Province
- Ministry of the Interior (Turkey)
