= Governor of Burdur =

Governor of a Turkish Province

Governor of Burdur Burdur Valiliği
- Logo of the Governor of Burdur
- Incumbent; Tülay Baydar Bilgihan since January 16, 2026
- Appointer: President of Turkey On the recommendation of the Turkish government
- Term length: No set term length or limit
- Inaugural holder: Sefa Apaydın; November 30, 1921
- Website: Office of the Governor

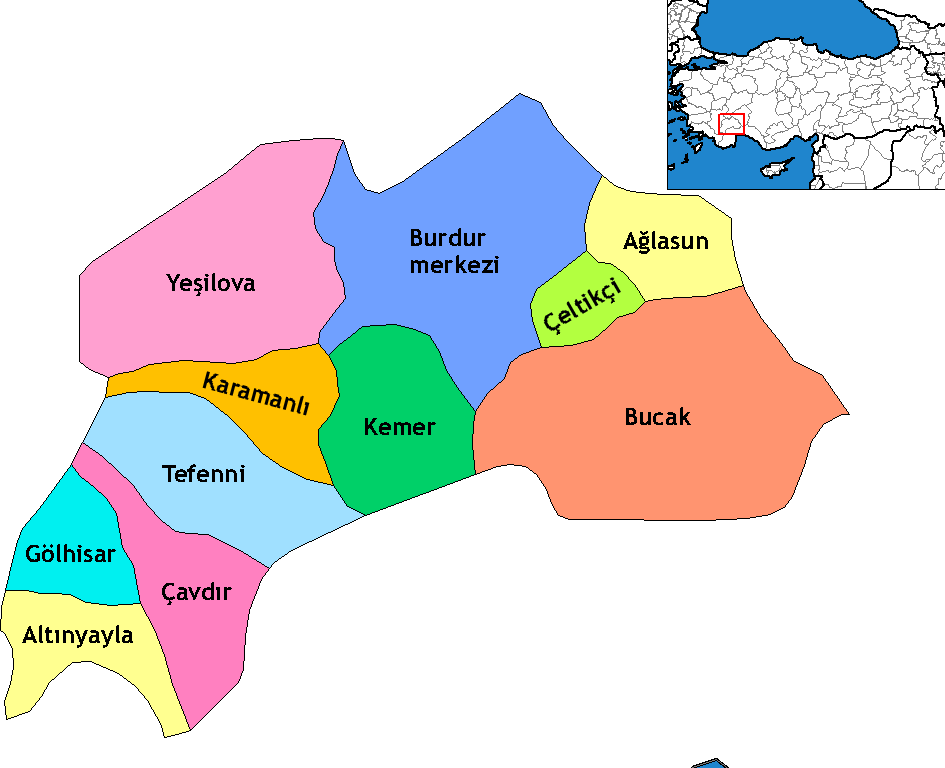
Map of the Province of Burdur, showing the provincial districts.

The Governor of Burdur (Turkish: Burdur Valiliği) is the bureaucratic state official responsible for both national government and state affairs in the Province of Burdur. Similar to the Governors of the 80 other Provinces of Turkey, the Governor of Burdur is appointed by the Government of Turkey and is responsible for the implementation of government legislation within Burdur. The Governor is also the most senior commander of both the Burdur provincial police force and the Burdur Gendarmerie.

== Appointment ==
The Governor of Burdur is appointed by the President of Turkey, who confirms the appointment after recommendation from the Turkish Government. The Ministry of the Interior first considers and puts forward possible candidates for approval by the cabinet. The Governor of Burdur is therefore not a directly elected position and instead functions as the most senior civil servant in the Province of Burdur.

=== Term limits ===
The Governor is not limited by any term limits and does not serve for a set length of time. Instead, the Governor serves at the pleasure of the Government, which can appoint or reposition the Governor whenever it sees fit. Such decisions are again made by the cabinet of Turkey. The Governor of Burdur, as a civil servant, may not have any close connections or prior experience in Burdur Province. It is not unusual for Governors to alternate between several different Provinces during their bureaucratic career.

== Functions ==
The Governor of Burdur has both bureaucratic functions and influence over local government. The main role of the Governor is to oversee the implementation of decisions by government ministries, constitutional requirements and legislation passed by Grand National Assembly within the provincial borders. The Governor also has the power to reassign, remove or appoint officials a certain number of public offices and has the right to alter the role of certain public institutions if they see fit. Governors are also the most senior public official within the Province, meaning that they preside over any public ceremonies or provincial celebrations being held due to a national holiday. As the commander of the provincial police and Gendarmerie forces, the Governor can also take decisions designed to limit civil disobedience and preserve public order. Although mayors of municipalities and councillors are elected during local elections, the Governor has the right to re-organise or to inspect the proceedings of local government despite being an unelected position.

== List of governors of Burdur ==
- Ali Ulvi Bey
- İsmail Sefa Apaydın (1921–1923)
- Faik Üstün (1924)
- Mahmut Celal Berker (1925–1927)
- Süreyya Yurdakul (1928–1929)
- Hazım Bey (1929–1934)
- Saip Okay (1934–1935)
- Abdülak Savaş (1935–1939)
- Sadri Akay (1939–1942)
- Haluk Nihat Pepeyi (1942)
- Kamuran Çuhruk (1942–1944)
- Nuri Atay (1944–1945)
- Rebii Karatekin (1945–1947)
- Feyyaz Bosut (1947–1949)
- Şevket Özanalp (1949–1950)
- Ali Eşref Erkut (1950–1951)
- Mustafa Rauf İnan (1951–1953)
- Enver Saatçigil (1953–1955)
- Ahmet Fevzi Hamurculu (1955–1956)
- M.Ali Çeltik (1956–1957)
- Turhan Kapanlı (1957–1959)
- Ruhi Çalışlar (1959–1960)
- Yusuf Ziya Önder (1960–1961)
- Sadi Kâzım Süer (1961–1963)
- Ahmet Vefik Kitapçıgil (1963–1966)
- Şevket Güres (1966–1970)
- Eşref Ayhan (1970–1971)
- Ömer Naci Bozkurt (1971–1975)
- Mehmet Necat Eldem (1975–1978)
- İhsan Dede (1978)
- A. Kemal Yalçın (1978–1979)
- Recai Tosyalı (1979–1981)
- Ali İhsan Utku (1981–1984)
- M. Nermi Alyanak (1984–1985)
- İsmail Günindi (1985–1988)
- Memduh Oğuz (1988–1991)
- Mustafa Bahrettin Demirer (1991–1992)
- Recai Tosyalı (1992–1996)
- Erhan Tanju (1996–1997)
- Süleyman Oğuz (1997–1999)
- Necati Develioğlu (1999–2000)
- Kaya Uyar (2000)
- Kadir Koçdemir (2000–2003)
- Mustafa Rasih Özbek (2003–2003)
- Can Direkçi (2003–2006)
- Mustafa Rasih Özbek (2006–2008)
- İbrahim Özçimen (2008–2010)
- Süleyman Tapsız (2010–2012)
- Nurettin Yılmaz (2012–2014)
- Hasan Kürklü (2014–2016)
- Şerif Yılmaz (2016–2018)
- Hasan Şıldak (2018–2020)
- Ali Arslantaş (2020–2023)
- Türker Öksüz (2023–2024)
- Ercan Turan (2024–2026)
- Tülay Baydar Bilgihan (2026–)

== See also ==
- Governor (Turkey)
- Burdur Province
- Ministry of the Interior (Turkey)
