= Governor of Ağrı =

Governor of a Turkish Province

Governor of Ağrı Ağrı Valiliği
- Logo of the Governor of Ağrı
- Incumbent; Önder Bozkurt since January 20, 2026
- Appointer: President of Turkey; On the recommendation of the Turkish government
- Term length: No set term length or limit
- Inaugural holder: Halil Kamil Bey; 1922
- Website: Office of the Governor

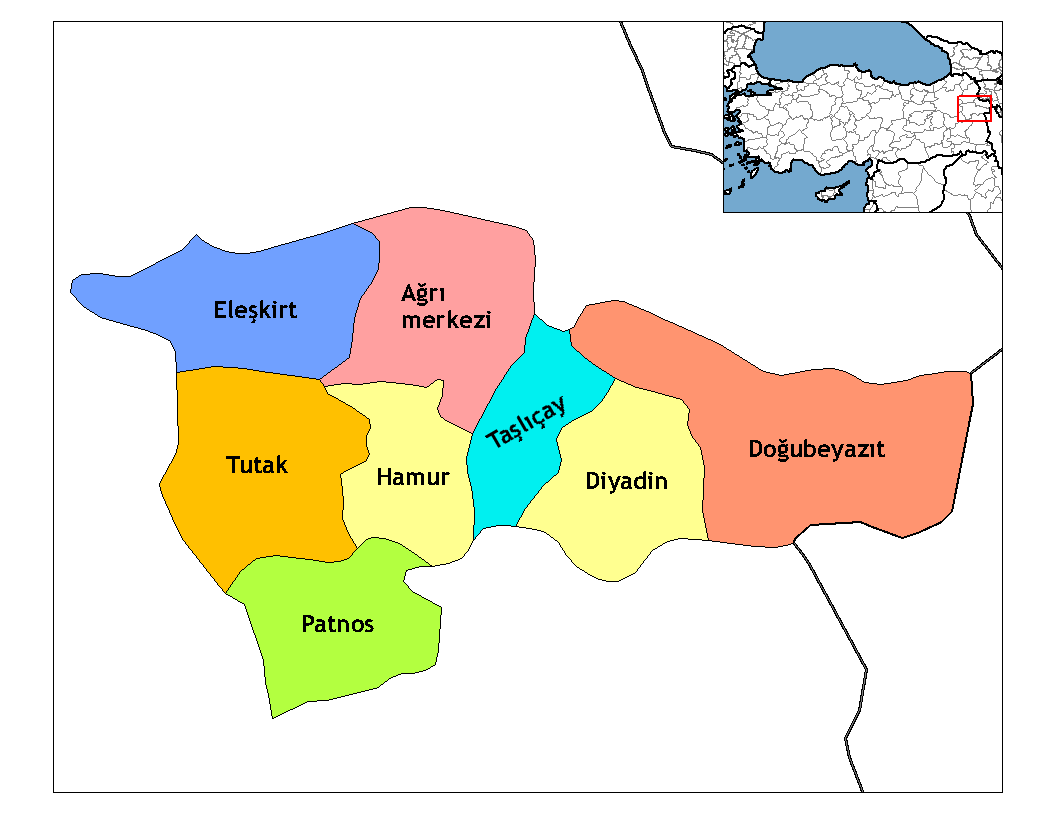
Map of the Province of Ağrı, showing the provincial districts.

The Governor of Ağrı (Turkish: Ağrı Valiliği) is the bureaucratic state official responsible for both national government and state affairs in the Province of Ağrı. Similar to the Governors of the 80 other Provinces of Turkey, the Governor of Ağrı is appointed by the Government of Turkey and is responsible for the implementation of government legislation within Ağrı. The Governor is also the most senior commander of both the Ağrı provincial police force and the Ağrı Gendarmerie.

== Appointment ==
The Governor of Ağrı is appointed by the President of Turkey, who confirms the appointment after recommendation from the Turkish Government. The Ministry of the Interior first considers and puts forward possible candidates for approval by the cabinet. The Governor of Ağrı is therefore not a directly elected position and instead functions as the most senior civil servant in the Province of Ağrı.

=== Term limits ===
The Governor is not limited by any term limits and does not serve for a set length of time. Instead, the Governor serves at the pleasure of the Government, which can appoint or reposition the Governor whenever it sees fit. Such decisions are again made by the cabinet of Turkey. The Governor of Ağrı, as a civil servant, may not have any close connections or prior experience in Ağrı Province. It is not unusual for Governors to alternate between several different Provinces during their bureaucratic career.

== Functions ==
The Governor of Ağrı has both bureaucratic functions and influence over local government. The main role of the Governor is to oversee the implementation of decisions by government ministries, constitutional requirements and legislation passed by Grand National Assembly within the provincial borders. The Governor also has the power to reassign, remove or appoint officials a certain number of public offices and has the right to alter the role of certain public institutions if they see fit. Governors are also the most senior public official within the Province, meaning that they preside over any public ceremonies or provincial celebrations being held due to a national holiday. As the commander of the provincial police and Gendarmerie forces, the Governor can also take decisions designed to limit civil disobedience and preserve public order. Although mayors of municipalities and councillors are elected during local elections, the Governor has the right to re-organise or to inspect the proceedings of local government despite being an unelected position.

== List of governors of Ağrı ==
- Halil Kamil Bey (1922–1926)
- Osman Nuri Tekeli (1926–1927)
- Süreyya Yurdakul (1927–1928)
- İbrahim Ethem Akıncı (1928–1931)
- Mehmet Muhtar Bey (1931–1932)
- Ali Kemali Aksüt (1932–1933)
- Ahmet Rıfat Vona (1933–1934)
- İmadettin Arda (1934–1935)
- Cemal Celal Tüzün (1935–1939)
- Şefik Refik Batur (1939–1940)
- Talat Kaynak (1940–1941)
- Burhanettin Teker (1941–1944)
- Rasihi Kaplan (1944–1945)
- Sıtkı Sahil (1945–1946)
- Şefik Sancar (1946–1949)
- Ekmel Özden (1949–1950)
- Ali Akavcı (1950–1951)
- Ahmet Darendeliler (1951–1953)
- Niyazi Mergen (1953–1955)
- Gafur Soylu (1955–1956)
- Ziya Kıran (1956–1959)
- Şeref Tulug (1959–1960)
- Feyyaz Ataman (1960)
- Fikret Ersan (1960–1962)
- Nihat Oğuz Boran (1962–1964)
- Selahattin Gökdeniz (1964–1966)
- Doğan Hatipoğlu (1966–1968)
- Mecit Sönmez (1968–1970)
- Ahmet Elbeyli (1970–1971)
- Nurettin Yılmaz (1971–1975)
- Ahmet Paftalı (1975–1978)
- Durmuş Yalçın (1978–1979)
- M. Fahri Centel (1979–1980)
- Sabri Özkan (1980–1984)
- Kadir Uysal (1984–1985)
- Recep Kalkan (1985–1988)
- Yusuf Ziya Göksu (1988–1992)
- Lütfü Yiğenoğlu (1992–1997)
- Nuri Okutan (1997–2000)
- Lütfullah Bilgin (2000–2003)
- Hüseyin Yavuz Demir (2003–2007)
- Halil İbrahim Akpınar (2007–2008)
- Mehmet Çetin (2008–2010)
- Ali Yerlikaya (2010–2012)
- Dr. Mehmet Tekinarslan (2012–2015)
- Musa Işın (2015–2017)
- Süleyman Elban (2017–2020)
- Dr. Osman Varol (2020–2023)
- Mustafa Koç (2023–2026)
- Dr. Önder Bozkurt (2026–)

== See also ==
- Governor (Turkey)
- Ağrı Province
- Ministry of the Interior (Turkey)
