= Governor of Tekirdağ =

Governor of a Turkish Province

Governor of Tekirdağ Tekirdağ Valiliği
- Logo of the Governor of Tekirdağ
- Incumbent; Recep Soytürk since August 18, 2023
- Appointer: President of Turkey; On the recommendation of the Turkish government
- Term length: No set term length or limit
- Inaugural holder: İhsan Bey; 1921
- Website: Office of the Governor

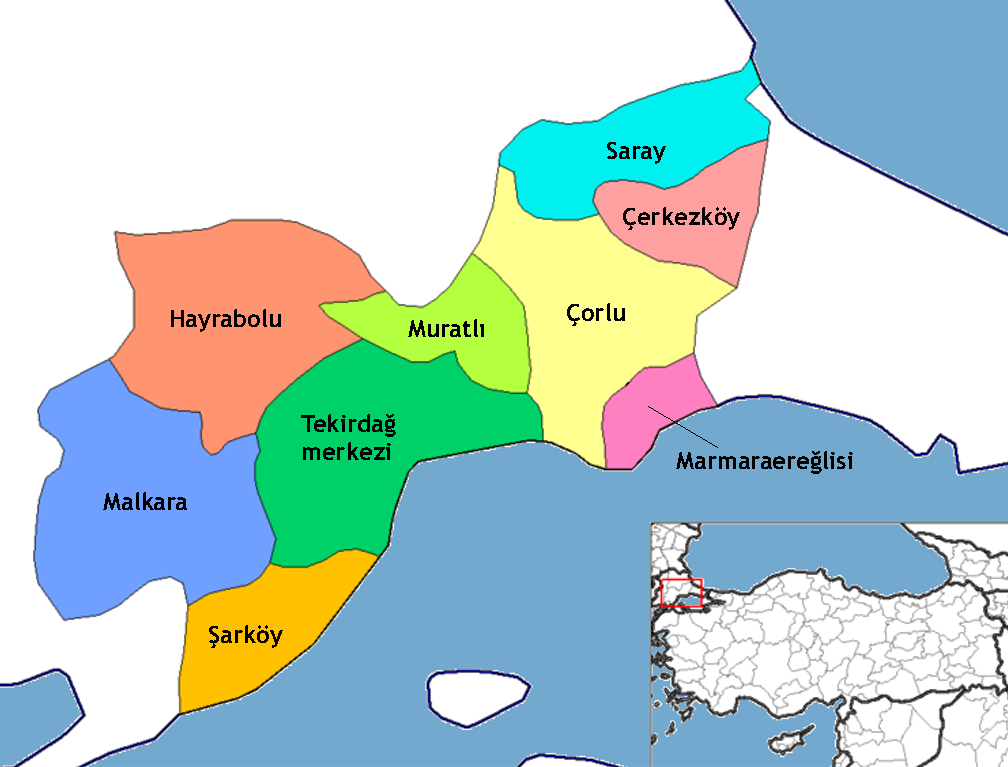
Map of the Province of Tekirdağ, showing the provincial districts.

The Governor of Tekirdağ (Turkish: Tekirdağ Valiliği) is the bureaucratic state official responsible for both national government and state affairs in the Province of Tekirdağ. Similar to the Governors of the 80 other Provinces of Turkey, the Governor of Tekirdağ is appointed by the Government of Turkey and is responsible for the implementation of government legislation within Tekirdağ. The Governor is also the most senior commander of both the Tekirdağ provincial police force and the Tekirdağ Gendarmerie.

== Appointment ==
The Governor of Tekirdağ is appointed by the President of Turkey, who confirms the appointment after recommendation from the Turkish Government. The Ministry of the Interior first considers and puts forward possible candidates for approval by the cabinet. The Governor of Tekirdağ is therefore not a directly elected position and instead functions as the most senior civil servant in the Province of Tekirdağ.

=== Term limits ===
The Governor is not limited by any term limits and does not serve for a set length of time. Instead, the Governor serves at the pleasure of the Government, which can appoint or reposition the Governor whenever it sees fit. Such decisions are again made by the cabinet of Turkey. The Governor of Tekirdağ, as a civil servant, may not have any close connections or prior experience in Tekirdağ Province. It is not unusual for Governors to alternate between several different Provinces during their bureaucratic career.

== Functions ==
The Governor of Tekirdağ has both bureaucratic functions and influence over local government. The main role of the Governor is to oversee the implementation of decisions by government ministries, constitutional requirements and legislation passed by Grand National Assembly within the provincial borders. The Governor also has the power to reassign, remove or appoint officials a certain number of public offices and has the right to alter the role of certain public institutions if they see fit. Governors are also the most senior public official within the Province, meaning that they preside over any public ceremonies or provincial celebrations being held due to a national holiday. As the commander of the provincial police and Gendarmerie forces, the Governor can also take decisions designed to limit civil disobedience and preserve public order. Although mayors of municipalities and councillors are elected during local elections, the Governor has the right to re-organise or to inspect the proceedings of local government despite being an unelected position.

== List of governors of Tekirdağ ==
- Ahmet Faik Bey (1923–1924)
- Cemal Bardakçı (1924–1925)
- Hasan Faiz Ergun (1925–1926)
- İsmail Adil Güven (1926–1929)
- A. Cemal Bardakçı (1929–1933)
- Arif Hikmet Aykaç (1933–1935)
- H. Haydar Berksun (1935–1936)
- Osman Nuri Tekeli (1936–1937)
- Süreyya Yurdakul (1937–1938)
- Ahmet Refik Noyan (1938–1939)
- Ziya Termen (1939–1941)
- Turgut Başkaya (1941–1944)
- Cemal Celal Tüzün (1944–1946)
- Eşref Erkut (1946–1949)
- Nuri Atay (1949–1950)
- Cahit Ortaç (1950–1951)
- Mehmet Hilmi İncesulu (1951–1953)
- Abdullah Zeki Köymen (1953)
- Rıfat Bingöl (1953–1955)
- Şakir Canalp (1955–1956)
- Alaettin Eriş (1956–1958)
- Cenap Aksu (1958–1960)
- Hikmet Baloğlu (1960–1962)
- Mehmet Saraçoğlu (1962–1966)
- Nail Memik (1966–1968)
- Mehmet Aldan (1968–1970)
- Ziya Dönmez (1970–1971)
- Süfyan Emiroğlu (1971–1975)
- Naci Gürcan (1975–1978)
- Kadir Demir (1978–1979)
- Mustafa Gönül (1979–1980)
- Fikret Koçak (1980–1981)
- Refik Arslan Öztürk (1981–1984)
- Arif Atilla Osmançelebioğlu (1984–1987)
- Kamil Demircioğlu (1987–1991)
- Şahabettin Harput (1991–1992)
- Mevlüt Çetinkaya (1992–1996)
- Zeki Şanal (1996–2003)
- Ali Haydar Öner (2003–2006)
- Aydın Nezih Doğan (2006–2009)
- Zübeyir Kemelek (2009–2012)
- Ali Yerlikaya (2012–2015)
- Enver Salihoğlu (2015–2016)
- Mehmet Ceylan (2016–2018)
- Aziz Yıldırım (2018–2023)
- Recep Soytürk (2023–)

== See also ==
- Governor (Turkey)
- Tekirdağ Province
- Ministry of the Interior (Turkey)
