= Sevim Tekeli =

Turkish history of science professor (1924–2019)

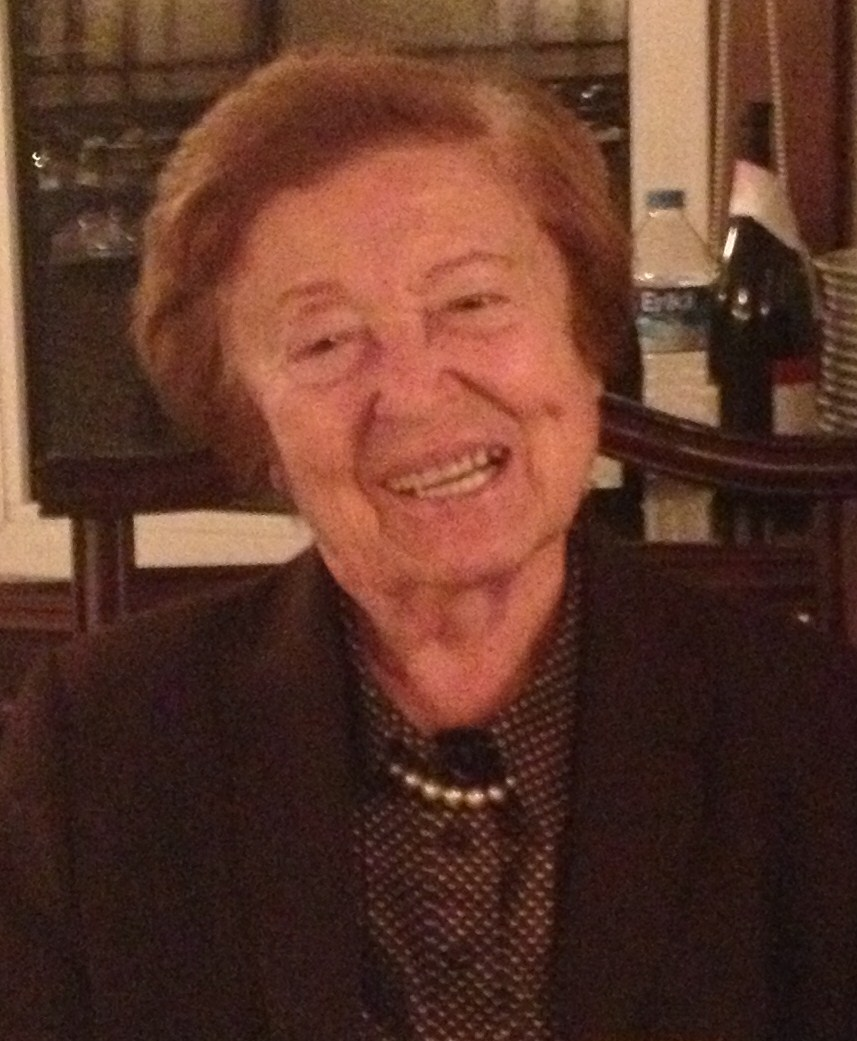
- Prof. Dr. Sevim Tekeli in 2012
- Born: 22 December 1924; İzmir, Turkey
- Died: 16 December 2019 (aged 94); Ankara, Turkey
- Resting place: Ankara
- Citizenship: Turkey
- Education: Ankara University
- Known for: Ottoman astronomy
- Scientific career
- Fields: History of Science and Philosophy
- Workplaces: Ankara University
- Doctoral advisor: Aydın Sayılı

Sevim Tekeli (22 December 1924 – 16 December 2019) was a prominent Turkish history of science professor.

== Early life and education ==
Sevim Tekeli was born in İzmir in 1924. She received primary education in different cities of Turkey, since her father Osman Nuri Tekeli was working as a governor in various provinces. She is a graduate of American Girls' High School of Üsküdar.

She obtained a bachelor of arts degree in philosophy at Ankara University. She was attracted to the history of science during her undergraduate studies under the influence of Aydin Sayili.

== Academic career ==
Sevim Tekeli began her career as a research assistant of Prof. Dr. Aydın Sayılı at the Department of Philosophy in Ankara University in 1952.

== Works ==
Sevim Tekeli's works mainly focus on the history of Ottoman astronomy, particularly on the studied by the famous astronomer Taqi al Din.

When Professor Tekeli started her doctoral studies, it was very hard to find any scientific study and materials in Turkey concerning the history of Ottoman science. She determined to overcome such problems. Eventually, Tekeli overcame all these challenges and completed her doctoral thesis, "The comparison of the observational instruments of Nasir al Din al Tûsî, Tycho Brahe and Taqi al Din", under the supervision of Aydın Sayılı in 1956. Her doctoral thesis in which she made comparisons between Nasir al Din al Tûsî, Tycho Brahe and Taqi al Din in terms of observational instruments they had used was later published with the same title.

She was also interested in the development of scientific endeavour in the 17th century Western Europe and also, in comparing the developments in Russia at the time and in the Ottoman Empire in terms of scientific activities and achievements. She also examined the effects of the Ottoman Empire on Renaissance. She particularly analyzed the reasons behind the superiority and leadership of the Ottoman Empire in the Islamic World at the beginning of the 17th century.

She continued her research on Taqi al Din and published another book, The Brightest Stars of Construction of the Mechanical Clocks that was based on her professorial thesis. In this book, she revealed that Taqi al Din was one of the most important astronomers of the 16th century. She has also studies concerning the map of Piri Reis and Muhyi al Din. She was one of the earliest Turkish scholars uncovering the astronomy activities during the period of Ottomans.

=== Articles ===
Some of her articles are given below:

- (1970). Al Urdi's Article on the Quality of the Observations. Araştırma 8.
- (1980).The Observational Instruments of Istanbul Observatory. Proceedings of the International Symposium on the Observatories in Islam, pp. 33,43.
- (1985). The map of America by Pîrî Reîs. New Dictionary of Scientific Biography.
- (2008). Al-Khujandī, Abū Maḥmūd Ḥāmid Ibn Al-Khiḍr. Complete Dictionary of Scientific Biography.
- (2008). Pirī Rais (or Re’is), Muḥyī Al-Dīn. Complete Dictionary of Scientific Biography.
- (2008). Muḥyi ’L-Dīn Al-Maghribī. Complete Dictionary of Scientific Biography.

=== Books ===
(1975). Modern bilimin doğuşunda Bizansʾın etkisi? = Is there any impact of Byzantine on the emergence of modern science?, First Edition, Ankara: Kalite Publishing.

(1985). İlk Japon haritasını çizen Türk Kaşgarlı Mahmud ve Kristof Kolomb'un haritasına dayanarak en eski Amerika Haritasını çizen Türk Amiralı Piri Reis = The oldest map of Japan drawn by a Turk Mahmud of Kashgar and the map of America by Piri Reis, Ankara: Atatürk Kültür Merkezi.

(2002). 16’ıncı yüzyılda Osmanlılarda saat ve Takiyüddin’in “mekanik saat konstrüksüyonuna dair en parlak yıldızlar = The clocks in Ottoman Empire in 16th century and Taqi al Din’s the brightest stars for the construction of the mechanical clocks. Second edition, Ankara: T. C. Kültür Bakanlıgi.

Tekeli, Sevim et al. (2007). Bilim tarihine giriş = An introduction to the history of science, Ankara: Nobel Publishing.
