= Ali Yerlikaya =

Turkish politician (born 1968)

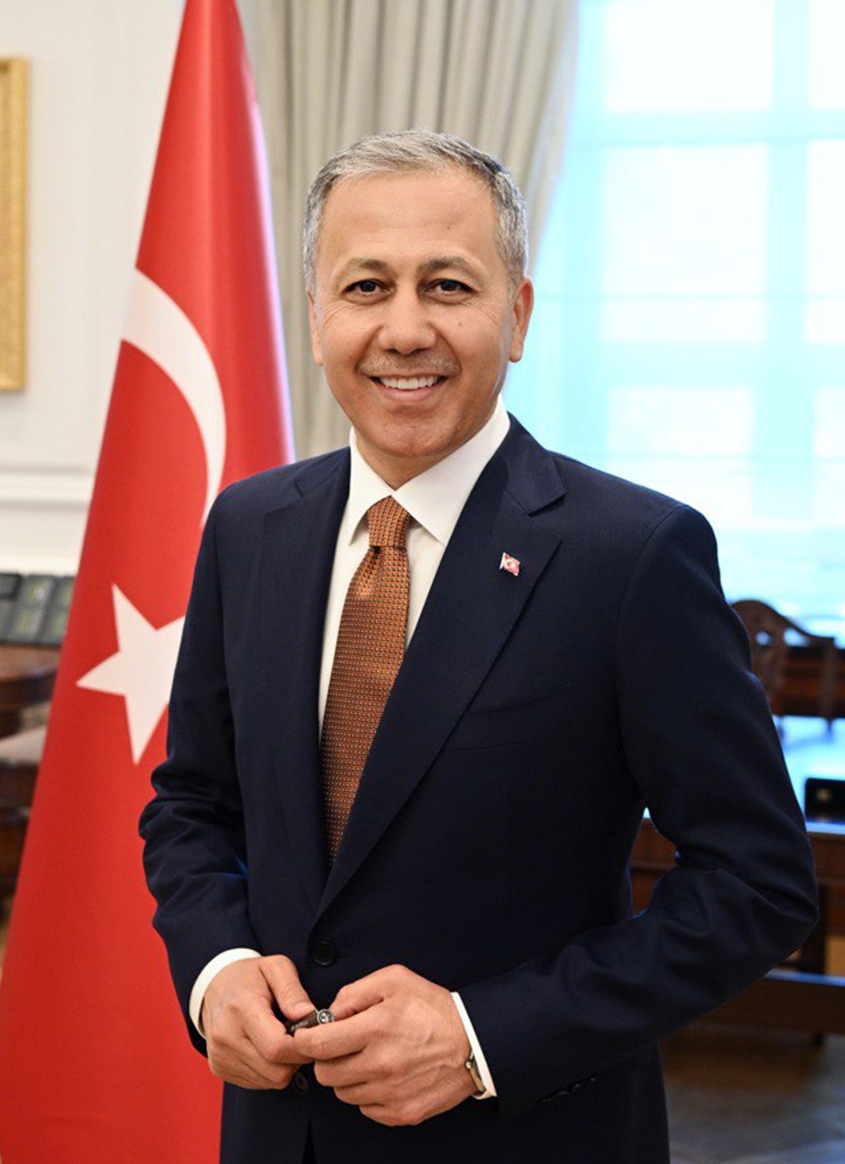
- Yerlikaya in 2023

Minister of the Interior
- In office 4 June 2023 – 11 February 2026
- President: Recep Tayyip Erdoğan
- Preceded by: Süleyman Soylu
- Succeeded by: Mustafa Çiftçi

Governor of Istanbul
- In office 26 October 2018 – 4 June 2023
- President: Recep Tayyip Erdoğan
- Preceded by: Vasip Şahin
- Succeeded by: Davut Gül

Acting Mayor of Istanbul
- In office 6 May 2019 – 27 June 2019
- Preceded by: Ekrem İmamoğlu
- Succeeded by: Ekrem İmamoğlu

Governor of Gaziantep
- In office 19 February 2015 – 26 October 2018
- President: Recep Tayyip Erdoğan
- Preceded by: Erdal Ata
- Succeeded by: Davut Gül

Governor of Tekirdağ
- In office 3 August 2012 – 19 February 2015
- President: Abdullah Gul; Recep Tayyip Erdoğan
- Preceded by: Zübeyir Kemelek
- Succeeded by: Enver Salihoğlu

Governor of Ağrı
- In office 13 May 2010 – 3 August 2012
- President: Abdullah Gul
- Preceded by: Mehmet Çetin
- Succeeded by: Mehmet Tekinarslan

Governor of Şırnak
- In office 30 November 2007 – 13 May 2010
- President: Abdullah Gul
- Preceded by: Osman Güneş
- Succeeded by: Vahdettin Özkan

Personal details
- Born: 11 October 1968 (age 57) Konya, Turkey
- Party: Justice and Development Party
- Children: Emir Yusuf Tomruk Yerlikaya
- Education: Istanbul University (BA)

Ali Yerlikaya (born 11 October 1968) is a Turkish politician, who served as Minister of the Interior in the 67th cabinet of Turkey, until his dismissal on 11 February 2026. He previously served as the Governor of Istanbul from 2018 to 2023.

Following the annulment of the March 2019 Istanbul mayoral election, Yerlikaya was briefly the acting Mayor of Istanbul until a new successor was elected in a re-run in June 2019.

== Early life and career ==
Yerlikaya graduated from the Istanbul University Faculty of Political Science in 1989, with a degree in Public Administration. He began work at the Ministry of the Interior as a candidate to become a Kaymakam (a district governor) in 1990. He served as the Kaymakam for the districts of Felahiye, Erzin, Derabucak, Hilvan and Sarıkaya during his early bureaucratic career.

Yerlikaya also served as a legal advisor to the Ministry of the Interior and the Chief of Staff at the Ministry of Health. He was also an executive board member of the Turkish Heavy Industry and Service Sector Public Employers' Union (TÜHİS).

== Governorships ==
On 30 November 2007, Yerlikaya was made governor of Şırnak. Serving until 13 May 2010, he was appointed as the governor of Ağrı on the same day, serving until 3 August 2012. On 3 August 2012, he was appointed governor of Tekirdağ until 19 February 2015, on which day he became governor of Gaziantep. On 26 October 2018, he became governor of Istanbul until 4 June 2023.

=== Acting Mayor of Istanbul ===
Turkey held routine local elections on 31 March 2019. During the mayoral vote in Istanbul, the opposition Nation Alliance candidate Ekrem İmamoğlu won a surprise victory, edging past government-backed People's Alliance candidate Binali Yıldırım by a narrow 0.2% margin. The government subsequently appealed to the Supreme Electoral Council of Turkey (YSK) for a recount. After several complaints and recounts, İmamoğlu was eventually sworn in as Mayor on 18 April 2019. The YSK, however, accepted a complaint by the People's Alliance for an annulment of the elections on 6 May, thus removing İmamoğlu from his office as Mayor and scheduling fresh elections for 23 June 2019.

As customary when a political position is in doubt, the Ministry of the Interior appointed the city's incumbent governor, namely Yerlikaya, as acting Mayor of Istanbul until the vacancy could be filled by the re-run vote. Yerlikaya, as acting mayor, was criticised for taking decisions that were viewed by the opposition as beyond the remit of a placeholder. He was also criticised for supposedly turning a blind eye to pro-Yıldırım posters and campaigns being conducted by municipal workers, who are required to remain neutral.

İmamoğlu won the re-run with a substantially increased majority, thereby taking over from Yerlikaya.

== Minister of the Interior ==
Since June 2023, he is the Interior minister in the cabinet led by President Recep Tayyip Erdoğan. February 11, 2026, he was succeeded by Mustafa Çiftçi.

== Controversies ==
=== Comments about ISIL ===
While serving as governor of Gaziantep, Yerlikaya made a series of gaffes during statements about captured militants from the Islamic State of Iraq and the Levant (ISIL). On one occasion, he referred to an ISIL militant on trial in a formal manner, using the formal suffix 'bey' after his name (which he also repeated incorrectly). His comments were criticised for supposedly showing ISIL militants respect. Yerlikaya responded by claiming that he had been misunderstood, and that the suspected militant was innocent until proven guilty in court.

On another occasion, he was criticised for commenting on an ISIL suicide bomber in an apparently supportive manner after the bomber had allegedly surrendered to the police. He again rejected criticism, saying that his supportive words had been directed to the police operation.

=== Banning of Beru ===
While serving as governor of Istanbul, he banned Beru, the Kurdish adaption of Dario Fo's play Faceless, shortly before it was to be performed by the theatre company Teatro Jiyana Nû. He reasoned that the play contained propaganda of the Kurdistan Workers' Party (PKK). Before, it had been performed both in Turkey and also abroad without issue.

Political offices
Preceded by Süleyman Soylu	Minister of the Interior; 4 June 2023 – 11 February 2026	Succeeded by Mustafa Çiftçi
Preceded by Vasip Şahin	Governor of Istanbul; 26 October 2018 – 4 June 2023	Succeeded by Davut Gül
