= Mustafa Çiftçi =

Turkish statesperson (born 1970)

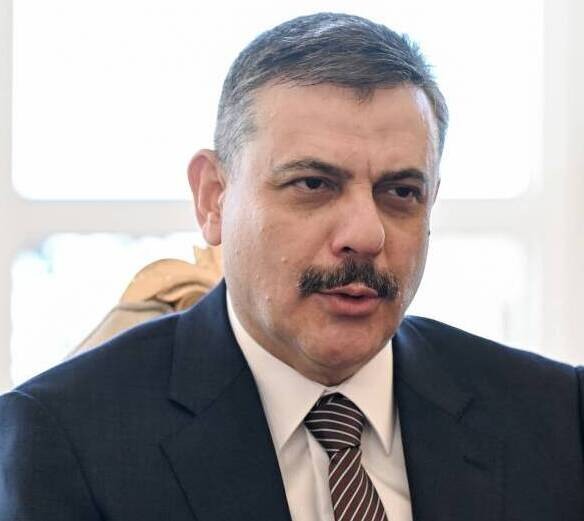
- Çiftçi in 2026

Minister of the Interior
- Incumbent
- Assumed office 11 February 2026
- President: Recep Tayyip Erdoğan
- Preceded by: Ali Yerlikaya

Personal details
- Born: 1970 (age 55–56) Konya, Turkey
- Party: Justice and Development Party

Mustafa Çiftçi (born 1970) is a Turkish bureaucrat and politician, serving as the minister of the interior since 11 February 2026. He previously served as the governor of Erzurum between 2023 and February 2026.

== Early life and education ==
Çiftçi born in 1970 in the Çumra district of Konya, Çiftçi completed his high school education at Konya Imam Hatip High School. He graduated from Ankara University Faculty of Political Sciences in 1995. In 2007, he completed his master's degree at the Department of Public Administration and Political Science at Selçuk University Institute of Social Sciences, and in 2011, he graduated from Ankara University Faculty of Theology. He is currently pursuing his undergraduate education at Ankara University Faculty of Law, where he enrolled in 2018.

== Career ==
He went to England for 8 months in 1998. He graduated from the National Security Academy in 1999. He served as District Governor in Gülağaç (Aksaray), Tekman (Erzurum), Derinkuyu (Nevşehir), Adilcevaz (Bitlis), and Kaman (Kırşehir), and as Department Head at the Ministry of Interior's Personnel General Directorate. He held the positions of Chief of Staff and Senior Advisor to the President at the Grand National Assembly of Turkey. He served as Governor of Çorum from November 6, 2018, to August 9, 2023.

On August 9, 2023, he was appointed Governor of Erzurum. While serving as Governor of Erzurum, he announced that the problem of stray dogs had been solved by rounding up all stray dogs in the province.

He was appointed to the position of Minister of the Interior by a decision published in the Official Gazette dated February 11, 2026, and numbered 33165.

== Political views ==
=== Turkish-Islamic sovereignty over Jerusalem ===
On June 6, 2026, Speaking at an advisory council meeting of the Justice and Development Party (AKP) in Corum province, Çiftçi declared that, just as how Turket witnessed the "liberation" of Damascus, Aleppo and Nagorno-Karabakh, he hopes that Jerusalem would come again under Turkish-Islamic rule. He also prayed for the Turkish sovereignty over Jerusalem: "When I was governor, I had one supplication to Allah … my Lord, one day grant me the governorship of Jerusalem".

== Criticism ==
Çiftçi's career has attracted criticism from secularist and opposition circles in Turkey, particularly over several public statements and controversies regarding religion, the early Turkish Republic and Ottoman history.

In February 2021, while serving as governor of Çorum, Çiftçi attended a commemoration of İskilipli Atıf Hoca, a religious figure who's legacy remains controversial in Turkey because of his opposition to aspects of the early Republic's secular reforms. The event drew criticism from secularist and opposition circles. Çiftçi defended his participation, describing the commemoration as "right, justified and necessary." Criminal complaints were filed in connection with the event, although prosecutors did not open an investigation.

During his tenure as governor of Erzurum, Çiftçi also faced criticism facing concerning the historic building where the Erzurum congress was held in 1919. He temporarily closed the building, citing structural damage and subsequently discussed its previous use as an Armenian school and the possibility and possibility of demolition. Following technical inspection and reinforcement works, the building reopened as a museum. Critics considered the event particularly sensitive because of the building's association with the Turkish national movement and the Erzurum Congress.

Following his appointment as Interior Minister in February 2026, Çiftçi attracted further criticism over remarks concerning Jerusalem. In June 2026, he said that he had long prayed for the opportunity to serve as governor of Jerusalem and expressed his belief that Jerusalem and other territories formally ruled by the Ottoman Empire would eventually again come under Turkish rule. The remarks prompted a strong reaction from Israeli officials, including Defense Minister Israel Katz, who directly criticized Çiftçi's comments.

Çiftçi's comments about Jerusalem were also interpreted by several commentators as reflecting a neo Ottoman or expansionist outlook. Turkish Minute described the controversy as part of broader scrutiny of Çiftçi by secularist and opposition circles over statements and symbolic gestures concerning religion and Turkey's Ottoman and republican past.

Political offices
Preceded by Ali Yerlikaya	Minister of the Interior; 11 February 2026 –	Incumbent
