= Governor of Sivas =

Governor of a Turkish Province

Governor of Sivas Sivas Valiliği
- Logo of the Governor of Sivas
- Incumbent; Yılmaz Şimşek since May 12, 2022
- Appointer: President of Turkey; On the recommendation of the Turkish government
- Term length: No set term length or limit
- Inaugural holder: Halil Rıfat Paşa; January 9, 1882
- Website: Office of the Governor

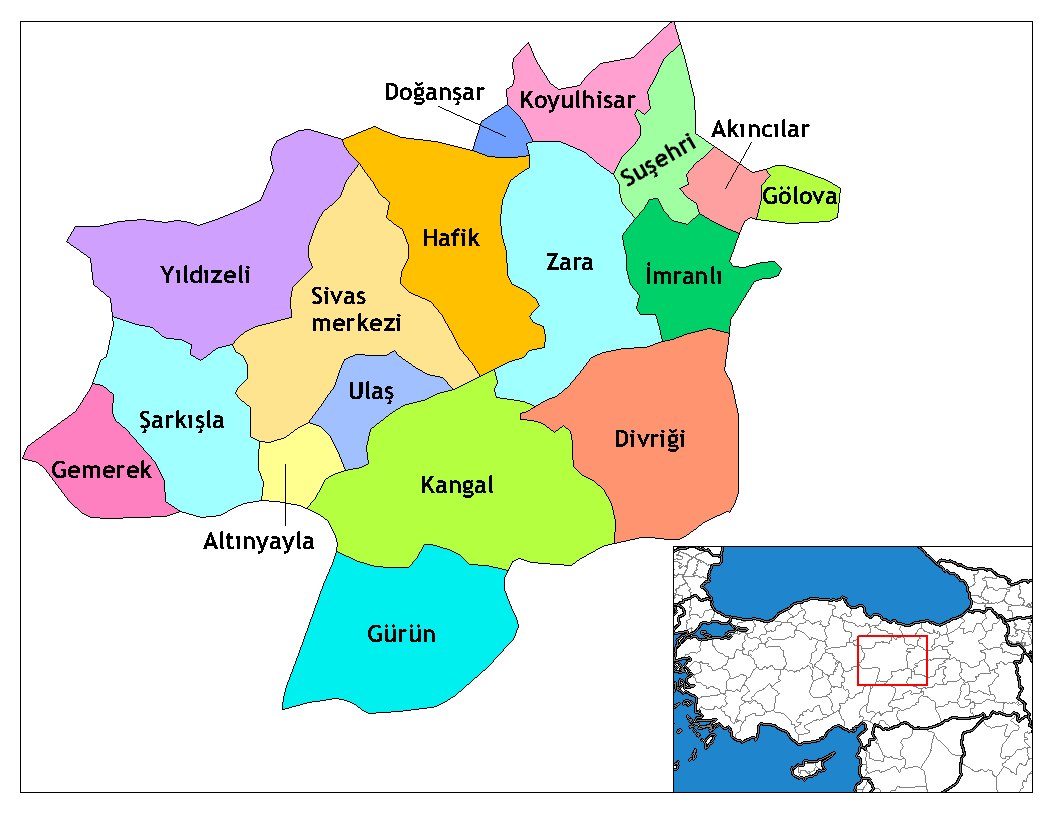
Map of the Province of Sivas, showing the provincial districts.

The Governor of Sivas (Turkish: Sivas Valiliği) is the bureaucratic state official responsible for national government and state affairs in Sivas Province, Turkey. Similar to the governors of the 80 other provinces of Turkey, he is appointed by the Government of Turkey and is responsible for the implementation of government legislation within Sivas. He is also the most senior commander of the provincial police force and Gendarmerie.

== Appointment ==
The Governor of Sivas is appointed by the President of Turkey, who confirms the appointment after recommendation from the Turkish Government. The Ministry of the Interior first considers and puts forward possible candidates for approval by the cabinet. The Governor of Sivas is therefore not a directly elected position and instead functions as the most senior civil servant in Sivas.

=== Term limits ===
The governor is not limited by any term limits and does not serve for a set length of time. Instead, he serves at the pleasure of the government, which can appoint or reposition him whenever it sees fit. Such decisions are again made by the cabinet of Turkey. The Governor of Sivas, as a civil servant, may not have any close connections or prior experience in Sivas Province. It is not unusual for governors to alternate between several different provinces during their bureaucratic career.

== Functions ==
The Governor of Sivas has bureaucratic function in and influence over local government. The main job is oversight of the implementation of decisions by government ministries, constitutional requirements and legislation passed by Grand National Assembly within the provincial borders. He also has the power to reassign, remove or appoint officials a certain number of public offices and has the right to alter the role of certain public institutions as seen fit. Governors are also the most senior public official within the province, meaning that they preside over any public ceremonies or provincial celebrations being held due to a national holiday. As the commander of the provincial police and Gendarmerie forces, the governor can also take decisions designed to limit civil disobedience and preserve public order. Although mayors of municipalities and councillors are elected during local elections, the governor has the right to reorganise or to inspect the proceedings of local government despite being an unelected position.

== List of governors of Sivas ==
- Mümtaz Bey (1923–1925)
- Mehmet Zeki Özener (1925)
- Hilmi Bey (1925–1928)
- Süleyman Sami Kepenek (1928–1935)
- Ali Akif Eyidoğan (1935)
- Hazım Türegün (1935–1936)
- Nazmi Toker (1936–1939)
- Ahmet Refik Noyan (1939–1941)
- Salim Özdemir Günday (1941–1945)
- İihsan Aras (1945–1946)
- Kudret Kantoğlu (1946–1948)
- Mitat Ali Kışlalı (1948–1950)
- Turgut Başkaya (1950–1952)
- Cavit Ortaç (1952–1954)
- Kamil Tuncel (1954–1955)
- Kazım Akdoğan (1955–1957)
- Hasan Basri Çantay (1957–1960)
- Sait Koçak (1960)
- Sedat Kirtetepe (1960–1962)
- Celal Coşkun (1962–1964)
- Ali Rıza Yaradanakul (1964–1966)
- Mustafa Yörükoğlu (1966–1968)
- Sabahattin Çakmakoğlu (1968–1970)
- Fikret Turgut Sayın (1970–1972)
- Nedim Evliya (1972–1975)
- Yüksel Çavuşoğlu (1975–1977)
- Cemal Tekay (1977–1978)
- Yılmaz Ergun (1978–1979)
- Kenan Güven (1979–1980)
- Rıdvan Yenişen (1980–1984)
- Doğan Ünlüsoy (1984–1986)
- Temel Koçaklar (1986–1988)
- Adnan Darendeliler (1988–1991)
- Ömer Haliloğlu (1991–1992)
- Aslan Yıldırım (1992–1993)
- Ahmet Karabilgin (1993–1996)
- Aydın Güçlü (1996–2000)
- Lütfullah Bilgin (2000–2003)
- Dr. Hasan Canpolat (2003–2006)
- Veysel Dalmaz (2006–2009)
- Ali Kolat (2009–2012)
- Zübeyir Kemelek (2012–2014)
- Âlim Barut (2014–2016)
- Davut Gül (2016–2018)
- Salih Ayhan (2018–2022)
- Dr. Yılmaz Şimşek (2022–)

== See also ==
- Governor (Turkey)
- Sivas Province
- Ministry of the Interior (Turkey)
