= Sebahattin Öztürk =

Turkish politician

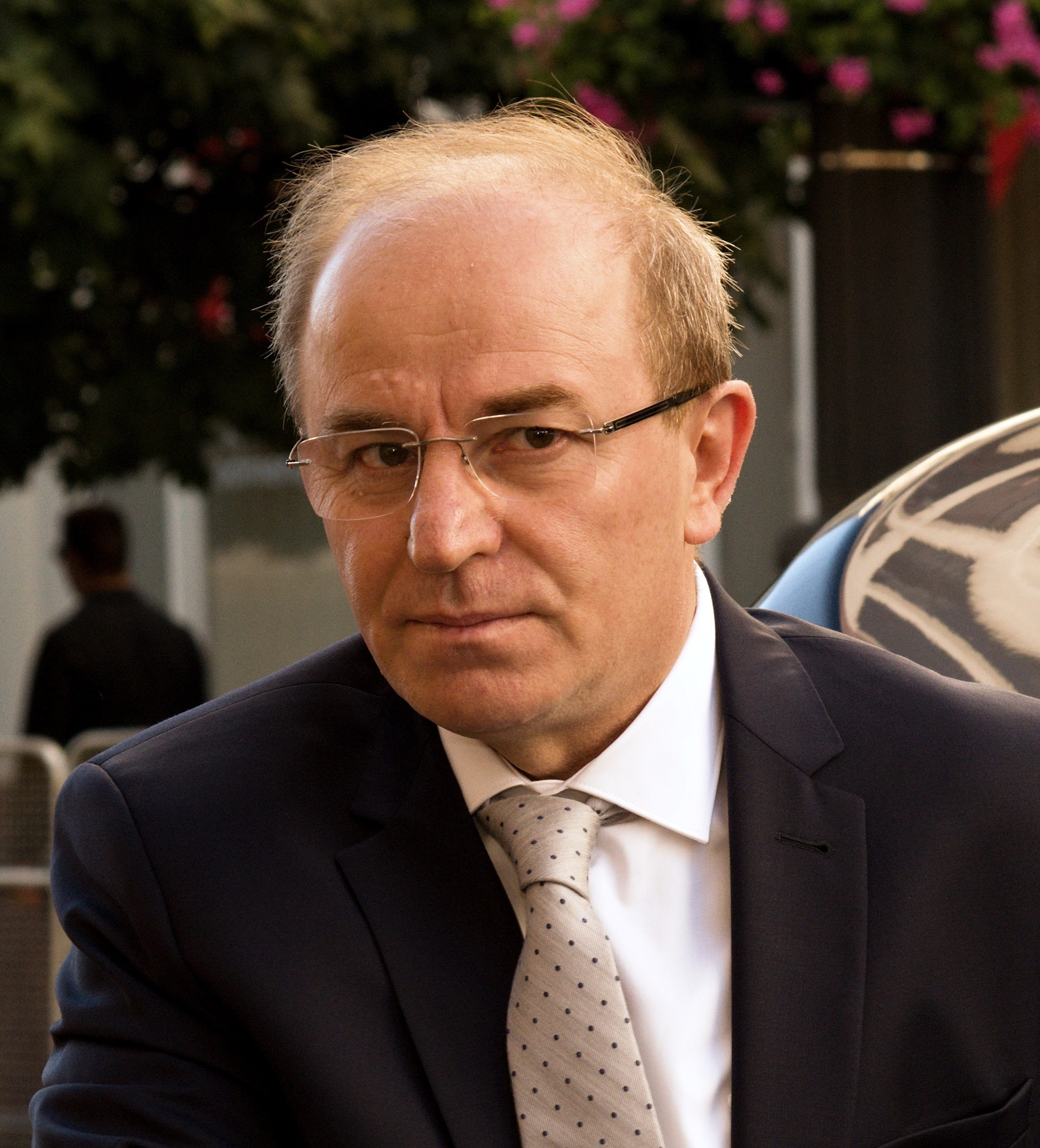

Minister of the Interior
- In office 7 March 2015 – 28 August 2015
- Prime Minister: Ahmet Davutoğlu
- Preceded by: Efkan Ala
- Succeeded by: Selami Altınok

Undersecretary to the Interior Ministry
- In office 15 September 2014 – 7 March 2015
- Minister: Efkan Ala
- Preceded by: Seyfullah Hacımüftüoğlu
- Succeeded by: Mükerrem Ünlüer

39th Governor of Antalya
- In office 8 May 2013 – 16 September 2014
- President: Abdullah Gül; Recep Tayyip Erdoğan
- Preceded by: Ahmet Altıparmak
- Succeeded by: Muammer Türker

43rd Governor of Erzurum
- In office 4 October 2009 – 8 May 2013
- President: Abdullah Gül
- Preceded by: Sami Bulut
- Succeeded by: Ahmet Altıparmak

41st Governor of Niğde
- In office 30 November 2007 – 4 October 2009
- President: Abdullah Gül
- Preceded by: Gündüz Beder
- Succeeded by: Alim Barut

Personal details
- Born: July 1, 1962 (age 64) Çaykaya, Trabzon Province, Turkey
- Education: Istanbul University
- Occupation: Civil servant
- Website: Government website

Sebahattin Öztürk (born 1 July 1962) is a Turkish politician, civil servant and bureaucrat who served as the Minister of the Interior of Turkey between March and August 2015. Previously the Undersecretary to the Interior Ministry since 2014, he took over as Minister from Justice and Development Party politician Efkan Ala three months prior to the June 2015 general election, as required by Article 114 of the Turkish Constitution. He is, formally, of no political affiliation.

== Early life and career ==
Öztürk was born in Çaykara, a district in Trabzon Province in 1962. Graduating from Istanbul University Faculty of Political Science and Public Governance in 1986, Öztürk successfully completed an exam to become a Kaymakam (a sub-governor of a provincial district) in 1987. He learnt English at Brighton University in the United Kingdom before beginning his term as a Kaymakam of the Osmangazi district of Bursa Province in 1990. While serving in this capacity, he was appointed as the Governor of Niğde Province in 2007, serving until 2009 where he was restationed as the Governor of Erzurum Province. Serving in this capacity until 2013, he was restationed for a second time as the Governor of Antalya, serving for a year until 16 September 2014.

He is married and has two children.

== Minister of the Interior ==
On 15 September 2014, he was appointed as the Undersecretary to the Interior Ministry, vacating his position as Governor of Antalya for this reason. With the Constitution requiring that the serving partisan Minister should vacate his position to his or her Undersecretary at least three months before a general election, Öztürk took over from Efkan Ala as Minister of the Interior on 7 March 2015 and is due to serve until a new government is formed after the election. The other ministers who replaced partisan ministers due to the constitutional requirement were Kenan İpek, who replaced Bekir Bozdağ as the Minister of Justice and Feridun Bilgin, replacing Lütfi Elvan as the Transport, Maritime and Communications Minister.

Despite being the Minister of the Interior, it was alleged that Efkan Ala continued as the de facto Minister despite resigning in March, working directly with President Recep Tayyip Erdoğan behind closed doors to secure necessary preparations for the Justice and Development Party (AKP) in time for the 2015 general election. Such preparations apparently included an allegedly staged operation in Ağrı Province against the Kurdish separatist PKK organisation in order to increase the AKP's popularity.

=== Labour Day protests ===
On 1 May 2015, he was criticised for endorsing and committing to carry out a series of decisions made by the Governor of Istanbul in relation to the planned May Day protests in Taksim Square. The police response to Labour day protests in Turkey have been accused of being notoriously heavy-handed, with the government taking the decision to close of Taksim Square entirely in preparation for Labour Day 2015.

== See also ==
- 62nd Government of Turkey
