= Governor of Erzurum =

Governor of a Turkish Province

Governor of Erzurum Erzurum Valiliği
- Incumbent; Aydın Baruş since 25 February 2026
- Appointer: President of Turkey; On the recommendation of the Turkish government
- Term length: No set term length or limit
- Inaugural holder: Zühtü Bey; 1923
- Website: Office of the Governor

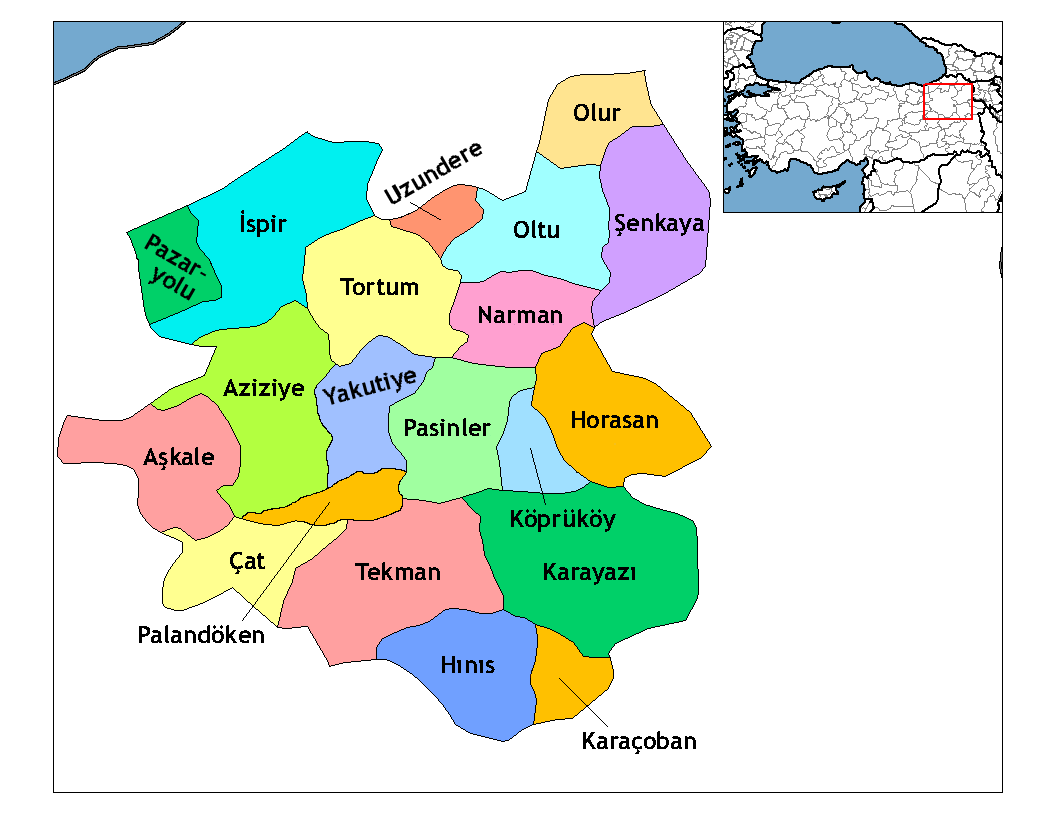
Map of the Province of Erzurum, showing the provincial districts.

The Governor of Erzurum (Turkish: Erzurum Valiliği) is the civil service state official responsible for both national government and state affairs in the Province of Erzurum. Similar to the Governors of the 80 other Provinces of Turkey, the Governor of Erzurum is appointed by the Government of Turkey and is responsible for the implementation of government legislation within Erzurum. The Governor is also the most senior commander of both the Erzurum provincial police force and the Erzurum Gendarmerie.

== Appointment ==
The Governor of Erzurum is appointed by the President of Turkey, who confirms the appointment after recommendation from the Turkish Government. The Ministry of the Interior first considers and puts forward possible candidates for approval by the cabinet. The Governor of Erzurum is therefore not a directly elected position and instead functions as the most senior civil servant in the province of Erzurum.

=== Term limits ===
The Governor is not limited by any term limits and does not serve for a set length of time. Instead, the Governor serves at the pleasure of the Government, which can appoint or reposition the Governor whenever it sees fit. Such decisions are again made by the cabinet of Turkey. The Governor of Erzurum, as a civil servant, may not have any close connections or prior experience in Erzurum Province. It is not unusual for Governors to alternate between several different Provinces during their bureaucratic career.

== Functions ==
The Governor of Erzurum has both bureaucratic functions and influence over local government. The main role of the Governor is to oversee the implementation of decisions by government ministries, constitutional requirements and legislation passed by Grand National Assembly within the provincial borders. The Governor also has the power to reassign, remove or appoint officials a certain number of public offices and has the right to alter the role of certain public institutions if they see fit. Governors are also the most senior public official within the Province, meaning that they preside over any public ceremonies or provincial celebrations being held due to a national holiday. As the commander of the provincial police and Gendarmerie forces, the Governor can also take decisions designed to limit civil disobedience and preserve public order. Although mayors of municipalities and councillors are elected during local elections, the Governor has the right to re-organise or to inspect the proceedings of local government despite being an unelected position.

== List of governors of Erzurum ==
- Tahsin Bey (1923)
- Zühtü Bey (1923–1928)
- Mehmet Fevzi Daldal (1928–1931)
- Necdet Bey (1931–1935)
- İbrahim Ethem Aykut (1935–1936)
- Haşim İşcan (1936–1940)
- Burhanettin Tekel (1940–1941)
- Fehmi Vural (1941)
- Eşref Erkut (1941–1944)
- Mesut Çehreli (1944–1949)
- Ahmet Demir (1949–1950)
- Şefik San (1950–1951)
- Kamil Tuncel (1951–1953)
- Cemal Babaç (1953–1954)
- Atıf Ulusoğlu (1954–1955)
- Niyazi Akı (1955–1960)
- Sait Koçak (1960)
- Hadi Ömür (1960–1962)
- Lütfi Uraz (1962–1964)
- Celal Coşkun (1964–1966)
- Ali Rıza Yaradanakul (1966–1968)
- Mustafa Yörükoğlu (1968–1971)
- Sabahattin Çakmakoğlu (1971–1975)
- Fikret Turgut Sayın (1975–1978)
- Yılmaz Ergun (1978–1979)
- Kenan Güven (1979–1981)
- Hasan Bamyacı (1981–1984)
- Aykut Ozan (1984–1988)
- Mehmet Karasarlıoğlu (1988–1991)
- Emrullah Zeybek (1991–1993)
- Oğuz Kağan Köksal (1993–1996)
- Mehmet Canseven (1996–2000)
- Mustafa Malay (2000–2003)
- Celalettin Güvenç (2003–2008)
- Sami Bulut (2008–2010)
- Sebahattin Öztürk (2010–2013)
- Dr. Ahmet Altıparmak (2013–2016)
- Seyfettin Azizoğlu (2016–2018)
- Okay Memiş (2018–2023)
- Mustafa Çiftçi (2023–2026)
- Aydın Baruş (2026–)

== See also ==
- Governor (Turkey)
- Erzurum Province
- Ministry of the Interior (Turkey)
