= Governor of Kırklareli =

Governor of Kırklareli Kırklareli Valiliği
- Incumbent; Ugur Turan since September 26, 2024
- Appointer: President of Turkey; On the recommendation of the Turkish government
- Term length: No set term length or limit
- Inaugural holder: İsmail Sabri Bey; 1924
- Website: Office of the Governor

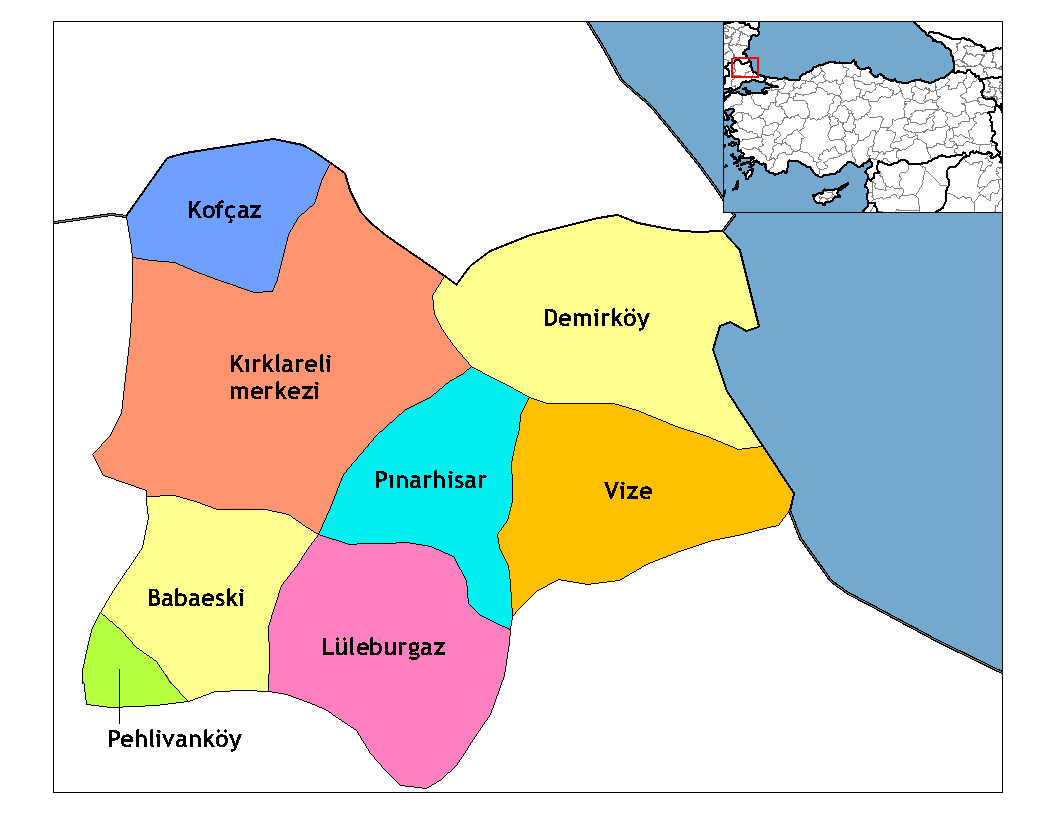
Map of the Province of Kırklareli, showing the provincial districts.

The governor of Kırklareli (Turkish: Kırklareli Valiliği) is the civil service official responsible for both national government and state affairs in the Province of Kırklareli. Similar to the governorsof the 80 other provinces of Turkey, the governor of Kırklareli is appointed by the government of Turkey and is responsible for the implementation of government legislation within Kırklareli. The governor is also the most senior commander of both the Kırklareli provincial police force and the Kırklareli Gendarmerie.

== Appointment ==
The governor of Kırklareli is appointed by the president of Turkey, who confirms the appointment after recommendation from the Turkish government. The Ministry of the Interior first considers and puts forward possible candidates for approval by the cabinet. The governor of Kırklareli is therefore not a directly elected position and instead functions as the most senior civil servant in the Province of Kırklareli.

=== Term limits ===
The governor is not limited by any term limits and does not serve for a set length of time. Instead, the governor serves at the pleasure of the government, which can appoint or reposition the governor whenever it sees fit. Such decisions are again made by the cabinet of Turkey. The governor of Kırklareli, as a civil servant, may not have any close connections or prior experience in Kırklareli Province. It is not unusual for governorsto alternate between several different provinces during their bureaucratic career.

== Functions ==
The governor of Kırklareli has both bureaucratic functions and influence over local government. The main role of the governor is to oversee the implementation of decisions by government ministries, constitutional requirements and legislation passed by the Grand National Assembly within the provincial borders. The governor also has the power to reassign, remove or appoint officials a certain number of public offices and has the right to alter the role of certain public institutions if they see fit. Governors are also the most senior public official within the province, meaning that they preside over any public ceremonies or provincial celebrations being held due to a national holiday. As the commander of the provincial police and Gendarmerie forces, the governor can also take decisions designed to limit civil disobedience and preserve public order. Although mayors of municipalities and councillors are elected during local elections, the governor has the right to re-organise or to inspect the proceedings of local government despite being an unelected position.

== List of governors of Kırklareli ==
- İsmail Sabri Bey (1924–1925)
- Kavalalı Sait Bey (1925–1926)
- Ahmet Durmuş Evrendilek (1927–1930)
- Mustafa Arif Deymer (1930–1932)
- Faik Üstün (1932–1936)
- Hasip Koylan (1936–1939)
- Ahmet İhsan Aksoy (1939–1941)
- Kazım Demirer (1941–1946)
- Salih Rıza Kılıç (1946–1948)
- Kâmuran Çuhruk (1948–1949)
- Nuri Atay (1949–1950)
- Cahit Ortaç (1950–1951)
- Mehmet Hilmi İncesulu (1951–1953)
- Abdullah Zeki Köymen (1953)
- Rıfat Bingöl (1953–1955)
- Şakir Canalp (1955–1956)
- Alaettin Eriş (1956–1958)
- Cenap Aksu (1958–1960)
- Hikmet Baloğlu (1960–1962)
- Mehmet Saraçoğlu (1962–1966)
- Nail Memik (1966–1968)
- Mehmet Aldan (1968–1970)
- Ziya Dönmez (1970–1971)
- Süfyan Emiroğlu (1971–1975)
- Naci Gürcan (1975–1978)
- Kadir Demir (1978–1979)
- Mustafa Gönül (1979–1980)
- Fikret Koçak (1980–1981)
- Refik Arslan Öztürk (1981–1984)
- Arif Atilla Osmançelebioğlu (1984–1987)
- Kamil Demircioğlu (1987–1991)
- Şahabettin Harput (1991–1992)
- Mevlüt Çetinkaya (1992–1996)
- Zeki Şanal (1996–2003)
- Ali Haydar Öner (2003–2006)
- Hüseyin Avni Coş (2006–2009)
- Cengiz Aydoğdu (2009–2010)
- Mustafa Yaman (2010–2014)
- Esengül Civelek (2014–2017)
- Orhan Çiftçi (2017–2018)
- Osman Bilgin (2018–2022)
- Birol Ekici (2022–2024)
- Uğur Turan (2024–)

== See also ==
- Governor (Turkey)
- Kırklareli Province
- Ministry of the Interior (Turkey)
