= Aydın Sayılı =

Turkish historian of science (1913-1993)

- Born: 2 May 1913; Istanbul, Ottoman Empire
- Died: 15 October 1993 (aged 80); Ankara, Turkey
- Resting place: Cebeci Cemetery
- Citizenship: Turkey
- Education: Harvard University
- Known for: Ottoman astronomy
- Scientific career
- Fields: History of Science
- Workplaces: Ankara University
- Doctoral advisor: George Sarton
- Doctoral students: Sevim Tekeli

Aydın Sayılı (pronounced [ajdɯn ˈsajɯɫɯ]; 2 May 1913 – 15 October 1993) was a Turkish historian of science. Sayılı's portrait is depicted on the reverse of the Turkish 5 lira banknote issued in 2009. He was the first PhD recipient in the world in the field of the history of science.

== Early life and education ==
Sayılı was born in Istanbul on 2 May 1913. His parents were Abdurrahman Sayılı (1875–1954) and Suat Sayılı (1889–1951). He had two sisters. Sayılı graduated from Atatürk High School in Ankara in 1933. His career was aided by a chance meeting with Mustafa Kemal Atatürk, whom he impressed enough to receive a state-supported scholarship to attend Harvard University, where he studied the history of science.

In 1942, Sayılı obtained a PhD degree in the history of science at Harvard University under the supervision of George Sarton. His PhD thesis focused on the scientific institutions in the Islamic world and represented one of the first PhD theses written on Islamic studies in Harvard University.

== Career ==
Sayılı began to work at the Department of Philosophy at Ankara University in 1943. He became associate professor in 1946 and full professor in 1952. He was promoted to be distinguished professor in 1958. Sayılı retired in 1983, and was appointed the head of the Atatürk Culture Centre in 1984. His term lasted until 1993. He also served as a member of the Turkish History Society and the International Academy of the History of Science.

A supporter of Öztürkçe, Sayılı participated in polemics and discussions on the Turkish language reform.

== Awards ==
In 1973, Aydın Sayılı was awarded by the Polish government with the Copernicus Medal for his work on the Polish astronomer Nicolaus Copernicus.

In 1977, he was decorated with the TÜBİTAK Service Award. In 1980 he was selected as a member of the International Editorial Committee of UNESCO. In 1981, he was awarded by Istanbul University the Excellent Service Award and in 1990 he was decorated with the UNESCO Award for his lifetime achievements.

== Death ==
Sayılı died of a heart attack in Ankara on 15 October 1993, aged 80. He was buried at Cebeci Cemetery in Ankara on 18 October 1993.

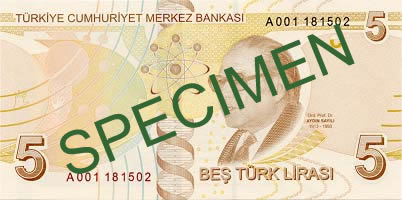
Reverse of the 5 Turkish lira banknote (2009)

== Works ==
Sayılı's works have been published in Turkish, English, Arabic and Persian.

- The Observatory in Islam, Arno Press, June 1981, part of The Development of Science: Sources for the History of Science Series; ISBN 0-405-13951-9
- Abdülhamid İbn-Türk'ün katışık denklemlerde mantıkî zaruretler adlı yazısı ve zamanın cebri (Logical necessities in mixed equations by ʿAbd al Ḥamîd Ibn Turk and the algebra of his time); reprint of the ed. Ankara, Türk Tarih Kurumu Basımevi, 1962, Inst. for the History of Arab-Islamic Science, Frankfurt am Main, 1997.
