= Davut Gül =

Governor of Istanbul since 2023

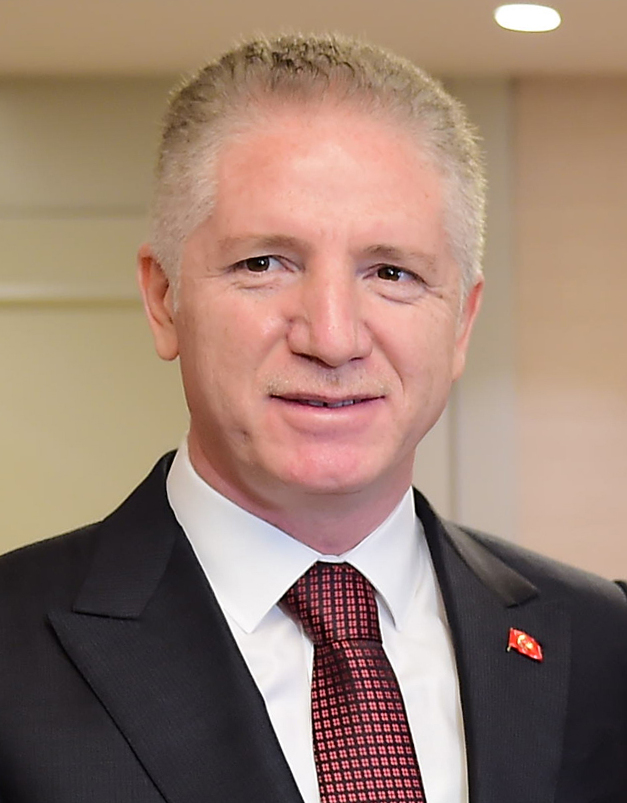

Governor of Istanbul
- Incumbent
- Assumed office 8 June 2023
- President: Recep Tayyip Erdoğan
- Preceded by: Ali Yerlikaya

Governor of Gaziantep
- In office 27 October 2018 – 5 June 2023
- President: Recep Tayyip Erdoğan
- Preceded by: Ali Yerlikaya
- Succeeded by: Kemal Çeber

Governor of Sivas
- In office 9 June 2016 – 27 October 2018
- President: Recep Tayyip Erdoğan
- Preceded by: Alim Barut
- Succeeded by: Salih Ayhan

Personal details
- Born: 1974 (age 51–52) Horasan, Erzurum
- Education: Near East University

Davut Gül (born 1974 Horasan, Erzurum) is a Turkish bureaucrat and the current Governor of Istanbul.

He graduated from Near East University's Department of International Relations. He started his political career as a candidate for Kaymakam (English: District governor) in Gaziantep.

In 2009 he won the "Martyr Kaymakam Ersin Ateş" award for "District Governor of the Year". In 2015 he was assigned to the Ministry of Interior General Directorate of Local Administrations head of department.

Political offices
Preceded by Ali Yerlikaya	Governor of Istanbul; 8 June 2023 – present	Succeeded by Incumbent
Preceded by Ali Yerlikaya	Governor of Gaziantep; 27 October 2018 – 5 June 2023	Succeeded by Kemal Çeber
Preceded by Alim Barut	Governor of Sivas; 9 June 2016 – 27 October 2018	Succeeded by Salih Ayhan
