= Mustafa Arif Deymer =

Turkish politician

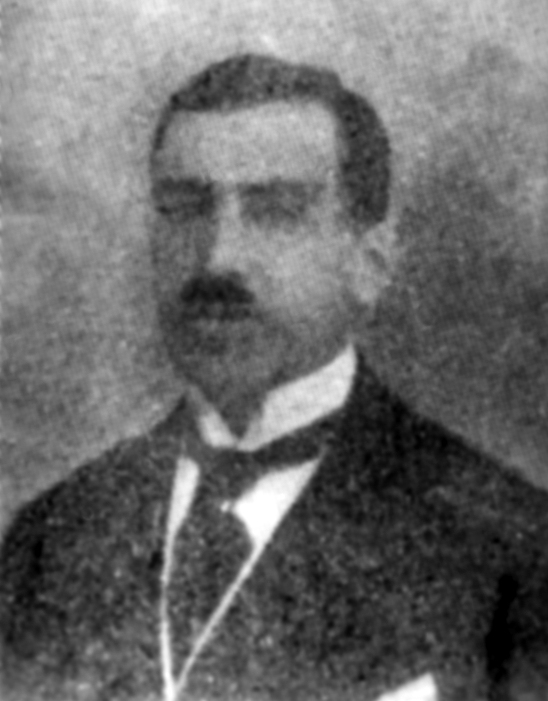
Mustafa Arif

Mustafa Arif Deymer (1874–1954) was a Turkish politician who served both the Ottoman government and the Turkish Republic. He served as the Ottoman interior minister from 1918 to 1919 and as minister of education in 1921. During the Turkish Republican era, he became governor of Kırklareli Province. He is also noted for providing important testimony in the aftermath of the Armenian genocide.

== Life and career ==
Mustafa Arif was born in Thessaloniki, Greece in 1874. He studied civil service. He subsequently served as a civil servant in his hometown of Thessaloniki.

He was then appointed as the Ottoman interior minister from 1918 to 1919 after Talaat Pasha resigned from his post.

On 21 October 1920, Mustafa Arif Bey was appointed as the head of the Council of State. He served this post until 19 August 1921. Thereafter, in 1921, he became the minister of education.

In 1924, after the establishment of the Republic of Turkey, Mustafa Arif served on the commission board of the Turkish Red Crescent during negotiations over the population exchange between Greece and Turkey.

On 27 July 1930, Mustafa Arif Deymer became governor of Kırklareli province, and served this position until 13 April 1932.

== Armenian genocide testimony ==
The Armenian genocide was the Ottoman government's systematic extermination of its minority Armenian subjects inside their historic homeland, which lies within the territory constituting the present-day Republic of Turkey. Mustafa Arif served as Interior Minister in 1918, succeeding Talat Pasha after the latter stepped down. Arif established a governmental commission that examined the period of the massacres. On March 18, 1919, the commission concluded that 800,000 Armenians had perished during these events. The figure became reputable after other Turkish historians such as Yusuf Hikmet Bayur used the figure in their research and writing.

Mustafa Arif testified as follows regarding the Armenian genocide:

Surely a few Armenians aided and abetted our enemy, and a few Armenian Deputies committed crimes against the Turkish nation ... it is incumbent upon a government to pursue the guilty ones. Unfortunately, our wartime leaders, imbued with a spirit of brigandage, carried out the law of deportation in a manner that could surpass the proclivities of the most bloodthirsty bandits. They decided to exterminate the Armenians, and they did exterminate them.

He also stated: "The atrocities committed against the Armenians reduced our country to a gigantic slaughterhouse." Mustafa Arif concluded that "Nobody asserts that it did not happen", and that the responsibility for the massacres belonged solely to the government of the time.

== See also ==
- Witnesses and testimonies of the Armenian genocide
