= Cahit Ortaç =

Turkish statesperson (1908–1980)

Hüseyin Cahit Ortaç

Governor of Bursa
- In office 1951–1954
- President: Celâl Bayar
- Preceded by: Mehmet Hilmi İncesulu
- Succeeded by: İhsan Sabri Çağlayangil

Governor of Kırklareli
- In office 1950–1951
- President: Celâl Bayar
- Preceded by: Nuri Atay
- Succeeded by: Mehmet Hilmi İncesulu

Personal details
- Born: 1908 Thessaloniki
- Died: 1980 (aged 71–72)

Hüseyin Cahit Ortaç (1908 in Thessaloniki – 13 December 1980) was a Turkish politician.

He graduated from Faculty of Political Science, Ankara University.

He worked as a civil servant in Dalaman and Istanbul. He served as a district governor in Alucra, Sürmene, Kargı and Mustafakemalpaşa. Later, he served as a governor in Hakkari, Kırklareli and Bursa. Also, he was a member of Council of State (Turkey) and Senate of the Republic (Turkey).
