= Hakkâri Province =

Province of Turkey

Coordinates: 37°27′58″N 44°03′52″E

- Province
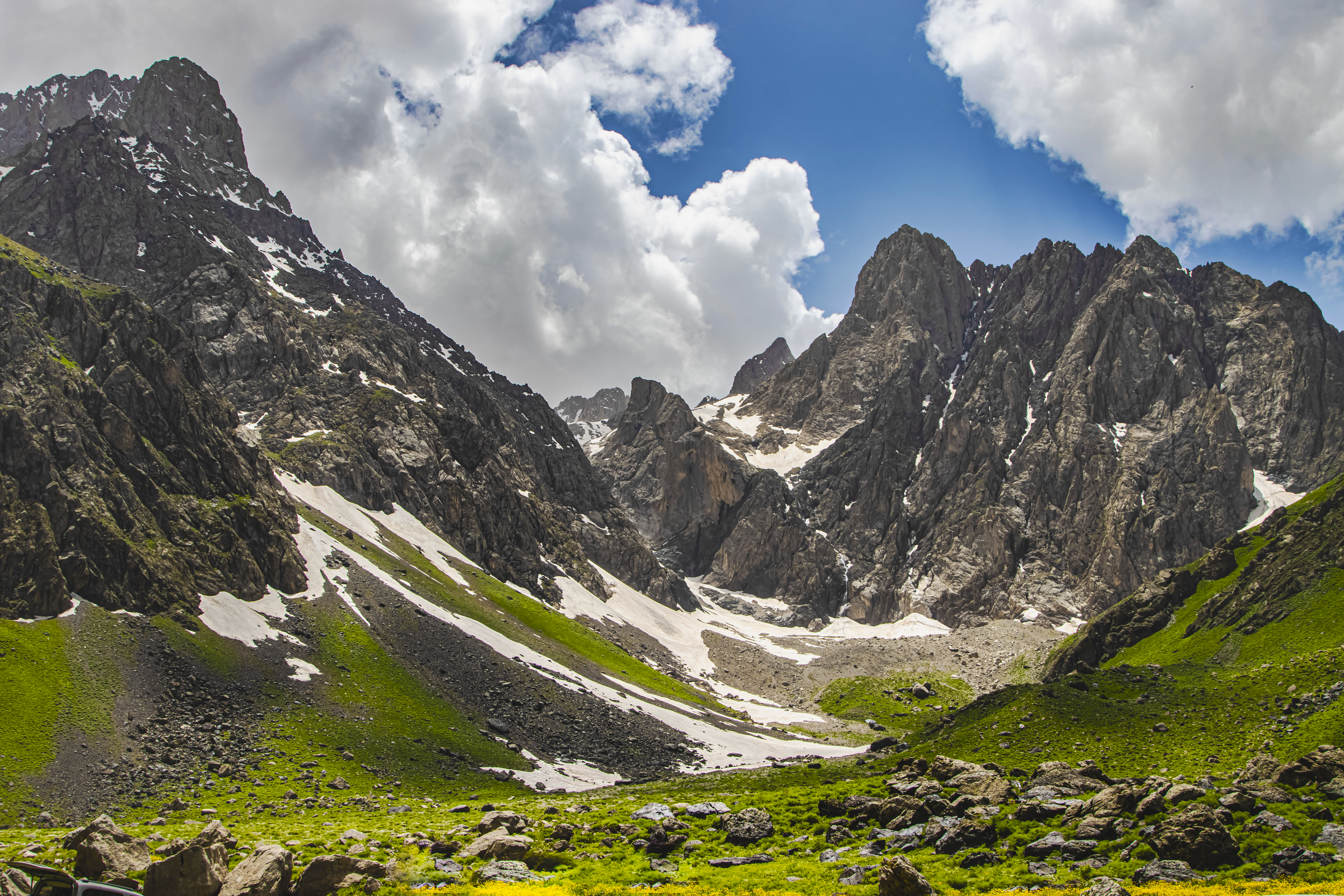
- Heaven and Hell Valley, Yüksekova

- Location of the province within Turkey
- Country: Turkey
- Seat: Hakkâri

Government
  - Governor: İbrahim Taşyapan
- Area: 7,095 km^{2} (2,739 sq mi)
- Population (2023): 287,625
  - Density: 40.54/km^{2} (105.0/sq mi)
- Time zone: UTC+3 (TRT)
- Area code: 0438
- Website: www.hakkari.gov.tr

Hakkâri Province (pronounced [hacːaːɾi], Turkish: Hakkâri ili; Kurdish: Parêzgeha Colemêrg), is a province in the southeast of Turkey. It borders Van Province to the north, and Şırnak Province to the west. The administrative centre is the city of Hakkâri. Its area is 7,095 km^{2}, and its population is 287,625 (2023). The current Governor is Ali Çelik. The province encompasses 8 municipalities, 140 villages and 313 hamlets. The province is considered part of Turkish Kurdistan and has a Kurdish majority.

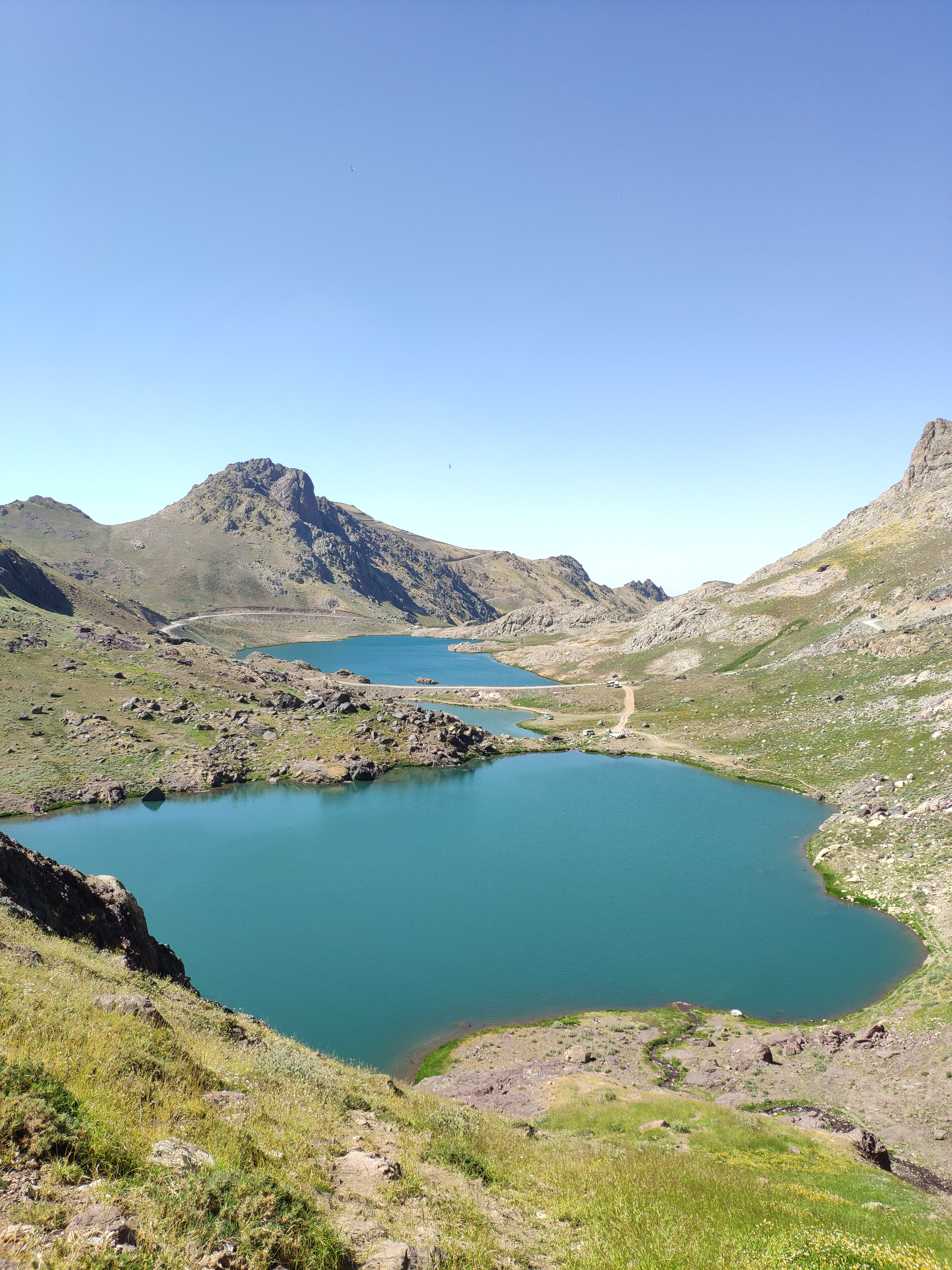
Sat glacier lakes

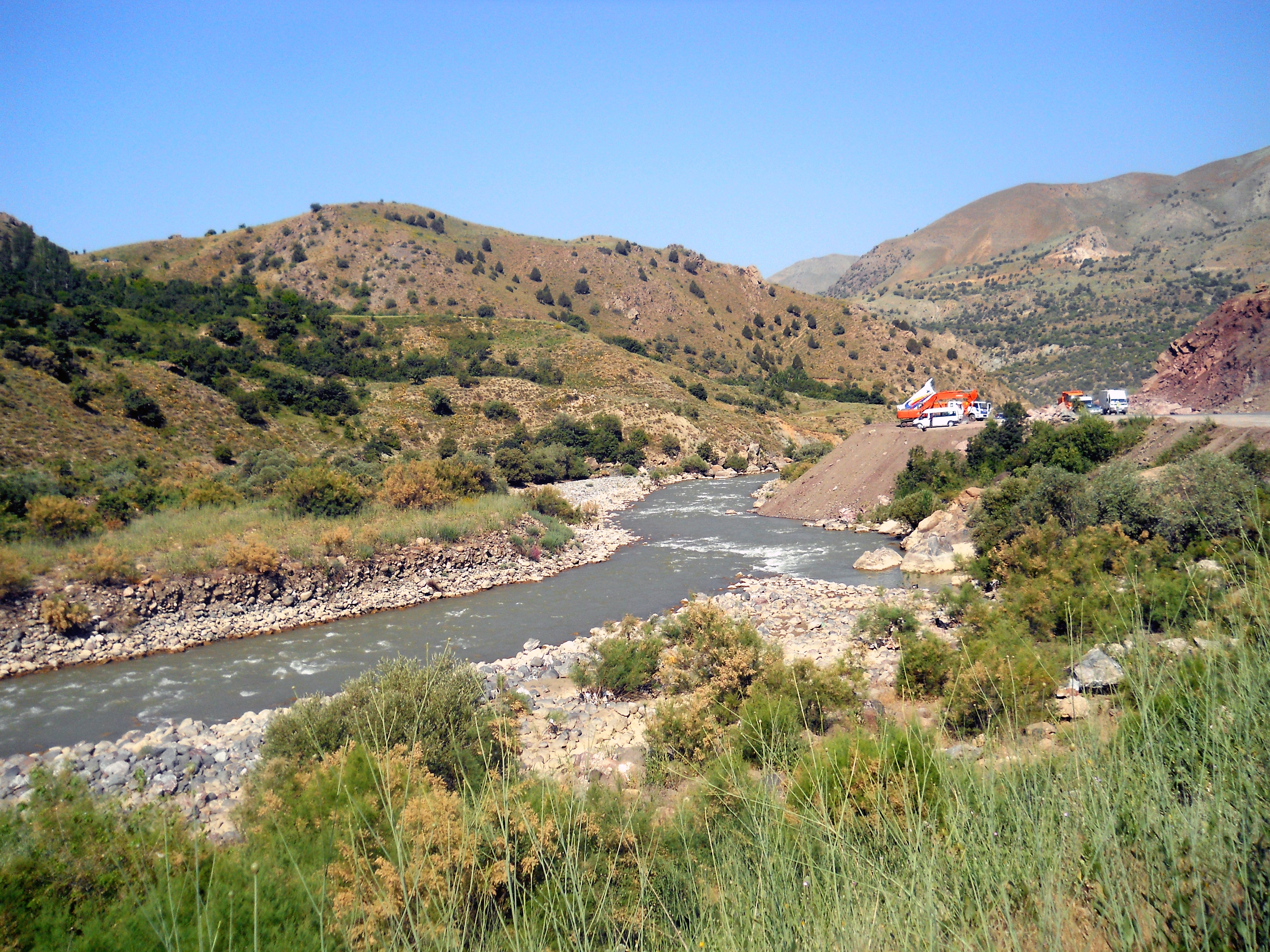
The river Great Zab in Hakkâri Province

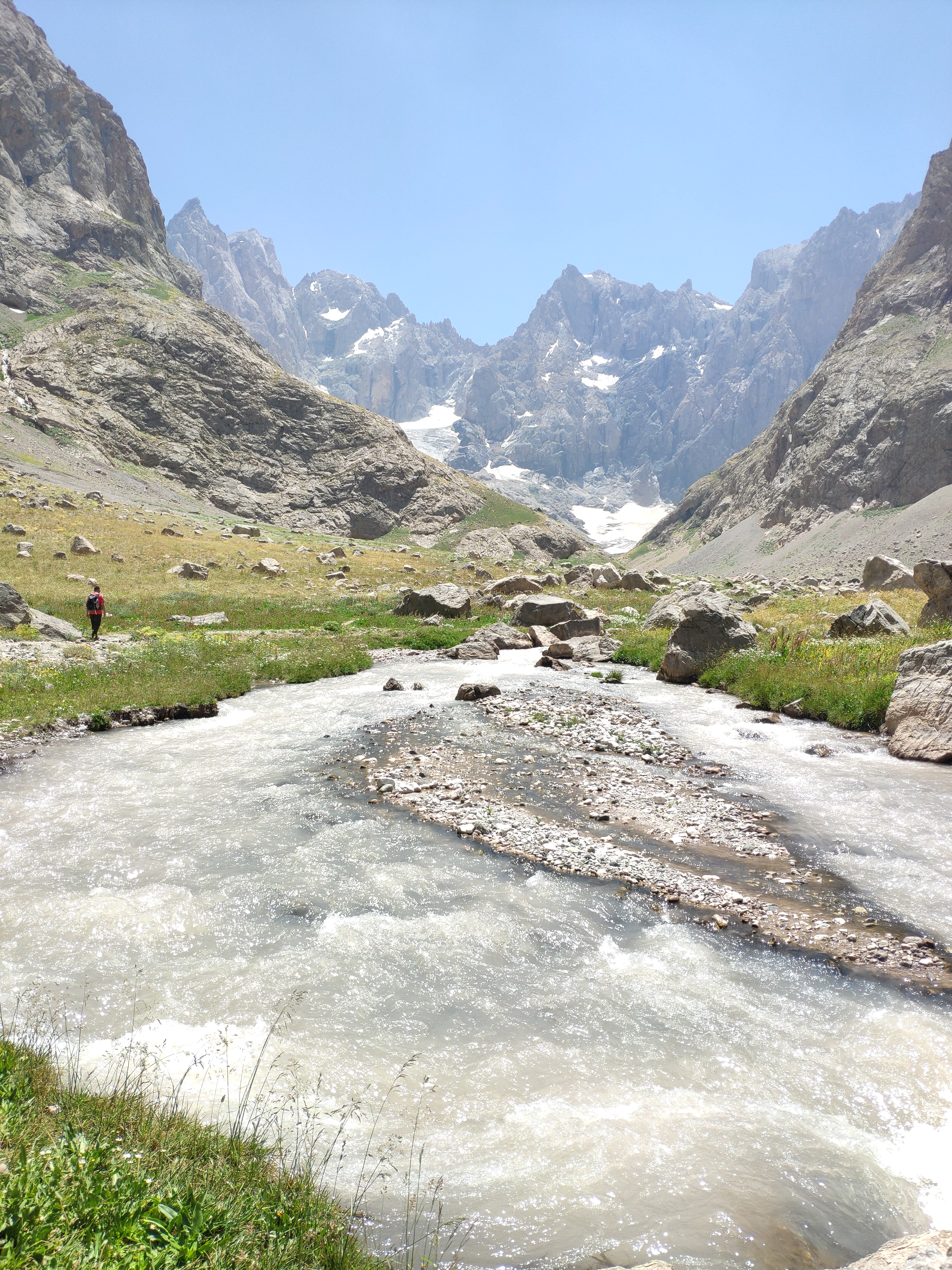
Heaven and Hell Valley, Hakkari Mountains

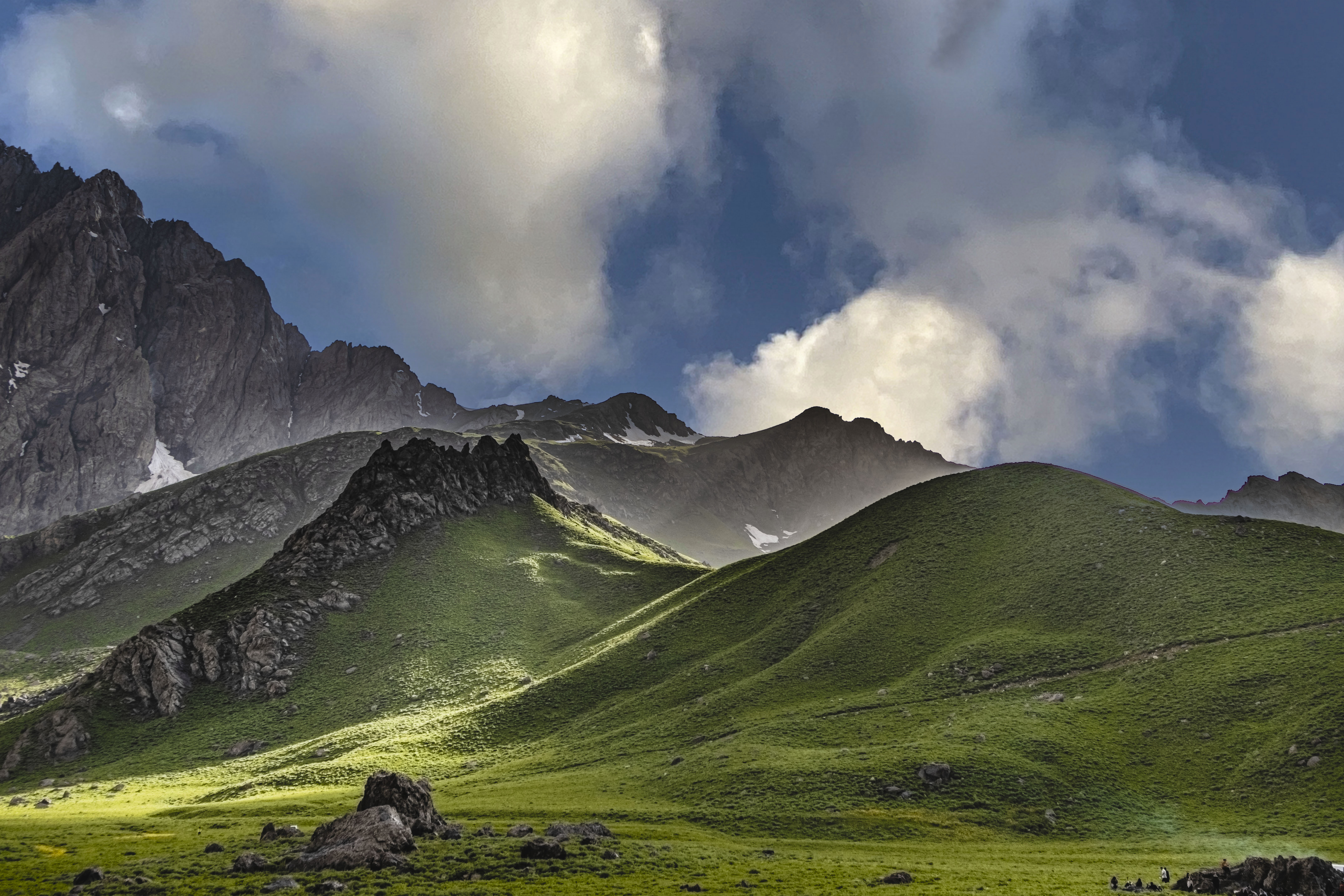
Hakkâri Cilo Mountains

The province is a stronghold for Kurdish nationalism and a hotspot in the Kurdish–Turkish conflict.

== Districts ==
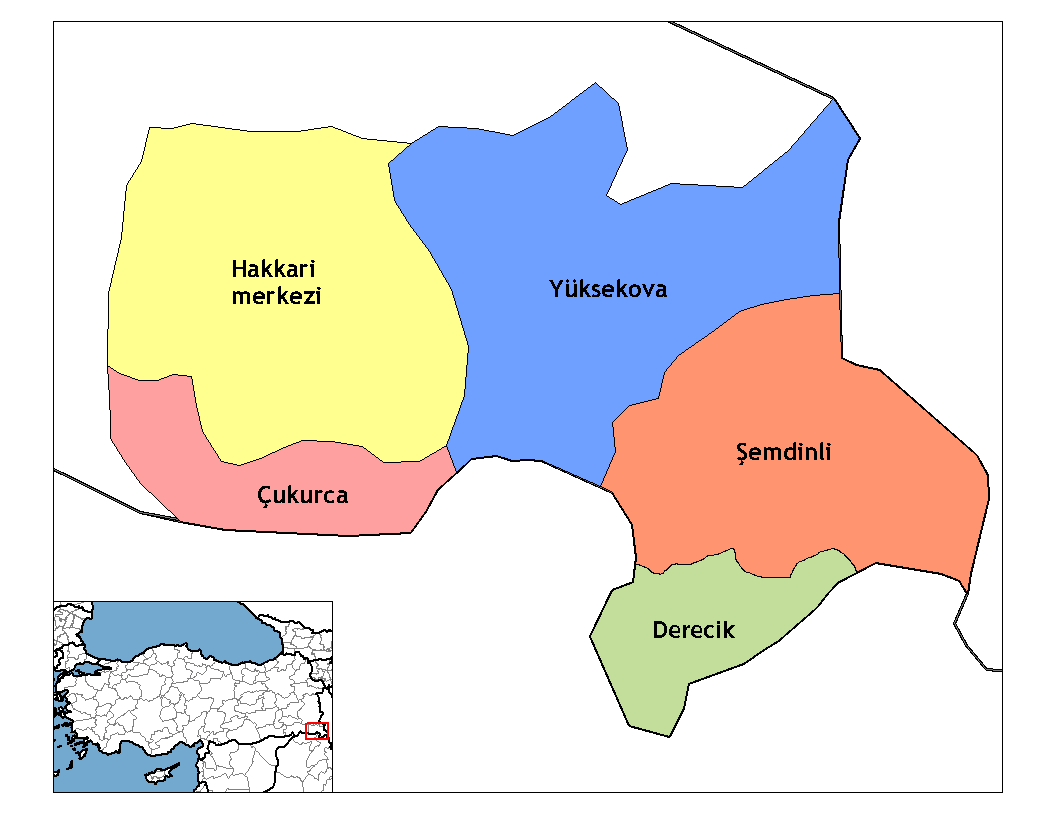
Districts of Hakkâri province

Hakkâri province is divided into five districts (capital district in bold):

- Çukurca District
- Derecik District (since 2018)
- Hakkâri District
- Şemdinli District
- Yüksekova District

== Demographics ==
Hakkari Province is located in Turkish Kurdistan and has an overwhelmingly Kurdish population. The province is tribal and most of the Kurds adhere to the Shafiʽi school of Sunni Islam with the Naqshbandi order having a strong presence around Şemdinli. The Kurdish tribes in the province include the Doski, Ertuşi, Gerdi, Herki, Jirki and Pinyaniş. The area had a significant Christian Assyrian population from various tribes before the Assyrian genocide in 1915. The Assyrian tribes in the region were Jilu, Dez, Baz, Tkhuma, Tal and Tyari. Relations between Assyrians and Kurds have been described as a 'tense coexistence' due to the ability to coexist despite the recurring disputes over land and life stock, and robbery of each other and of travelers. Assyrian resentment in the region was more directed towards the Ottomans than the Kurds, due to the Ottoman hostility towards the Christian minority, viewing them as a disloyal non-Muslim component.

Hakkari Sanjak, part of Van vilayet, had a population of 5,896 in 1881-1882 of which 81.9% was Muslim and 18.1% Christian.

In the 1945 census, 98.8% of the population was Muslim, while Jews constituted the largest religious minority with 0.1%. Only one Christian was enumerated in 1945, from the Protestant denomination. In the same census, Kurdish and Turkish were the first language for 87.8% and 11.4% of the population. The Jewish population left for Israel shortly after 1948. In the 1950 census, 89.5% of the population spoke Kurdish as first language, while the second largest first language was Turkish at 9%. In the subsequent census of 1955, Kurdish constituted the first language for 88.4% of the population and Turkish for 11.5%. The same census found 100% of the population to be Muslim. Kurdish and Turkish remained the two largest first languages in the 1960 census for 80.7% and 19.2% of the population, respectively. As with the previous census, Muslims constituted 100% of the population. In the last census conducted in Turkey in 1965, Kurdish remained the largest first language with 86.2%, while Turkish remained the second largest first language at 12.3%. 99.1% of the population was Muslim and 0.8% was Christian in 1965.

In 1980, the only language spoken in rural parts was Kurdish while both Kurdish and Turkish were spoken in urban areas, due to the presence of military and civil officials from other parts of Turkey.

== History ==
In the 14th century, Timur devastated the urban centers of Mesopotamia. His conquest of Baghdad and especially the destruction of Tikrit affected the Syrian Orthodox Church, which sheltered near Nineveh at Mar Mattai Monastery. Following the destruction of Christians in the region, the Ismailis and Sunni and Shi'a Muslims were attacked indiscriminately by Timur during the second part of the 14th century. The few survivors sought refuge among the Assyrians of Hakkari and the surrounding region. This region also produced many bishops and patriarchs as hereditary succession was used to prevent a full ecclesiastical collapse of the church. By the 16th century, the Assyrians disappeared from many cities where they previously thrived, such as in Tabriz and Nisibis. The head of the Church of the East moved from Baghdad to Maragheh by 1553.

=== Ottoman control ===
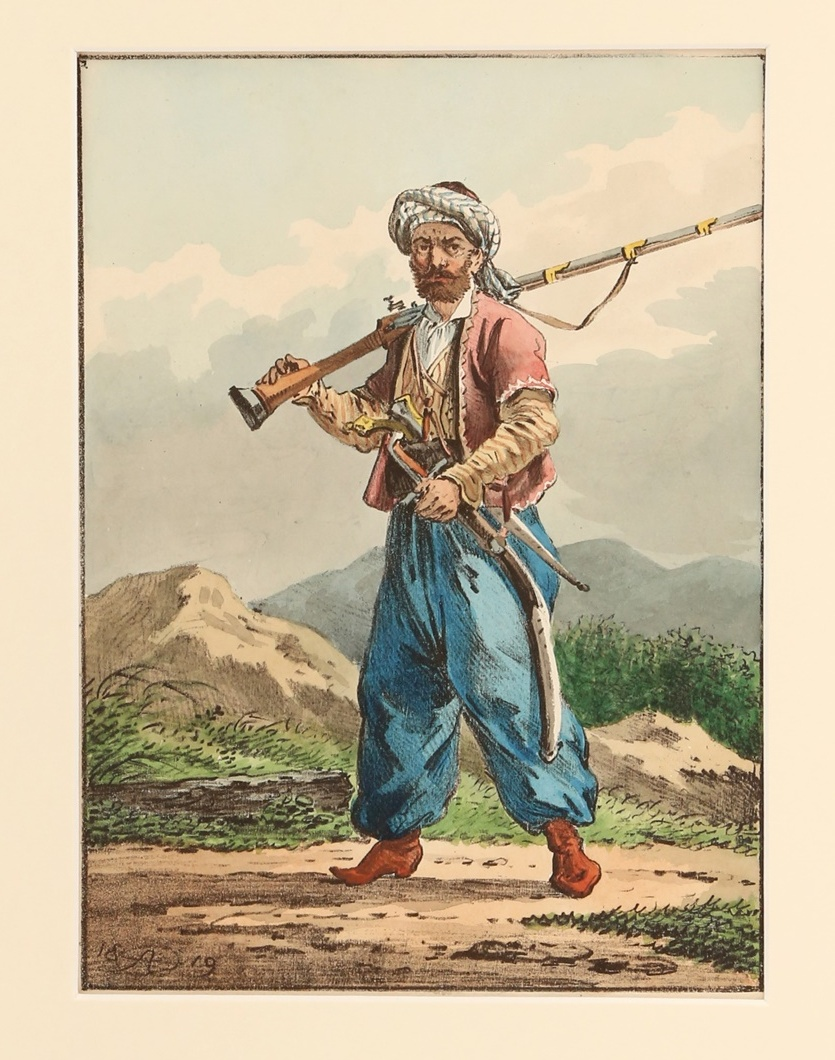
Portrait of a Kurdish fighter from the Hakkâri region (1819)

Although the region was nominally under Ottoman control since the 16th century, it was administered as Emirate of Hakkâri by its Kurdish inhabitants. Kurds also settled Armenian farmers in the region. The situation changed after the Badr Khan rule and the Tanzimat reforms as the Ottomans were now able to extend their full control unopposed. The region was part of Van Vilayet during the Ottoman era as Hakkari sanjak with Başkale serving as capital, except from 1880 to 1888 where it was elevated to vilayet status. As of 1920, Hakkari was producing lead. The lead, which came from a government owned mine, was used to make bullets.

==== Massacres of Badr Khan ====
In the 19th century, several competing Kurdish centers began emerging in the region. Mir Muhammed, the Kurdish Emir of the Soran Emirate, situated around Rawandiz was able to depose his rivals and control a region stretching from Mardin to Persian Azerbaijan. The Ottomans, seeking to consolidate their control of the region, engaged him in a costly war which eventually led to the dissolution of his Emirate. After the fall of his main rival, Bedir Khan Beg of Bohtan sought to extend his dominion by annexing the Assyrian regions in Hakkari. He took advantage of a rift between the patriarch Shimun XVII Abraham and Nur Allah, the Emir of Hakkari. Bedir Khan allied with Nur Allah and attacked the Assyrians of Hakkari in the summer of 1843, massacring them and taking those who survived as slaves. Another massacre was inflicted in 1846 on the Tyari tribe, also residing in Hakkari. The western powers, alarmed by the massacres pressured the Ottomans to intervene and the Emir of Bohtan was ultimately defeated and exiled to Crete in 1847.

==== Genocide and exodus ====
On the eve of the First World War, patriarch Shimun XIX Benyamin was promised preferential treatment in anticipation of the war. Shortly after the war began, however, Assyrian and Armenian settlements to the north of Hakkari were attacked and sacked by Kurdish irregulars allied with the Ottoman Army in the Assyrian genocide. Others were forced into labour battalions and later executed.

The turning point was when the patriarch's brother was taken prisoner as he was studying in Constantinople. The Ottomans demanded Assyrian neutrality and executed him as a warning. In return, the patriarch declared war on the Ottomans on 10 April 1915.

The Assyrians were immediately attacked by Kurdish irregulars backed by the Ottomans, driving most of the Assyrians of Hakkari to the mountain tops, as those who stayed in their villages were killed. Shimun Benjamin was able to move unnoticed to Urmia, which at the time was under Russian control, and tried to persuade them to send a relief force to the besieged Assyrians. When the Russians replied that the request was unreasonable, he returned to Hakkari and led the surviving 50,000 Assyrians through the mountains to safety in Urmia. Thousands perished from cold and hunger during this march. In 1924, Turkey expelled the last Christian inhabitants in the region.

=== In Turkey ===
In order to Turkify the local population, in June 1927 the Law 1164 was passed which allowed the creation of Inspectorates-General (Umumi Müffetişlik, UM). The province therefore was included in the so-called First Inspectorate General, which span over the provinces of Hakkâri, Siirt, Van, Mardin, Bitlis, Sanlıurfa, Elaziğ, and Diyarbakır. The first UM was created on the 1 January 1928 and centered in Diyarbakır. The UM was governed by an Inspector General, who governed with a wide-ranging authority over civilian, juridical and military matters. The office of the Inspector General was dissolved in 1952 during the government of the Democrat Party. Hakkari though was still banned for foreign citizens until 1965.

From July 1987 to August 2002 Hakkari was within the OHAL state of emergency region. It was Governed by a so-called Supergovernor, who was invested with additional powers than a normal Governor. He was given authority over all the other provincial Governors in the OHAL area and also the power to permanently relocate and resettle the village's population.

== Historical population ==
Population history of the province from 1927 to 2023:

Population

Year	Pop.	±%
1927	25,016	—
1935	33,109	+32.4%
1940	36,446	+10.1%
1945	35,124	−3.6%
1950	44,207	+25.9%
1955	54,824	+24.0%
1960	67,766	+23.6%
1965	83,937	+23.9%
1970	102,312	+21.9%
1975	126,036	+23.2%

Year	Pop.	±%
1980	155,463	+23.3%
1985	182,645	+17.5%
1990	172,479	−5.6%
2000	236,581	+37.2%
2007	246,469	+4.2%
2010	251,302	+2.0%
2015	278,775	+10.9%
2020	280,514	+0.6%
2023	287,625	+2.5%

== See also ==
- Ehmedê Xanî
- Ali Hariri
- Hakkari (electoral district)
- Sheikh Ubeydullah
- Hakkari (historical region)
- Hakkari Cilo-Sat Mountains National Park

== Bibliography ==
- Aboona, H (2008), Assyrians, Kurds, and Ottomans: intercommunal relations on the periphery of the Ottoman Empire, Cambria Press, ISBN 978-1-60497-583-3
- Alexander, V (1994) [1994], The First Civilization, Victor Alexander, ISBN 978-1-4486-7089-5
- Dündar, Fuat (2000), Türkiye nüfus sayımlarında azınlıklar (in Turkish), ISBN 9789758086771
- Gaunt, D; Beṯ-Şawoce, J (2006), Massacres, resistance, protectors: Muslim-Christian relations in Eastern Anatolia during World War I, Gorgias Press, ISBN 978-1-59333-301-0
- McDowall, D (2000), A modern history of the Kurds, I.B. Tauris, ISBN 978-1-85043-416-0.
- Nisan, M (2002) [1991], Minorities in the Middle East: a history of struggle and self-expression, McFarland, ISBN 978-0-7864-1375-1.
- Stafford, R (2006) [1935], The Tragedy of the Assyrians, Gorgias Press, ISBN 978-1-59333-413-0
