= Faik Üstün =

Turkish politician

Faik Üstün (1886 Muğla–1966 Ankara) was a Turkish politician who served as governor in Karaburun, Bodrum, Soma and Manisa. He was also a member of the Parliament of Turkey from the DP.
