= Osman Nuri Tekeli =

Turkish bureaucrat

- Born: 1893; Isparta
- Died: 3 February 1976 (aged 82–83); Ankara
- Education: Ankara University
- Occupations: Bureaucrat and governor
- Years active: 1914–1952
- Children: Sevim Tekeli; Two other daughters
- Parent(s): Ömer Faik Tekeli; Sıdıka Tekeli

Osman Nuri Tekeli (born 1893, Died 3 February 1976) was a Turkish bureaucrat, who served as the governor of several provinces.

== Early life and education ==
Tekeli was born in Isparta in 1893. He was the son of Ömer Faik and Sıdıka Tekeli.

Tekeli received his primary education in his hometown, Isparta. He then attended Vefa Lycee in Istanbul. He graduated from Mekteb-i Mülkiye-i Şahane (Mülkiye; now, Faculty of Political Science, Ankara University) in 1914.

== Career ==
Following his graduation Tekeli began to serve as district director of Ağırus-Atabey (Isparta) in 1914 until his military service. He served in the Ottoman army during World War I. Upon finishing his military service, he was appointed executive assistant at the directorate of security in 1918. In the same year, he became the head official of then-district Bayburt. Later, he was appointed head official of Pasinler. He served as the official head of Ödemiş in December 1922 and of Sürmene in 1923. He was appointed to other districts as head official such as Fethiye, Bozdağ, Keşan and Osmaniye until 1935 when he became civil inspector (Mülkiye Müfettişi in Turkish).

He was appointed governor of Erzincan Province in 1939. During his tenure, the province witnessed a huge natural disaster, the 1939 Erzincan earthquake. The earthquake with an intensity of 8.2 MS hit the province at 1:57 am (GMT 11:57 pm) on 27 December 1939. The death toll was around 32,962. Tekeli informed the government officials about the disaster as soon as possible. Then, the province began to receive medical, food and other related assistance.

Later, he served as the governor of various provinces including Denizli, Diyarbakır, Kahramanmaraş and Bilecik. His last governorship was in Afyonkarahisar from 1946 to 1948. He then was appointed head of the Inspection Directorate at the Ministry of Interior in Ankara, and his tenure lasted for five years until his retirement in 1952.

== Personal life ==
O. Nuri Tekeli was married and had three daughters, one of whom is Sevim Tekeli, Turkish historian of science.
