= List of Turkish civil servants =

This is a list of notable civil servants of the Republic of Turkey.

== Living ==
=== Jurists ===
Zeki Akar	Deputy First President of the Court of Cassation
Osman Arslan	first president of the Court of Cassation
Sumru Çörtoğlu	Chief Justice of the Turkish Council of State
Zerrin Güngör	Chief Justice of the Turkish Council of State
Nuri Ok	the Chief Prosecutor of the Court of Cassation
Uğur İbrahimhakkıoğlu	Secretary General of the Court of Cassation
Ahmet Necdet Sezer	former (the tenth) President of the Republic of Turkey and former Chief Justice of Turkey
Osman Şirin	Deputy First President of the Court of Cassation
Tülay Tuğcu	former Chief Justice of Turkey
Abdurrahman Yalçınkaya	Chief Public Prosecutor of the Court of Cassation

=== Politicians and diplomats ===
Baki İlkin	Representative of Turkey to the United Nations
Abdüllatif Şener	former Finance Minister in the 54th cabinet of the Turkish Government and former Deputy Prime Minister
Naim Talu	an economist, banker, politician and former Prime Minister of Turkey

=== Others ===
Ali Bardakoğlu	the President of Diyanet İşleri Başkanlığı (Presidency of Religious Affairs)
Osman Birsen	high-ranking civil servant for finance and currently the CEO of the Istanbul Stock Exchange
Mustafa Çağrıcı	professor for Islamic theology and currently mufti of Istanbul
Mevlüt Çavuşoğlu	Turkish diplomat and politician; former Minister of Foreign Affairs of Turkey
Muammer Güler	governor of Istanbul Province
Süreyya Serdengeçti	former Governor of the Central Bank of Turkey
Emre Taner	chief of the governmental intelligence agency of Turkey Milli İstihbarat Teşkilatı (MİT) (National Intelligence Organization)
Durmuş Yılmaz	Governor of the Central Bank of the Republic of Turkey

== Deceased ==
Haşim İşcan	a high school teacher, province governor and mayor of Istanbul
Ferit Melen	a civil servant, politician and former Prime Minister of Turkey
Şükrü Âli Ögel	a military officer and the first director of the former Turkish governmental intelligence agency Milli Emniyet Hizmeti (MAH) (National Security Service), the predecessor of Milli İstihbarat Teşkilatı (MİT) today
Mustafa Yücel Özbilgin	a supreme court magistrate, who was shot dead in the nation's supreme courtroom in Ankara, Turkey
Abdülhalik Renda	a civil servant and politician, and a close co-worker of Kemal Atatürk

== See also ==
- List of Turkish people
