= Hasan Erbil =

Chief Public Prosecutor of the Supreme Court
- In office 21 May 2011 – 21 May 2015
- Preceded by: Abdurrahman Yalçınkaya
- Succeeded by: Mehmet Akarca

Personal details
- Born: 2 March 1952 (age 74) Serinhisar, Denizli, Turkey

Hasan Erbil (born 2 March 1952) is a retired Turkish lawyer who served as a Chief Public Prosecutor of the Turkish Supreme Court.

== Biography ==
Erbil was born on 2 March 1952 in Denizli, Yüreğil, Serinhisar. He completed Acıpayam High School in 1969. He graduated from Ankara University Faculty of Law in 1973. He graduated from Isparta shortly after his graduation.

Erbil was elected to the Supreme Court of Appeals on 8 May 2001 after serving in various posts and who also served as a member of the Supreme Board of Elections in 2004–2010, was a member of the Supreme Court's Sixth Penal Section, Abdullah Gül was elected to the Chief Public Prosecutor of the Supreme Court of Appeals on 30 April 2011 and commenced his duty on 21 May. He retired voluntarily on 21 May 2015. Erbil has written books related to election law.

In July 2006, the Court of Cassation was among the members who defended the idea that Hrant Dink was guilty in the General Assembly.

Legal offices
Preceded by Abdurrahman Yalçınkaya	Chief Public Prosecutor of Supreme Court, Republic of Turkey; 21 May 2011 – 21 May 2015	Succeeded by Mehmet Akarca
