= Hasan Gerçeker =

Turkish judge (born 1946)

First President of the Supreme Court
- In office 6 February 2008 – 1 June 2011
- Preceded by: Osman Arslan
- Succeeded by: Nazım Kaynak

Head of the 9th Criminal Office of the Supreme Court of Appeals
- In office 21 January 2002 – 6 February 2008
- Preceded by: Demirel Tavil
- Succeeded by: Mahmut Acar

Personal details
- Born: 1 June 1946 (age 80) Ankara, Turkey
- Website: yargitay.gov.tr

Hasan Gerçeker (born 1 June 1946, in Ankara, Turkey) is the first Turkish President of the Court of Cassation.

== Biography ==
He started his career in Ankara in 1970 and worked in various places such as Doğubeyazıt, Pazaryeri, Aksaray Deputy Public Prosecutor, Deputy Attorney General of the Military Court of Cassation and auditor of the Court of Cassation. He was appointed as a member of the Supreme Court of Appeals on 20 January 1995. He was appointed as a substitute member of the Penal Section of the Dispute Court in 1999 and was among the 3 candidates nominated by the Supreme Court's Grand General Assembly in 2000.

In 2002 and 2006, he was elected to the 9th Criminal Division of the Supreme Court of Appeals. Hasan Gerçeker, who was appointed as the First Presidency of the Court of Cassation on the majority of the general assembly meeting held on 6 February 2008, retired from the age limit as of 1 June 2011. He was the chairman of the Turkish Football Federation Arbitration Committee. He served as the president of the Central Criminal Board of the General Directorate of Youth and Sports between 1994 and 2004 and as the chairman of the Arbitration Board of the General Directorate of Sports between 2004 and 2015. He teaches Criminal Law General Provisions (Court of Cassation Practices) at Istanbul Kültür University Faculty of Law. He is also YARSAV member.

Legal offices
Preceded by Osman Arslan	President of the Supreme Court; 2008–2011	Succeeded by Nazım Kaynak
