= Uğur =

- Pronunciation: Turkish: [uːɾ] Azerbaijani: [uˈɣuɾ]
- Gender: Masculine
- Language: Turkish; Azerbaijani

Origin
- Language: Old Turkic
- Origin: uğur
- Derivation: uğur
- Meaning: "luck"

Other names
- Cognate: Oğur

Uğur is a common masculine Turkish and Azerbaijani given name. In both Turkish and Azerbaijani, the word "uğur" means "luck".

== Given name ==
- Uğur Albayrak (born 1988), Turkish footballer
- Uğur Boral (born 1982), Turkish footballer
- Uğur Çiftçi (born 1992), Turkish footballer
- Uğur Çimen (born 1975), Turkish football coach
- Uğur Dağdelen (born 1973), Turkish former footballer
- Uğur Demirkol (born 1990), Turkish footballer
- Uğur Demirok (born 1988), Turkish footballer
- Uğur Dündar (born 1943), Turkish journalist, political commentator, and writer
- Uğur Erdener (born 1950), Turkish academic and physician
- Uğur Erdoğan (born 1987), Turkish footballer
- Uğur Güneş (born 1987), Turkish film and television actor
- Uğur Güneş (born 1993), Turkish volleyball player
- Uğur Gürses, Turkish financial columnist
- Uğur Işıkal (born 1985), Turkish footballer
- Uğur İbrahimhakkıoğlu (born 1964), Turkish judge
- Uğur İnceman (born 1981), Turkish-German footballer
- Uğur Kaan Yıldız (born 2002), Turkish footballer
- Uğur Kapısız (born 1987), Turkish footballer
- Uğur Rıfat Karlova (born 1980), Turkish comedian, actor, and writer
- Uğur Kavuk (born 1979), Turkish footballer
- Uğur Köken (born 1937), Turkish former footballer
- Uğur Arslan Kuru (born 1989), Turkish footballer
- Uğur Mumcu (1942–1993), Turkish investigative journalist
- Uğur Orel Oral (born 1979), Turkish swimmer
- Uğur Pamuk (born 1989), Azerbaijani footballer
- Uğur Pektaş (born 1979), Turkish actor
- Uğur Polat (born 1961), Turkish actor
- Uğur Soldan (born 1978), Turkish author, critic, academic, and lecturer
- Uğur Şahin (born 1965), Turkish-German scientist, founder & CEO of Biontech
- Uğur Taner (born 1975), Turkish swimmer
- Uğur Tütüneker (born 1963), Turkish former footballer
- Uğur Uçar (born 1987), Turkish footballer
- Uğur Uluocak (1962–2003), Turkish outdoorsman, photographer, and editor
- Uğur Ümit Üngör (born 1980), Dutch scholar
- Uğur Yıldırım (born 1982), Turkish footballer
- Uğur Yücel (born 1957), Turkish film actor, producer, and director

== Surname ==
- Özkan Uğur (1953–2023), Turkish pop musician

== Places ==
- Uğur, Düzce
