= Abdurrahman Yalçınkaya =

Turkish judge (born 1950)

17. Chief Public Prosecutor of the Supreme Court
- In office 21 May 2007 – 21 May 2011
- Preceded by: Nuri Ok
- Succeeded by: Hasan Erbil

7. Chief Prosecutor of the Supreme Court
- In office 21 June 2004 – 20 May 2007
- Preceded by: Erol Öcal
- Succeeded by: Kubilay Özkan

Personal details
- Born: March 10, 1950 (age 76) Suruç, Şanlıurfa, Turkey

Abdurrahman Yalçınkaya (/əbdʊəˈræxmæn jɑːltʃɪnˈkaɪ.ə/ əb-doo-RAKH-man yahl-chin-KY-ə; Turkish: [abduɾahˈman jaɫˈtʃɯnkaja]; born 10 March 1950 in Şanlıurfa, Turkey) is a high-ranking Turkish judge and the former Chief Public Prosecutor (between 2007 and 2011) of the Supreme Court of Appeals of Turkey. Since the end of his term on 2011, he has been a member of the Supreme Court of Appeals' Eight Civil Department.

== Party closure cases ==
As the highest-ranked Public Prosecutor of Turkey, Abdurrahman Yalcinkaya submitted an indictment before the Constitutional Court demanding the closure of the Democratic Society Party (DTP) on 16 September 2007. That the DTP demanded education in the native language and a federal administration were viewed as evidence of the party receiving orders by Abdullah Öcalan, the imprisoned leader of the Kurdistan Workers' Party (PKK). The request was successful and on 11 December 2009 the Court of Cassation under the presidency of Haşim Kılıç banned the party with eleven votes, thus making it a unanimous decision. Yalçınkaya also brought charges against the ruling Justice and Development Party (AKP) on 14 March 2008 to the Constitutional Court of Turkey, charging the party for violating the principle of separation of religion and state in Turkey and requesting that the party be closed and its 71 officials barred from politics for five years. Those officials included the then president Abdullah Gül and then prime minister Recep Tayyip Erdoğan. The court confirmed that the party had become "a center for anti-secular activities", but decided not to close the party, imposing a financial penalty as a warning instead by cutting 50% of the state funding to the party.

Legal offices
Preceded by Nuri Ok	Chief Public Prosecutor of Supreme Court; 21 May 2007 - 21 May 2011	Succeeded by Hasan Erbil

Legal offices
Preceded by Erol Öcal	Chief Prosecutor of the Supreme Court of Appeals; 21 June 2004 – 20 May 2007	Succeeded by Kubilay Özkan
