= Ombudsman Institution =

Turkish institution

- Kamu Denetçiliği Kurumu
- Logo

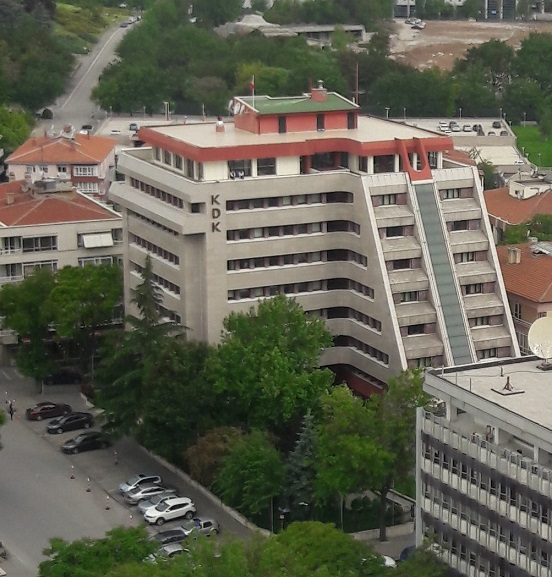
- The building where the institution is located

Agency overview
- Formed: 29 May 2012; 12 years ago
- Jurisdiction: Grand National Assembly of Turkey
- Headquarters: Çankaya, Ankara; 39°54′4.68″N 32°51′26.42″E
- Annual budget: 20.322.000,00 ₺
- Chief Ombudsperson responsible: Mehmet Akarca
- Ombudspeople responsible: Ertunç Erkan Balta; Fatma Benli Yalçın; Sadettin Kalkan; Abdullah Cengiz Makas; Özcan Yıldız
- Website: ombudsman.gov.tr

The Ombudsman Institution (Turkish: Kamu Denetçiliği Kurumu) is a Turkish institution that examines and investigates complaints and submits recommendations about the conformity of the activities of the Government of Turkey with law and fairness with respect to human rights. The institution is independent of the government and answers to the Parliament alone. The Ombudsman Institution evaluates complaints from both individuals and legal entities; foreign nationals may also lodge complaints.

Its functioning is regulated by article 74 of the Constitution of Turkey and by parliamentary bill number 6328 14 June 2012. The office is accredited as Turkey's national human rights institution.

== History ==
The Ombudsman Institution (OI) was created following the 2010 Turkish constitutional referendum, in which articles about appealing to an ombudsman were adopted.

In 2014, the OI, together with UNICEF, created a website for children to report violations of children's rights.

== International ==
The OI is a voting member of the International Ombudsman Institute.

== List of chief ombudsmen ==
No.	Portrait	Name	Took office	Left office
1		Mehmet Nihat Ömeroğlu	5 December 2012	5 December 2016
2		Şeref Malkoç	5 December 2016	9 December 2024
3		Mehmet Akarca	9 December 2024	present
