= Uğur Uluocak =

Turkish mountaineer, photographer and editor

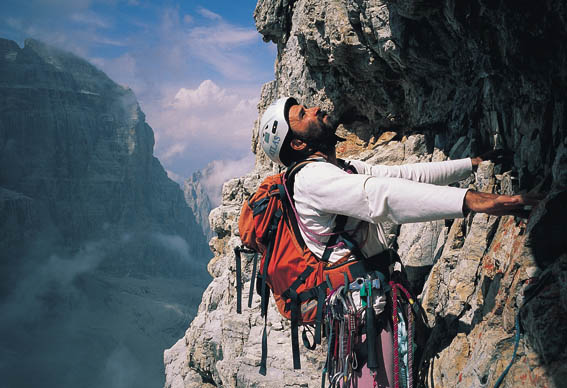
- Born: 1962; Turkey
- Died: 2 July 2003 (aged 41); Kyrgyzstan

Yaşar Uğur Uluocak (1962 – 2 July 2003) was a Turkish outdoorsman, mountaineer, photographer, and editor.

Born in 1962 in Ankara, Turkey, Uğur attended Saint Joseph High School in Istanbul, and graduated in mechanical engineering from Istanbul Technical University.

Uğur started mountain climbing in 1984 with the mountaineering club at Istanbul Technical University (ITUDAK). Uğur was a complete sportsman. He competed four years in rowing, ranking in first place. He was a middle- and long-distance runner for eight years, and a scuba diver and cyclist for the last two years. As a globally known mountaineer, he trained many young sportsmen, both in theoretical and practical ways.

From 1999 on, Uğur worked as a photographer, expedition coordinator, and editor for the Turkish nature and outdoor sports magazine Atlas. He not only wrote about his mountaineering adventures but also on mountaineering ethics and history with his friend Ahmet Köksal.

Uğur was an influential figure in the Turkish mountaineering community, with a very strong and dedicated personality and an extremely high intellectual capacity. He was fluent in five languages.

Professionally, he was a lecturer at the Marmara University in Istanbul and was also an active member of the Communist Party of Turkey for over 20 years.

Uğur Uluocak died on 2 July 2003 while on a descent in the Alarcha Mountain in Kyrgyzstan when a rock broke off and he took a 4,200-metre (13,800 ft) fall. His body was recovered by his teammates Haldun Ülkenli and Alper Işın Duran and brought to his homeland for burial. Uğur is the second Turkish mountaineer after Ali Kepenek to have died in a foreign country while climbing a mountain.

== Achievements ==
- Direktaş, north face (solo, in 2 hours) and northeast dihedral, Ala Mountains (Turkey)
- Mt. Büyük Demirkazık, west face (solo) and north face, Ala Mountains (Turkey)
- Mt. Küçük Demirkazık, south face (first ascent), Ala Mountains (Turkey)
- Çağalın Başı, northwest face (first ascent), Ala Mountains (Turkey)
- Ağrı (Mount Ararat) (5,137 m), north glacier in summer and winter
- Mount Elbrus (5,642 m) in Caucassus
- Peak Vorobiyov (5,685 m), Peak Chetyriokh (Peak of Fours) (6,299 m), Peak Korzhenevskaya (7,105 m), Peak Communism (7,495 m) in Pamir Mountains
- Razdelnaya (6,248 m), Khan Tengri (7,010 m), Lenin Peak (7,134 m) in Kyrgyzstan.
- K-2 (8,611 m), two attempts in 1998 and 1999
- 1999 Shisha Pangma (8,013 m) in People's Republic of China
- 1999 Cho Oyu (8,201 m) in Nepal, alpine solo
- 2000 Annapurna attempt
- 2002 Mt. Reşko (4,135 m), northwest/north face, Cilo Mountains (Turkey)
