= Hüseyin Erkan =

Hüseyin Erkan (born 1958 in Konya, Turkey) was CEO of the World Federation of Exchanges (WFE) from June 2012 until October 2014. He was the Chairman and CEO of the Istanbul Stock Exchange (ISE) from 2007 until 2012.

After graduating from high school in Konya, Erkan completed a certificate program at the English Language Center in Brighton, England. He received an Associate in Science (AS) degree from Orange County Community College in New York in 1979. He then graduated from New York University Stern Business School with a B.S. degree in economics (1981) and an MBA in the fields of International Business and Finance (1984) with a thesis project on currency risk management at the United Nations Development Program (UNDP).

Early in his career, Erkan had extensive experience in the transportation, petroleum and manufacturing sectors. He entered the capital markets in 1989 as a research analyst working with foreign institutional investors. Subsequently, he worked as a research analyst on a retainer basis for Bankers Trust following various sectors in the capital markets of Turkey between 1992 and 1993. He became a partner and deputy chairman to Tezal Securities in Istanbul for two years and left the company prior to joining the ISE in 1994.

After working some years in the private sector, Hüseyin Erkan worked between 1994 and 1996 as director of research and international markets at the ISE. In 1995 he was promoted to executive vice chairman at ISE and in 1996 to deputy CEO. He worked at this position until 2006, and was at the same time board member of Takasbank, the Settlement and Custody Bank of ISE.

During his tenure at ISE, Erkan had additional responsibilities as a member of the executive board of the Turkish-Japanese Business Counsel; co-director of projects with the OECD in SME financing and best practices for developing stock exchanges; representative of ISE at FEAS and other organisations such as the International Organization of Securities Commissions (IOSCO), the World Federation of Exchanges (WFE), as well as being the Joint Project Coordinator of Southeast European Cooperative Initiative (SECI) to implement a cooperation Project for the securities markets in the Balkans. He also initiated a project for the cooperation of securities markets of the Islamic countries in COMCEC Subcommittee under the Organisation of the Islamic Conference (OIC).

Prior to his appointment as the chairman and chief executive officer of the Istanbul Stock Exchange by the Turkish Government, Erkan was the chief advisor to the board of Konya Sugar Company, the largest private sector group of companies in sugar refining and agricultural products in Turkey. He was responsible for restructuring the group's activities.

On 2 November 2007 Hüseyin Erkan was appointed chairman and CEO of the same institution for five years replacing Osman Birsen.

Erkan was elected as a board member of the World Federation of Exchanges (WFE) in October 2008 and was a board member through the end of 2011, when his term of office ended at the Istanbul Stock Exchange. In June 2012, Erkan was officially appointed to the position of secretary general of the WFE, until the 52nd WFE General Assembly in October 2012, when a new structure for the organization, creating the positions of chief executive officer (CEO) and chief operating officer (COO), was officially ratified. Erkan was then appointed as the new chief executive officer, a position he held until October 2014.

Hüseyin Erkan was elected as an Independent Member of the Board of Directors of Lydia Holding Corp. in Istanbul, Turkey on May 4, 2026.

== Personal life ==
Hüseyin Erkan is married and has two children. He speaks English.

== Citations ==
- Hüseyin Erkan to retire as chief executive of WFE, Financial Times, 10/27/2014, retrieved 04/07/2015.
- WFE Appoints Hüseyin Erkan as new Secretary General, World Federation of Exchanges (English), 06/18/2012, retrieved 01/22/2013.
- WFE names Erkan as new chief, Financial Times (English), 06/18/2012, retrieved 01/18/2013.
- Deutsche Börse man to head World Federation of Exchanges, Banking Technology, 10/15/2012, retrieved 01/18/2013.
- Istanbul bourse launches participation index, Hürriyet Daily News (English), 01/06/2011, retrieved 01/12/2011.
- Turkey's ISE aims to compete with European Stock Exchanges, World Bulletin (English), 01/04/2011, retrieved 01/05/2011.
- İMKB head says foreign hot money here for the long term, Today's Zaman (English), 12/25/2010, retrieved 12/25/2010.
- High demand shows robustness of Istanbul bourse, Hürriyet Daily News (English), 12/02/2010, retrieved 01/05/2011.
- Turkey launches joint investment fund with Greece, Hürriyet Daily News (English), 11/03/2010, retrieved 01/05/2011.
- Bourse chief expects nine more ipo's this year, Hürriyet Daily News (English), 10/26/2010, retrieved 01/05/2011.
- Hüseyin Erkan re-elected to global board, Hürriyet Daily News (English), 10/19/2010, retrieved 01/05/2011.
- Turkey to host key finance sector names in Istanbul summit, World Bulletin (English), 07/31/2010, retrieved 01/05/2011.
- Turkish-Greek stock exchange investment fund to be formed, World Bulletin (English), 06/17/2010, retrieved 01/05/2011.
- US dollar gains against Turkish lira, ISE drops, World Bulletin (English), 05/07/2010, retrieved 01/05/2011.
- Bourse launches initial public offering campaign, Hürriyet Daily News (English), 10/19/2009, retrieved 01/05/2011.
- Turkish-Greek stock funds on the way, Hürriyet Daily News (English), 10/13/2009, retrieved 01/05/2011.
- Euro-Asian bourses meet in Montenegro, Hürriyet Daily News (English), 09/30/2009, retrieved 01/05/2011.
- Athens, Istanbul create joint index, Hürriyet Daily News (English), 09/28/2009, retrieved 01/05/2011.
- 'Tug-o-war' between bourses continues, Hürriyet Daily News (English), 08/11/2009, retrieved 01/05/2011.

Government offices
Preceded by Osman Birsen	CEO of Istanbul Stock Exchange; 2007–2012	Succeeded by M. İbrahim Turhan
