= MİT Museum of Espionage =

Spy museum in Ankara, Turkey

- MİT Casusluk Müzesi
- Location: Ankara, Turkey
- Coordinates: 39°57′29″N 32°48′20″E
- Type: Espionage
- Key holdings: Spy equipment
- Owner: Milli İstihbarat Teşkilatı (MİT)

The MİT Museum of Espionage (Turkish: MİT Casusluk Müzesi) is a non-public museum owned by the Turkish National İntelligence Organization (Turkish: Milli İstihbarat Teşkilatı, MİT) and located in Ankara, Turkey. Situated within the campus of the MİT, it is dedicated to the history of espionage featuring a collection of spying equipment.

In 2011, during the celebration of MİT's 85th anniversary of foundation, it was learnt that the institution owns a spy museum. The internal museum opened its door for the first time to the public in history in October 2013 upon request by a major Turkish daily. Only historical spying artifacts used between World War II and the end of Cold War were on display while contemporary "top-secret" labeled instruments remained still locked up.

The instruments on display in glass cases, categorized as "technical documentation", consist of equipment for espionage techniques in voice (eavesdropping, call recording) and image processing (photograph, video frame) as well as monitoring (audio surveillance, wiretapping). The c.150 exhibited items include a voice-recording watch, a bug-hiding shoe wedge, a radio transmitter disguised as a personal weighing scale, holed iron bolts, soap and stone piece for hiding encrypted documents or codebook (block cipher) as well as various pieces of spying equipment in the form of utensils like pens, plug fuses, etc. Also bugs, detected in buildings of Turkish diplomatic missions abroad in the Cold War era between 1967 and 1989, are on display. The information about at which operation or where that espionage equipment is used is kept still secret.
