= İbrahim Kalın =

Turkish politician, bureaucrat and scholar (born 1971)

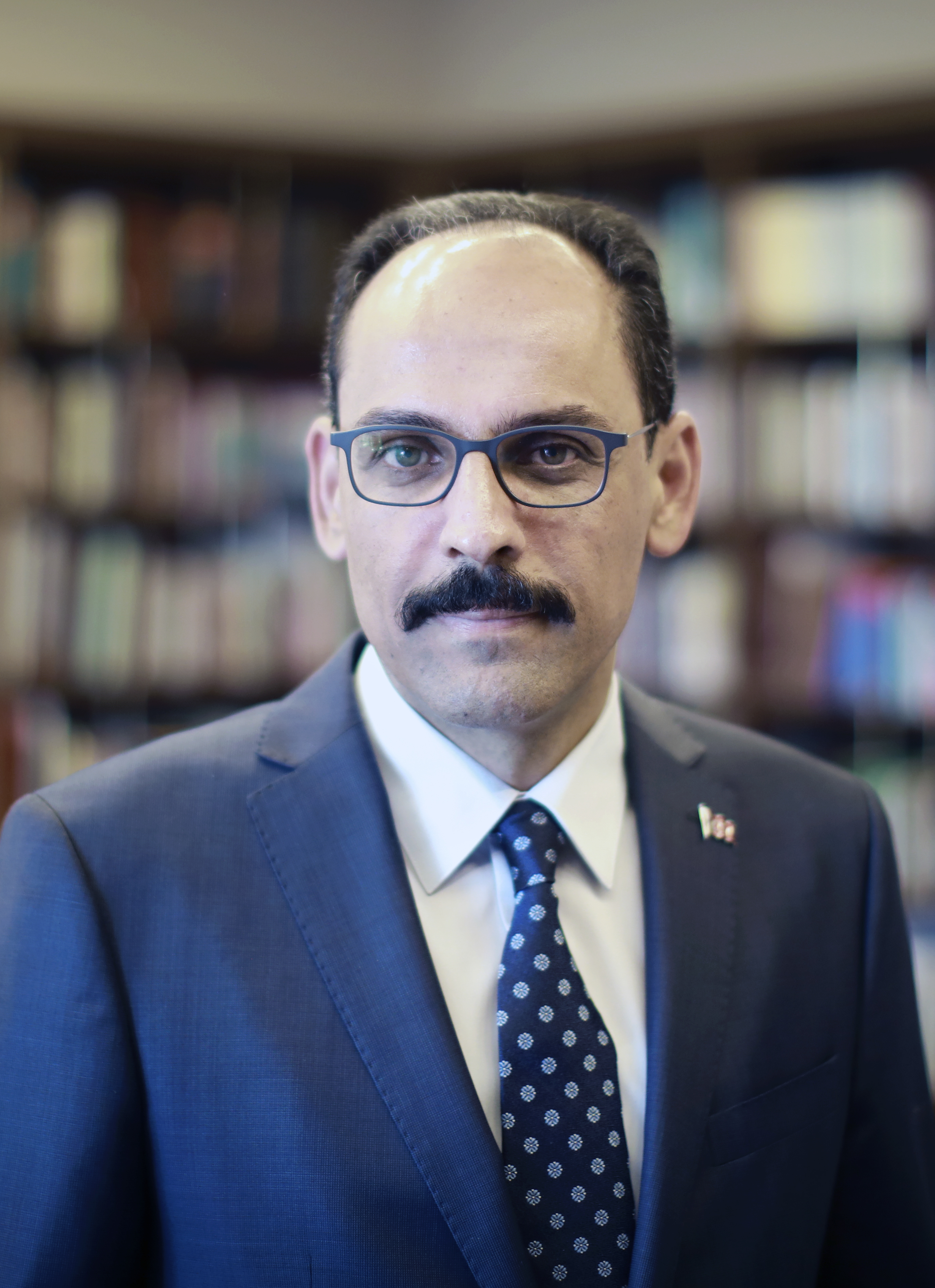
- Official portrait, 2018

Director of the National Intelligence Organization
- Incumbent
- Assumed office 5 June 2023
- President: Recep Tayyip Erdoğan
- Preceded by: Hakan Fidan

Spokesperson of the Presidency of Turkey
- In office 11 December 2014 – 4 June 2023
- President: Recep Tayyip Erdoğan
- Preceded by: Ahmet Sever

Assistant Secretary to the Prime Minister of Turkey
- In office 2012 – 11 December 2014
- Prime Minister: Recep Tayyip Erdoğan

Senior Advisor to the Prime Minister of Turkey
- In office 2009–2012
- Preceded by: Ahmet Davutoğlu
- Succeeded by: Kemal Ökem

Personal details
- Born: 15 September 1971 (age 55) Istanbul, Turkey
- Party: Justice and Development
- Children: 3
- Education: Istanbul University (BA); George Washington University (PhD)

İbrahim Kalın (born 15 September 1971) is a Turkish politician, bureaucrat and academic who is the current director of the National Intelligence Organization (MİT). An academic specialising in Islamic philosophy, Kalın received his doctorate at George Washington University under the supervision of Seyyed Hossein Nasr.

He previously served as Coordinator of the Office of Public Diplomacy, of which he was also a founder, Deputy Undersecretary for Foreign Relations and Public Diplomacy at the Office of the Prime Minister, Deputy Secretary General Responsible for Strategy and International Relations at the Office of the President, the presidential spokesperson and senior advisor to President Recep Tayyip Erdoğan from 2014 to 2023 and as the Deputy Chairman of the Council of Security and Foreign Policy in the Presidency of the Republic of Türkiye. He is a member of the European Council on Foreign Relations.

== Education and academic career ==
İbrahim Kalın was born in Istanbul into a family from Erzurum. Kalın received his B.A. in history from the Istanbul University Department of History and M.A. from International Islamic University Malaysia. In 2002, Kalın received a PhD in Islamic studies from George Washington University under the supervision of Islamic philosopher Seyyed Hossein Nasr. His dissertation was later published as Knowledge in Later Islamic Philosophy: Mullā Ṣadrā on Existence, Intellect, and Intuition.

From 2002 to 2005, he was a faculty member at the Department of Religious Studies at the College of the Holy Cross in Worcester, Massachusetts. He lectured on Islamic philosophy at Ibn Haldun University between 2019 and 2022, becoming a professor in 2020. He established and chaired (2005-2009) SETA Foundation (Foundation for Political, Economic, and Social Research) based in Ankara, Turkey. His academic interest is in post-Avicennan Islamic philosophy.

== Bureaucratic career ==
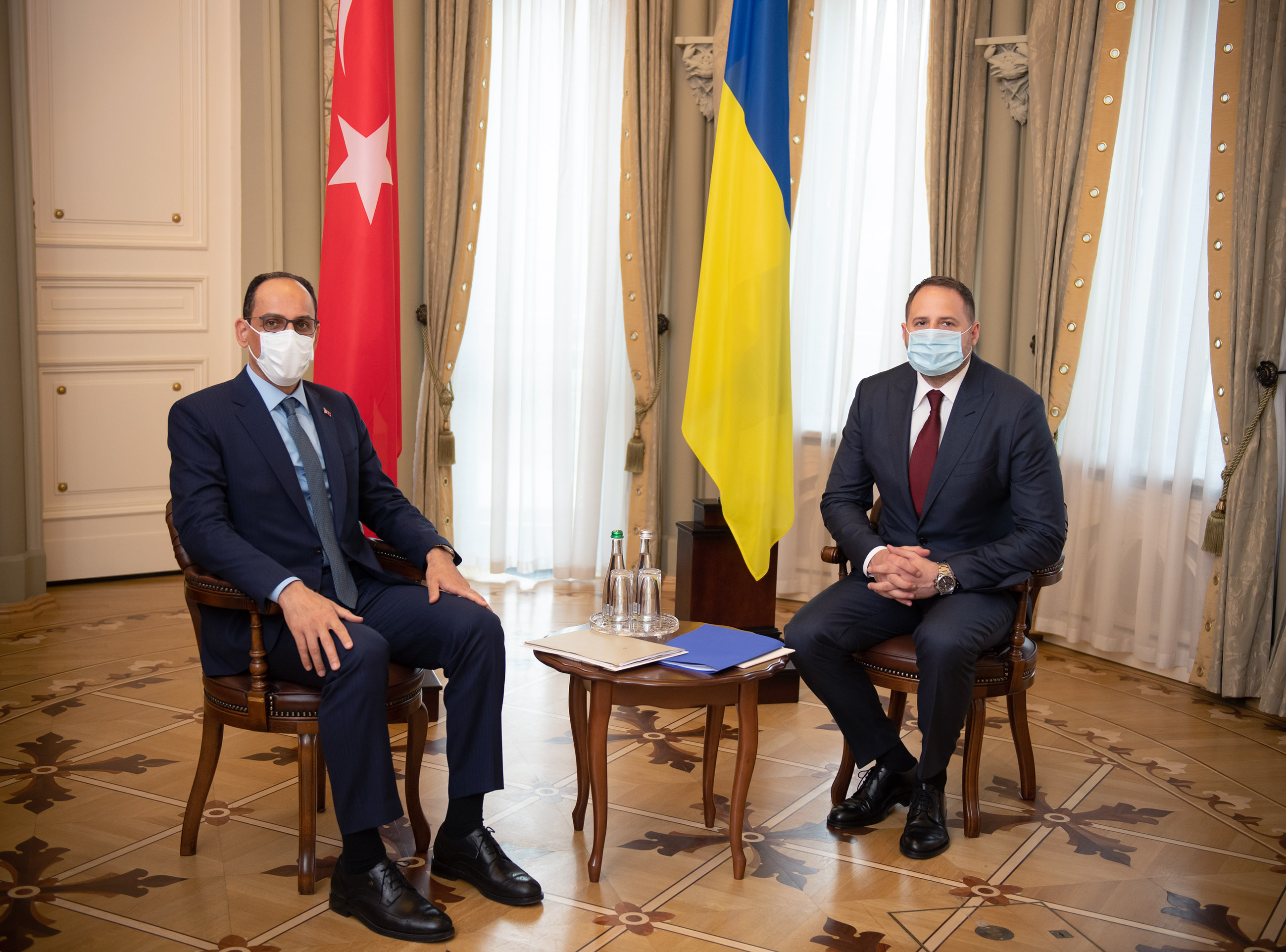
Kalın with Andriy Yermak, head of Office of the President of Ukraine, 2020

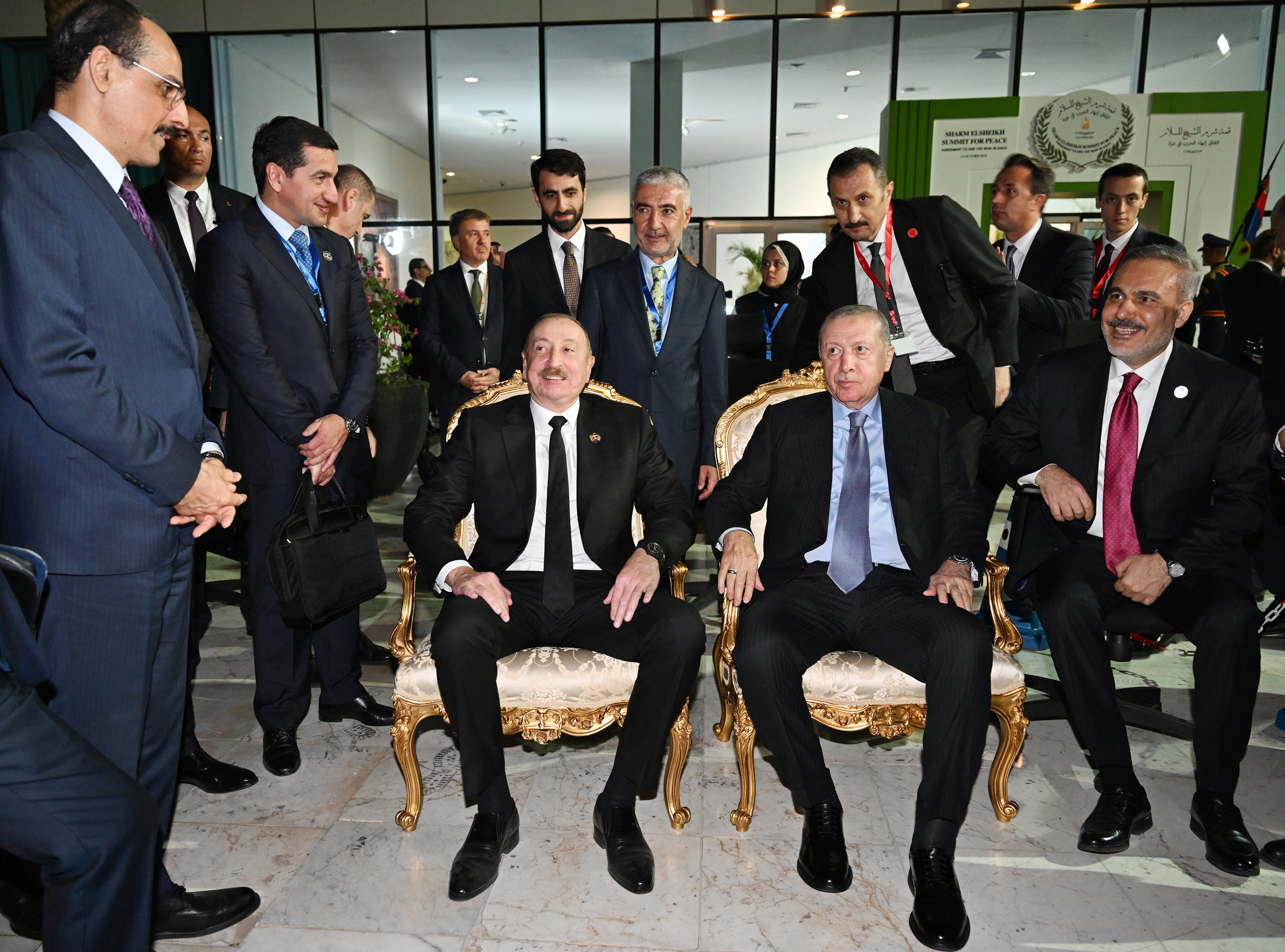
Kalın with and Recep Tayyip Erdoğan and Ilham Aliyev, presidents of Turkey and Azerbaijan, respectively, and the Turkish foreign minister, Hakan Fidan, 2025 Gaza peace summit.

From 2009 onwards İbrahim Kalın served as Chief Foreign Policy Advisor to the Prime Minister, Coordinator of the Office of Public Diplomacy, of which he was also a founder, Deputy Undersecretary for Foreign Relations and Public Diplomacy at the Office of the Prime Minister, Deputy Secretary General Responsible for Strategy and International Relations at the Office of the President, Acting Chairman of the Presidential Council for Security and Foreign Policies, and Chief Advisor for Security and Foreign Policies at the Office of the President, respectively. In addition to his duties in bureaucracy, he also continued to serve as Presidential Spokesperson, a position he had assumed in 2014 with the title of ambassador, until he was appointed as Director of the National Intelligence Organization. On June 5, 2023, Erdoğan appointed Kalın as director of the National Intelligence Organization.

== Controversies ==
=== Close ties to Erdoğan and the AKP ===
Kalin has served as Erdoğan’s chief adviser and presidential spokesperson, many regard him as a principal intellectual and institutional figure of the Erdoğan era. A recent 2026 study by the Oxford University place Kalin as one of the figures associated with the personalization and “neo-patrimonial” transformation of Turkey's foreign policy.

=== Islamism/“neo-Ottomanism" ===
As an academic specializing in Islamic philosophy he collaborated with Ahmet Davutoğlu in developing a narrative that emphasized Turkey's Ottoman heritage, it's Muslim identity and a civilizational role for the country in the region. Critics have argued that this worldview contributed to a broader shift in Turkish foreign policy, away from strictly secular, EU oriented orientation and toward one more shaped by Islamist and nationalist currents, with greater focus on the Middle East.

=== Role in defending Erdoğan’s government ===
As presidential spokesperson, Kalin frequently served as the international face of the government, defending Ankara against accusations of democratic backsliding, media repression and the concentration of power in the presidency. Some critics have described him less as an independent intellectual and more as an articulate defender of the Erdoğan government's position. Following the 2016 coup attempt, Kalin defended the government's purge of alleged Gülenists.

=== The post 2016 and the Gülen movement ===
Kalin has been an outspoken as proponent of the government's position that the Gülen movement was responsible for the coup attempt and constituted a deeply embedded network within the state. Critics of the Turkish government have objected to the scale of the subsequent purge, arguing that it was used to eliminate political opponents beyond those with demonstrable ties to the coup. According to the reporting in The New Yorker, Kalin advocated for pursuing individuals suspected of links to the movement.

== Personal life ==
His parents are from Erzurum. He is married and has three children. Kalın is also known for his artistic interests, particularly in Turkish folk music. He professionally plays the bağlama, sings, has composed original works and has music on YouTube with millions of views. In addition to his musical activities, Kalın is an avid photographer, noted for capturing images of natural landscapes and cultural scenes during his travels. Alongside his political career, he is recognized for his intellectual depth and artistic vision.

He speaks English, Arabic, Persian and French.

== Selected works ==
=== Books ===
- Kalın, İbrahim. İslam ve Batı. İstanbul: İSAM, 2007. ISBN 978-9-75-389879-9
- Bülbül, Kudret, Bekir Berat Özipek ve İbrahim Kalın, ed. Aşk ile Nefret Arasında Türkiye’de Toplumun Batı Algısı. Ankara: SETA, 2008. ISBN 978-6-05-005700-3
- Kalın, İbrahim. Knowledge in Later Islamic Philosophy: Mulla Sadra on Existence, Intellect and Intuition. New York: Oxford University Press, 2010. ISBN 978-0-19-973524-2
- Kalın, İbrahim. Akıl ve Erdem. İstanbul: Küre Yayınları, 2013. ISBN 978-9-75-574952-5
- M. Ghazi bin Muhammad, İbrahim Kalın ve Kalın, İbrahim. "M. Ghazi bin Muhammad and M. Hashim Kamali, ed. War, Peace in Islam: The Uses and Abuses of Jihad. Amman: MABDA, 2013. ISBN 978-1-90-368283-8
- Kalın, İbrahim, ed. The Oxford Encyclopedia of Philosophy, Science, and Technology in Islam. New York: Oxford University Press, 2014. ISBN 978-0-19-981257-8
- Sadra, Mulla. The Book of Metaphysical Penetrations, A Parallel English-Arabic Text of Kitab al-Masha’ir. Ed. İbrahim Kalın. Utah: Brigham Young University Press, 2014. ISBN 978-0-84-252839-9
- Kalın, İbrahim. Varlık ve İdrak: Molla Sadrâ’nın Bilgi Tasavvuru. Çev. Nurullah Koltaş. İstanbul: Klasik Yayınları, 2015. ISBN 978-6-05-524554-2
- Kalın, İbrahim. Ben, Öteki ve Ötesi: İslam-Batı İlişkileri Tarihine Giriş. İstanbul: İnsan Yayınları, 2016. ISBN 978-9-75-574805-4
- Kalın, İbrahim. Barbar, Modern, Medenî: Medeniyet Üzerine Notlar. İstanbul: İnsan Yayınları, 2018. ISBN 978-9-75-574887-0
- Kalın, İbrahim. Perde ve Mânâ: Akıl Üzerine Bir Tahlil. İstanbul: İnsan Yayınları, 2020. ISBN 978-9-75-574939-6
- Kalın, İbrahim. Açık Ufuk: İyi, Doğru ve Güzel Düşünme Üzerine. İstanbul: İnsan Yayınları, 2021. ISBN 978-9-75-574963-1
- Kalın, İbrahim. Gök Kubbenin Altında. İstanbul: Mecra Kitap, 2022. ISBN 978-6-05-712740-2

=== Book chapters ===
- Kalın, İbrahim. "The Sacred Versus the Secular: Nasr on Science.” Library of Living Philosophers: Seyyed Hossein Nasr. Ed. L. E. Hahn, R. E. Auxier and L. W. Stone. Chicago: Open Court Press, 2001, 445–462.
- Kalın, İbrahim. “Three Views of Science in the Islamic World.” God, Life, and the Cosmos: Christian and Islamic Perspectives. Ed. Ted Peters Muzaffar Iqbal and Syed Nomanul Haq. Oxford: Routledge, 2002, 19–53.
- Kalın, İbrahim. “Roots of Misconseption: Euro-American Perceptions of Islam Before and After September 11.” Islam, Fundamentalism, and the Betrayal of Tradition. Ed. Joseph E. B. Lumbard. Indiana: World Wisdom, 2009: 143–187.
- Kalın, İbrahim. “Islamophobia and the Limits of Multiculturalism.” Islamophobia and the Challenges of Pluralism in the 21st Century, Washington DC: Georgetown University Press, 2011, 50–61.
- Kalın, İbrahim. “The Ak Party in Turkey.” The Oxford Handbook of Islam and Politics. Ed. John L. Esposito and Emad El-Din Shahin. New York: Oxford University Press, 2013, 423–439.

=== Articles ===
- Kalın, İbrahim. “An Annotated Bibliography of the Works of Mullâ Sadrâ with a Brief Account of His Life.” Islamic Studies. 42/1 (2003): 21–62.
- Kalın, İbrahim. “Islam and Peace: A Survey of the Sources of Peace in the Islamic Tradition.” Islamic Studies. 44/3 (2005): 327–362.
- Kalın, İbrahim. “Debating Turkey in the Middle East: the Dawn of a New Geo-Political Imagination?” Insight Turkey. (2009): 83–96.
- Kalın, İbrahim. “Modern Dünyada Geleneksel İslâm’ın İzini Süren Bir Hakîm: Seyyid Hüseyin Nasr.” İş Ahlakı Dergisi. 2/3 (2009): 135–142.
- Kalın, İbrahim. “US-Turkish Relations under Obama: Promise, Challenge and Opportunity in the 21st Century.” Journal of Balkan and Near Eastern Studies. 12/1 (2010): 93–108.
- Kalın, İbrahim. “Soft Power and Public Diplomacy in Turkey.” Perceptions: Journal of International Affairs. 16/3 (2011): 5–23.
- Kalın, İbrahim. “Turkish Foreign Policy: Framework, Values, and Mechanisms.” International Journal. 67/1 (2012): 7–21.
- Kalın, İbrahim. “After the Coup Attempt, Turkey’s Success Story Continues.” Insight Turkey. 18/3 (2016): 11–17.
- Kalın, İbrahim. “Hoca Ahmed Yesevî, Hüküm ve Hikmet.” Bilig. 80 (2017): 1–14.

=== As contributor ===
- MacMillan Encyclopedia of Philosophy 2nd Edition
- MacMillan Encyclopedia of Religion 2nd Edition
- Biographical Encyclopedia of Islamic Philosophy
- Oxford Encyclopedia of the Islamic World

Political offices
Preceded by New title	Turkish Presidential Press Secretary; 2015–present	Incumbent
