= Zeki Akar =

High-ranked Turkish judge

Zeki Acar

10. First Deputy Chairman of the Supreme Court (Law)
- In office 13 February 2006 – 1 April 2009
- Preceded by: Mehmet Handan Surlu
- Succeeded by: Erdal Sanlı

Personal details
- Born: April 1, 1944 (age 82) Niksar, Tokat, Turkey

Zeki Akar (born April 1, 1944 in Niksar), is a Turkish judge and served as the first president of the Court of Cassation.
