= Hakan Fidan =

Turkish politician (born 1968)

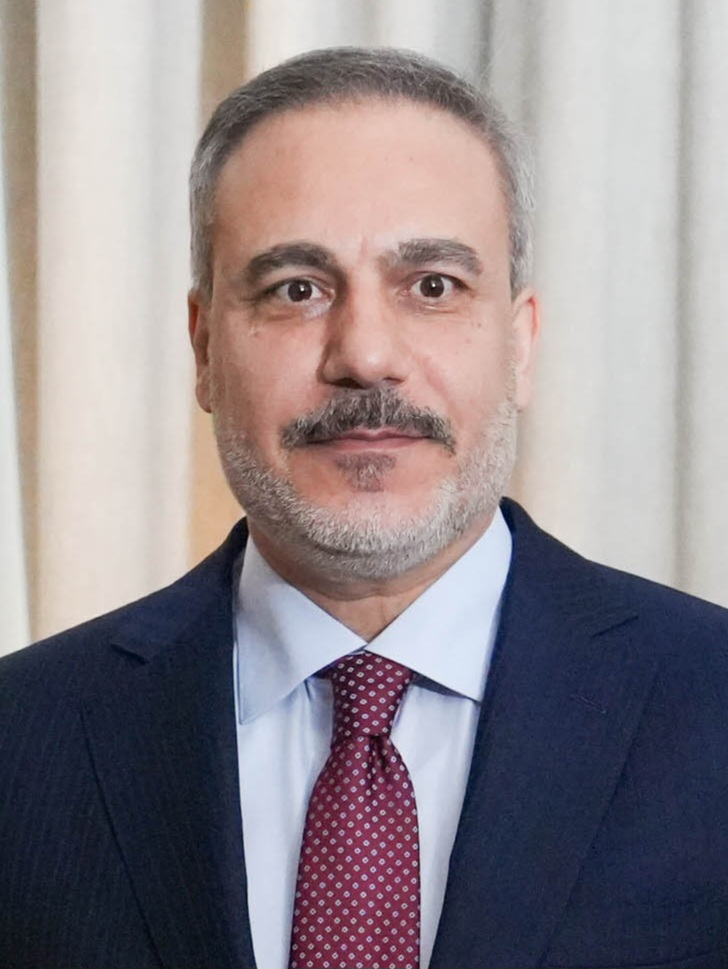
- Fidan in 2025

Minister of Foreign Affairs
- Incumbent
- Assumed office 4 June 2023
- President: Recep Tayyip Erdoğan
- Preceded by: Mevlüt Çavuşoğlu

Director of the National Intelligence Organization
- In office 9 March 2015 – 4 June 2023
- President: Recep Tayyip Erdoğan
- Prime Minister: Ahmet Davutoğlu; Binali Yıldırım
- Preceded by: İsmail Hakkı Musa
- Succeeded by: İbrahim Kalın
- In office 25 May 2010 – 10 February 2015
- President: Abdullah Gül; Recep Tayyip Erdoğan
- Prime Minister: Recep Tayyip Erdoğan; Ahmet Davutoğlu
- Preceded by: Emre Taner
- Succeeded by: İsmail Hakkı Musa

Personal details
- Born: 17 July 1968 (age 58) Ankara, Turkey
- Party: Justice and Development
- Spouse: Nuran Fidan
- Children: 3
- Education: University of Maryland (BA); Bilkent University (MA, PhD)
- Occupation: Intelligence officer; diplomat
- Awards: See below
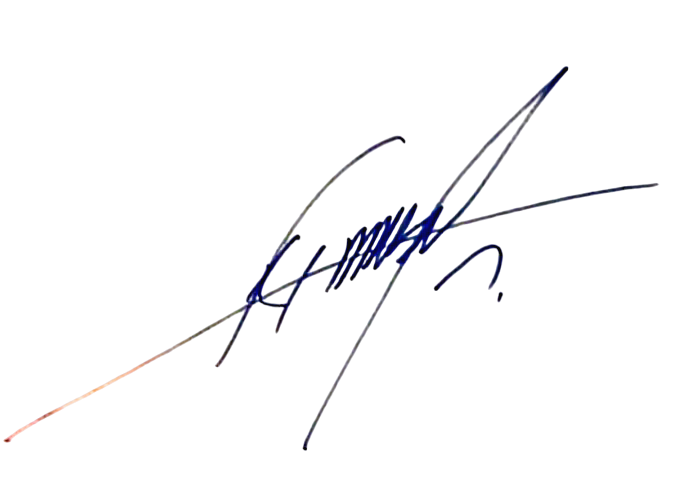
- Signature

Military service
- Allegiance: Turkey
- Branch/service: Turkish Land Forces
- Years of service: 1986–2001
- Rank: Staff Sergeant

Hakan Fidan (born 17 July 1968) is a Turkish politician serving as the Minister of Foreign Affairs since June 2023. He was previously the director of the National Intelligence Organization (MİT) from March 2010 until June 2023.

Fidan is seen as a possible successor to Recep Tayyip Erdoğan as the leader of the Justice and Development Party (AKP) and President of Turkey.

== Early life and education ==
Fidan was born in the Hamamönü quarter of Ankara on 17 July 1968 to a Kurdish father from Van province and a Turkish mother from Denizli. His father belongs to the Kurdish Hesenan tribe, whose head in 2023 claimed Hakan Fidan spoke Kurdish. He earned a degree in management and political science from the University of Maryland Global Campus and later completed his master's and doctorate at Bilkent University, with his 2006 PhD dissertation titled Diplomacy in the Information Age: The Use of Information Technologies in Verifying Treaties, a 319-page study analyzing the impact of the information revolution and digital tools on verifying international agreements.

== Military and early career ==
From 1986 to 2001, he served as a non-commissioned officer in the Turkish Land Forces and was part of the NATO-unit Allied Rapid Reaction Corps in Germany. Fidan directed the Turkish Cooperation and Coordination Agency (TIKA) from 2003 to 2007, focusing on development projects in Turkic and African countries. He also served as an assistant secretary in the prime ministry and as a security advisor for Recep Tayyip Erdoğan. Internationally, he held board positions at the International Atomic Energy Agency (IAEA) and the United Nations Industrial Development Organization (UNIDO).

== Intelligence career ==
Fidan led the National Intelligence Organization from May 2010 to February 2015, when he briefly resigned to pursue a parliamentary seat for the Justice and Development Party (AKP). After withdrawing his candidacy, he was reappointed to his intelligence position within hours.

=== Foreign relations ===
Fidan was instrumental in formulating Turkey's regional strategy of providing active support for Syrian rebels engaged in combat against the regime of Bashar al-Assad. His tenure saw a shift from a security cooperation with Israel and the United States towards one with Iran most notably Qasem Soleimani, the leader of the Al Quds division. During the 2016 Turkish coup attempt, Fidan played a crucial role in assisting Erdogan to suppress the coup. During the Munich Security Conference in February 2017, he delivered a list of 300 alleged supporters of the Gülen Movement to Bruno Kahl, president of the German Federal Intelligence Service (BND) in apparent expectation of cooperation during the political purges in Turkey following the failed coup attempt in July 2016. But the list much more lead the German authorities to warn the observed people from the Turkish intelligence service activities. In September 2022, he visited Hamis Hancer of the Sunni bloc in the Iraqi Parliament in Baghdad and also met with the Iraqi President Baram Salih.

=== Kurdish question ===
Fidan was involved in secret peace talks with the Kurdistan Workers' Party (PKK) for which in 2012 a state prosecutor wanted to investigate him. Recep Tayyip Erdoğan intervened on behalf of Fidan and he was later delegated to hold talks with Abdullah Öcalan and arranged the secret black marketing of Iran through Erdoğan's government.

== Foreign Minister (2023-Present) ==
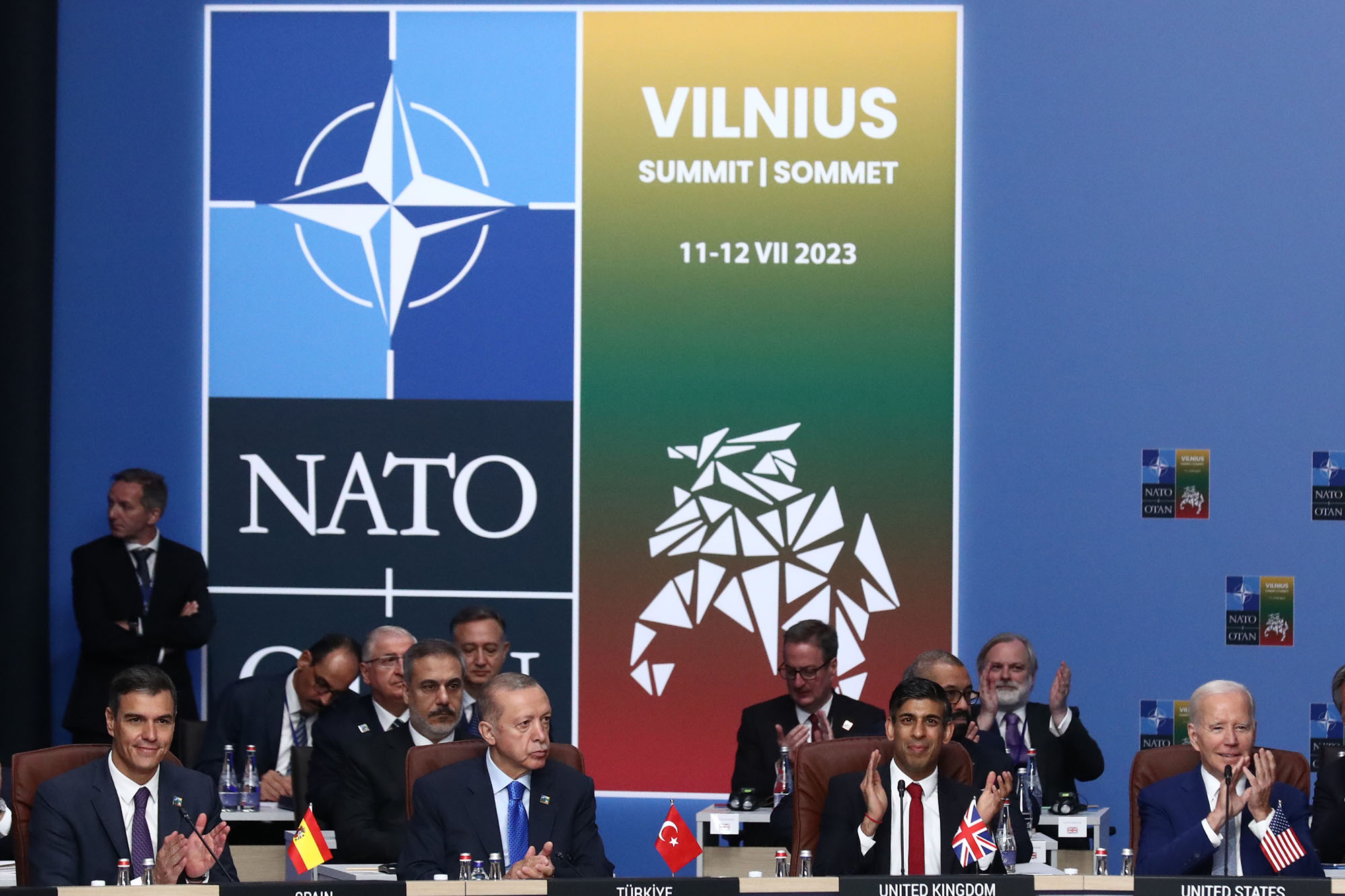
Fidan and Turkish President Recep Tayyip Erdoğan at the NATO Summit in Vilnius, 11 July 2023

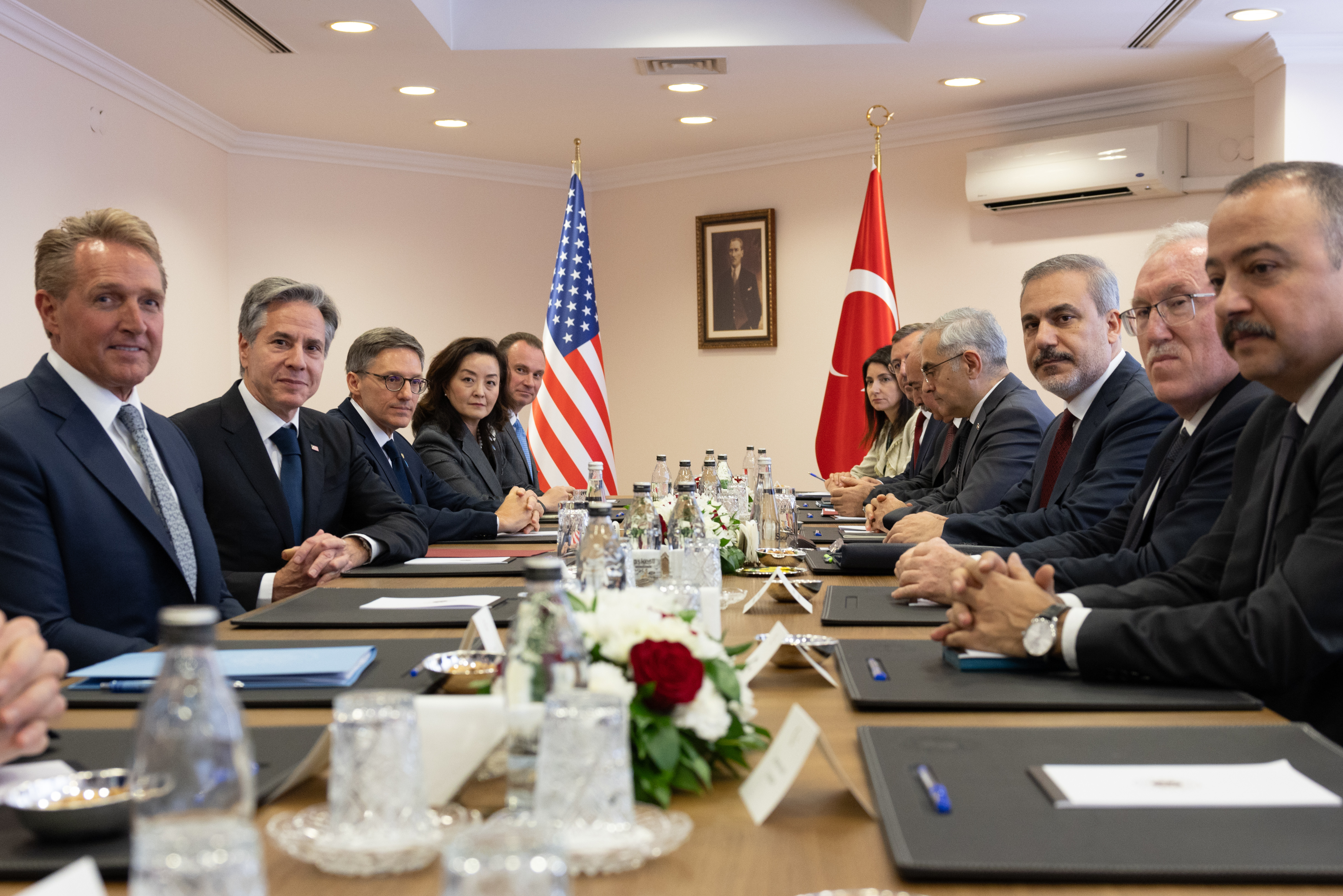
Fidan with U.S. Secretary of State Antony Blinken in Ankara, Turkey, 6 November 2023

On 4 June 2023, Fidan assumed office as Minister of Foreign Affairs in the 67th cabinet of Turkey under president Recep Tayyip Erdoğan. On 31 August 2023, he visited Moscow and met with Russian Foreign Minister Sergey Lavrov. They discussed the Black Sea Grain Initiative.

In September 2023, Azerbaijan launched a large-scale military offensive against the self-declared breakaway state of Artsakh, a move seen as a violation of the 2020 ceasefire agreement. Fidan offered diplomatic support to Azerbaijan, stating that their military operation was "justified" and that "Azerbaijan has taken the measures it deems necessary on its own sovereign territory."

On 25 October 2023, Fidan warned that an Israeli ground invasion of the Gaza Strip could turn into a massacre, saying that those supporting Israel's actions are "accomplices to its crimes."

In May 2025, Fidan revealed on the Turkish news channel, 24 TV, while he was the head of the National Intelligence Organization, he was a target of assassination attempt by arsenic and mercury poisoning.

In January 2026, Fidan stated that while the ongoing protests in Iran stem from "genuine reasons" and "structural problems" such as economic hardship, they are also being actively manipulated from abroad by Iran’s rivals. He explicitly named Israel's intelligence agency, Mossad, as a primary actor in this manipulation.

In July 2026, Fidan said of Israel “These people have become a burden that humanity can no longer bear. The human conscience cannot bear it, political systems cannot sustain it, and economic systems cannot sustain it either." These comments were condemned as antisemitic by President of Israel Isaac Herzog, and were described as "textbook incitement to genocide" by Israeli Foreign Minister Gideon Sa’ar. The German Foreign Minister Johann Wadephul described Fidan's statement as "utterly inappropriate." In the same month, Fidan stated that Turkey and Israel are not headed for conflict, responding to rising tensions between the two nations. In an interview, Fidan remarked that there is “no reason to have an open conflict” and noted that some Israeli politicians use anti-Turkey rhetoric as they approach elections, suggesting that Turkey has become a target among these politicians. He acknowledged that not all Israeli leaders share this sentiment, saying that rational voices are still present in Israel. On 22 November 2026, he claimed that Israel has a plan to conduct an operation in Syria, under the excuse of helping the Druze, as a "provocation against the Syrian army". He also addressed the issue of deploying Turkish troops in Yemen, saying there is no decision on the subject, but Turkey is assisting Saudi Arabia in every necessary way.

== Personal life ==
He is married to Nuran Fidan and is the father of 3 children.

== Published works ==
Resarch articles he authored or co-authored include "Turkish foreign policy towards Central Asia" (Journal of Balkan and Near Eastern Studies, 2010) and "Turkey and Eurasia: Frontiers of a new geographic imagination" (with Bulent Aras, New perspectives on Turkey, 2015.)

== Awards and decorations ==
Fidan has been awarded the:

- Turkey: State Medal of Distinguished Service
- Ukraine: Order of Merit, 2nd Class

Political offices
Preceded by Mevlüt Çavuşoğlu	Minister of Foreign Affairs; 2023–present	Incumbent
