= Şenkal Atasagun =

Turkish civil servant

Chief of the National Intelligence Organization of Turkey
- In office 11 February 1998 – 11 June 2005
- President: Süleyman Demirel; Ahmet Necdet Sezer
- Prime Minister: Mesut Yılmaz; Bülent Ecevit; Abdullah Gül; Recep Tayyip Erdoğan
- Preceded by: Sönmez Köksal
- Succeeded by: Emre Taner

Personal details
- Born: 17 August 1941 (age 85) Kars, Turkey
- Education: Galatasaray High School
- Alma mater: Grenoble University
- Occupation: Civil servant; intelligence officer

Şenkal Atasagun (born 17 August 1941) is a former Turkish civil servant. He was head of the National Intelligence Organization (Turkish: Milli İstihbarat Teşkilatı, MİT) from 1998 to 2005.

== Biography ==
Atasagun was born in Kars on 17 August 1941.

He joined MIT in 1967 after graduating from Galatasaray High School and Grenoble University. During his career he served in Brussels and London as well as Istanbul and Ankara, before being appointed head of MİT in 1998.
