= Sönmez Köksal =

Turkish civil servant (born 1940)

Chief of the National Intelligence Organization of Turkey
- In office 9 November 1992 – 11 February 1998
- President: Turgut Özal; Süleyman Demirel
- Prime Minister: Süleyman Demirel; Tansu Çiller; Necmettin Erbakan; Mesut Yılmaz
- Preceded by: Teoman Koman
- Succeeded by: Şenkal Atasagun

Personal details
- Born: 8 March 1940 (age 86)
- Spouse: Filiz Akın (m. 1994; died 2025)
- Education: Lycée Saint-Joseph, Istanbul
- Alma mater: Faculty of Political Science, Ankara University
- Occupation: Civil servant

Sönmez Köksal (born 8 March 1940) is a career Turkish civil servant. He served in a variety of positions largely in the Ministry of Foreign Affairs and in international organisations representing Turkey, and was Turkey's Ambassador to Iraq (1986–1990). He was head of the National Intelligence Organization (Turkish: Milli İstihbarat Teşkilatı, MİT) from 1992 to 1998, and subsequently Turkey's Ambassador to France (1998–2002). Köksal was the first civilian head of the MIT, breaking the tradition of appointing generals.
