= Teoman Koman =

Turkish general (c. 1936 – 2013)

General Commander of the Gendarmerie of Turkey
- In office 30 August 1995 – 29 August 1997
- Preceded by: Aydın İlter
- Succeeded by: Fikret Boztepe

Head of the National Intelligence Organization
- In office 29 August 1988 – 27 August 1992
- President: Kenan Evren; Turgut Özal
- Preceded by: Hayri Ündül
- Succeeded by: Sönmez Köksal

Personal details
- Born: c. 1936 Istanbul
- Died: 14 December 2013 (aged 77)
- Education: Turkish Military Academy

Military service
- Allegiance: Turkey
- Branch/service: Turkish Land Forces
- Years of service: 1956–1997
- Rank: General

Teoman Koman (c. 1936 – 14 December 2013) was a Turkish general who retired in 1997. He was general commander of the Gendarmerie of Turkey (1995–1997) and previously head of the National Intelligence Organization (1988–1992) and deputy secretary-general of the National Security Council (1986–1988).

Koman was charged with being involved with the 1997 military memorandum. Koman told the Ergenekon trials that he was aware of the existence of the JITEM during his tenure, and that it was an unofficial association of Gendarmerie members, which he had banned.
