= Uğur Işıkal =

Turkish footballer

Personal information
- Date of birth: 15 April 1985 (age 41)
- Place of birth: Karşıyaka, Turkey
- Height: 1.75 m (5 ft 9 in)
- Position: Forward

Youth career
- –2000: Karşıyaka
- 2000–2001: Denizspor
- 2001–2003: Karşıyaka

Senior career*
Years	Team	Apps	(Gls)
2003–2006	Karşıyaka	29	(5)
2006–2009	İstanbul B.B.	15	(6)
2009–2010	Boluspor	26	(6)
2010–2011	Göztepe	11	(1)
2011–2012	Gaziantep B.B.	14	(0)
2012–2013	Giresunspor	24	(4)
2013–2014	Eyüpspor	26	(6)
2014–2015	Pendikspor	33	(4)
2015–2017	Kocaeli Birlik Spor	63	(6)
2017–2019	Esenler Erokspor	22	(3)
2019	Tepecikspor	11	(2)
2019–2020	HEASK	10	(1)
2021	Sancaktepe	13	(2)
2022	Sancaktepe	7	(0)

International career
2003–2004	Turkey U19	19	(1)
2005	Turkey U20	3	(0)
- * Club domestic league appearances and goals

Uğur Işıkal (born 15 April 1985) is a Turkish professional former footballer. He is the son of Mehmet Işıkal, defender of legendary squad of Göztepe.

== Career ==
He appeared in fifteen Süper Lig matches during the 2007–08 and 2008–09 seasons with İstanbul B.B.
