= Uğur İbrahimhakkıoğlu =

Turkish judge (born 1944)

Uğur İbrahimhakkıoğlu (Turkish: [uːɾ ibɾaːˈhimhakːɯ.oːɫu]; born July 2, 1944 in Istanbul) is a high-ranked Turkish judge and the Secretary General of the Court of Cassation.
