= Emre Taner =

Former head of the Turkish National Intelligence Organisation

Chief of the National Intelligence Organization of Turkey
- In office June 15, 2005 – June 4, 2010
- President: Abdullah Gül
- Prime Minister: Recep Tayyip Erdoğan
- Preceded by: Şenkal Atasagun
- Succeeded by: Hakan Fidan

Personal details
- Born: 1942 (age 83–84) Diyarbakır, Turkey
- Education: Faculty of Political Science, Ankara University
- Occupation: Civil servant; intelligence officer

Emre Taner (born 1942) is a Turkish civil servant who was until May 2010 the undersecretary (i.e. chief) of the governmental intelligence agency of Turkey, the National Intelligence Organization (Turkish: Milli İstihbarat Teşkilatı, MİT).

== Career ==
After graduating from the Faculty of Political Science at Ankara University, he entered the intelligence agency in 1967 and served almost in all the sections of the organization. Between 1984 and 1986, Emre Taner was the chief of Istanbul region bureau. In 1987, he became the head of intelligence department, and was appointed Deputy Undersecretary of MİT in 1992. From 1994 on, Emre Taner served in foreign countries until his appointment to Deputy Undersecretary for Operations on April 7, 1999. Emre Taner succeeded Şenkal Atasagun, who retired on June 15, 2005 from his post before his term of office. Taner announced a restructuring of the MİT at the start of 2009. On May 26, 2010, Taner passed the post on to his successor Hakan Fidan.

=== Head of the National Intelligence Organization ===
He is known for rejuvenating the organization, and encouraging the government to adopt a more active stance with regard to foreign policy. Besides he is credited with reducing the turf war between the MİT and the General Directorate of Security as well as infighting inside the MİT itself. Between 2008 and 2009 he was involved in the peace negotiations with members of the outlawed Kurdistan Workers' Party (PKK) which took place in Oslo, Norway and Kurdish leaders in Iraq. Due to this peace talks with the PKK he and his successor Fidan were summoned in testify by prosecutor Sadrettin Sarıkaya in early February 2012. Sarikaya was arrested the same month and the law concerning investigations on the MIT was changed in way that the prime ministers consent was mandatory. The warrant on him was removed on the 18 February 2012.

== Personal life ==
He was born 1942 in Diyarbakır. He is married.

Preceded by Şenkal Atasagun	Chief of the MİT; June 15, 2005 – June 4, 2010	Succeeded by Hakan Fidan
