= Osman Arslan =

Turkish civil servant

Osman Arslan (born December 21, 1942, in Kalecik, Ankara) is a former high ranked Turkish judge. He served as the First President of the Court of Cassation of Turkey from December 2, 2004 until he retired on December 21, 2007 due to the mandated retirement age of 65.
