= Osman Birsen =

Turkish civil servant

- Born: 1945 (age 80–81); Ankara, Turkey
- Occupation: the CEO of the Istanbul Stock Exchange

Osman Birsen (born 1945) is a Turkish high-ranking civil servant for finance and was the CEO of the Istanbul Stock Exchange between 1997 and 2007.

Birsen was born in Ankara, Turkey. After finishing high school at Ankara Deneme Lisesi, he studied Economics and Finance at the University of Ankara and graduated in 1968. During his education time, Birsen played basketball in the school and university teams.

After graduation, he was employed as an inspector at the Ministry of Finance, where he served as chief inspector later from 1971 to 1979. He was then sent to the United Kingdom for an internship. On his return, Osman Birsen was appointed Deputy General Director of the Banking and Foreign Exchange Department at the Ministry of Finance. Birsen also served as Senior Advisor to the Minister of Finance in 1980–1981. Between 1983 and 1986, he worked as Financial Counselor to the Turkish Embassy in Washington D.C., United States. He returned to Turkey in 1987 and was appointed Director-General of Public Finance, where he served until 1989. During this period, he was also member of the Board of Directors of the Turkish Electricity Authority (TEK). Between 1989 and 1993, he served as Deputy Permanent Representative of the Turkish Delegation to the OECD in Paris, France. In October 1993, following his return to Turkey, he was appointed Assistant Secretary to the Prime Ministry responsible for economic coordination. In 1994, he was promoted to the Undersecretary of Treasury and Foreign Trade, where he served until the splitting of that institution. Between 1995 and 1997, he worked in the private sector as a member of the board of the now defunct Iktisat Bank.

Birsen was appointed chairman and CEO of the Istanbul Stock Exchange (ISE) on October 25, 1997, for a term of five years and was re-confirmed in 2002 in this position for another five-years term. He was also the Chairman of the ISE Settlement and Custody Bank (Turkish: Takasbank) and President of the Federation of Euro-Asian Stock Exchanges (FEAS).

Government offices
Preceded by Tuncay Artun	CEO of Istanbul Stock Exchange; Oct 25, 1997–Oct 24, 2007	Succeeded by Hüseyin Erkan
