= National Security Service (Turkey) =

Turkish intelligence agency from 1926 to 1965

- Milli Emniyet Hizmeti

Agency overview
- Formed: 6 January 1926
- Preceding agencies: Teşkilât-ı Mahsûsa; Sentinel Association
- Dissolved: 1965
- Superseding agency: National Intelligence Organization
- Jurisdiction: Government of Turkey

The National Security Service (Turkish: Milli Emniyet Hizmeti, MEH, but known as MAH^{¶}) was the governmental intelligence organization of Turkey between 1926 and 1965, when it was replaced by the National Intelligence Organization (Turkish: Millî İstihbarat Teşkilâtı, MİT).

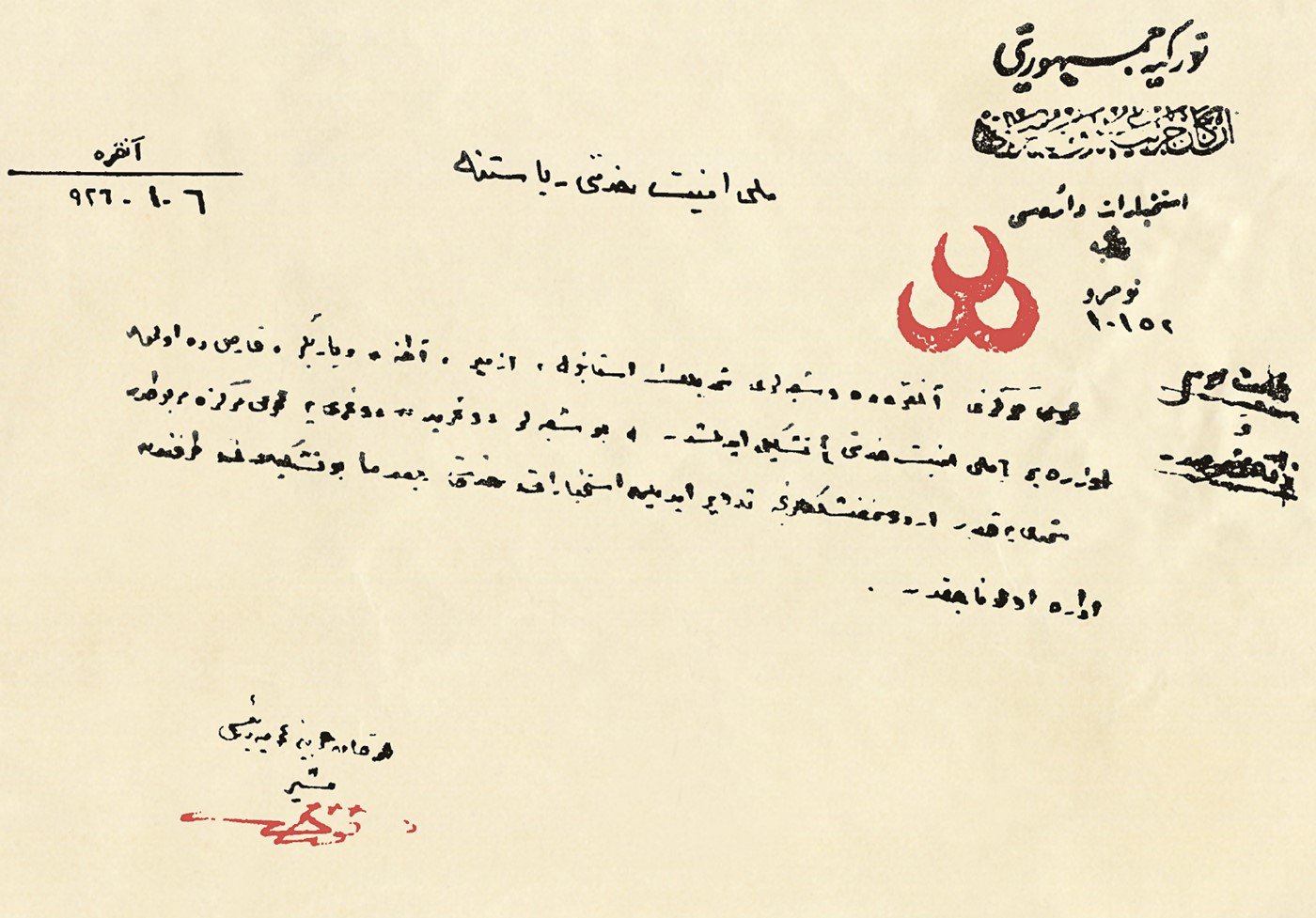
The establishment document, dated 6 January 1926.

It was established at a time when Mustafa Kemal Atatürk was purging Committee of Union and Progress elements, including the Karakol society and Teşkilât-ı Mahsûsa ("Special Organization") intelligence organizations. The first director of the MAH was Şükrü Âli Ögel (1886–1973).

During World War II, Turkey saw increased espionage by British, Soviet, and German operatives and sympathizers. The MAH learned that Nazi Germany would not attempt to invade Turkey, allowing the İnönü administration to resist mounting Allied pressure to declare war on Germany.

The MAH would go on to receive significant financial support from the CIA during the Cold war.

== Directors ==
- Şükrü Âli Ögel (25 December 1926 – 7 July 1941)
- Mehmet Naci Perkel (1 August 1941 – 3 September 1953)
- Behçet Türkmen (September 3, 1953 – March 27, 1957)
- Emin Çobanoğlu (27 March 1957 – 18 April 1957)
- Ahmet Salih Korur (18 April 1957 – 23 September 1957)
- Emin Çobanoğlu (23 September 1957 – 21 November 1957)
- Hüseyin Avni Göktürk (November 21, 1957 – June 21, 1959)
- Ahmet Salih Korur (21 June 1959 – 2 October 1959)
- Ahmet Celalettin Karasapan (2 October 1959 – 2 June 1960)
- Ziya Selyshyk (June 3, 1960 – January 17, 1961)
- Naci Ashkun (January 17, 1961 – August 18, 1962)
- Mehmet Fuat Doğu (August 27, 1962 - August 25, 1964)
- Ziya Selyshyk (29 August 1964 – 13 June 1965)

== Notes ==
- ^¶ The early Turkish government named the organization MAH, without expanding the acronym, so unauthorized persons would not be able to guess what the organization was responsible for. This gave rise to incorrect backronyms such as Millî Amale Hizmeti and Millî Asayiş Hizmeti.
