= Mehmet Akarca =

Turkish judge

Mehmed Akarca

President of the Court of Cassation in Turkey
- Incumbent
- Assumed office 24 March 2020

Personal details
- Born: 21 January 1963 (age 63) Şirvan, Siirt
- Occupation: Judge

Mehmet Akarca (born 21 January 1963 in Şirvan, Turkey) is a jurist, a former state prosecutor and the current President of the Court of Cassations in Turkey.

== Education and early life ==
He attended high school in Karşıyaka and following studied law at the Dokuz Eylül University from which he graduated in 1986. He entered the public administration, where he worked as a judge in courts in several cities throughout Turkey. During his career he served as the President of the Heavy Penal Court in Sivas and Kütahya and the High Criminal Court in Izmir.

== Court of Cassation ==
Mehmet Akarca, elected as a member of the Court of Cassation on 18 January 2010 and became the President of the 14th Chamber of the Court of Cassations in October 2013. He was elected as the head State Prosecutor of the Court of Cassation on the 18 May 2015 by President Recep Tayyip Erdoğan among the candidates nominated by the Grand General Assembly of the Supreme Court of Appeals. As the state prosecutor he filed a lawsuit demanding the closure of four pro-Kurdish political parties. In March 2020, he was elected the President of the Court of Cassations.

== Personal life ==
He is married and has two children.
