= Şükrü Âli Ögel =

Turkish politician (1886–1973)

Şükrü Ali Öğel
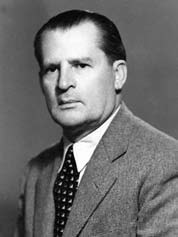

Head of National Security Service
- In office 25 December 1926 – 7 July 1941
- Succeeded by: Mehmet Naci Perkel

Personal details
- Born: 1886 Trebinje, Condominium of Bosnia and Herzegovina, (de jure Ottoman Empire, de facto Austria-Hungary)
- Died: 1 June 1973 (aged 86–87) Istanbul, Turkey
- Education: Turkish Military Academy

Military service
- Allegiance: Ottoman Empire; Turkey (from 1921)
- Branch/service: Turkish Land Forces
- Years of service: 1909–1936
- Rank: Colonel

Şükrü Âli Ögel (1886–1973) was a Turkish career officer, politician and the first director of the former Turkish governmental intelligence agency the National Security Service (Turkish: Milli Emniyet Hizmeti), the predecessor of the National Intelligence Organization (Turkish: Milli İstihbarat Teşkilatı) today.

== Biography ==
Born in 1886 in Trebinje of Turkish descent, he attended the Turkish Military Academy and joined the Ottoman army on 13 August 1909 in the rank of a second lieutenant. Şükrü Âli served as a staff officer and fought the invading Greek Army in the Western Front during the Turkish War of Independence.

He took part in the foundation of the intelligence organization Milli Emniyet Hizmeti (MAH), and was appointed on 25 December 1926 its first director. He retired from military service on 22 December 1936 as he was in the rank of a colonel, but kept his position at the MAH.

On 25 May 1937, Ögel entered the Turkish Grand National Assembly as the deputy of Istanbul. With the approval of the prime minister, he continued his position as chief of the intelligence agency beside his membership in the parliament. He quit from the MAH on 7 July 1941 after a dispute with the prime minister Refik Saydam.

He died on 1 June 1973.
