= Nuri Ok =

Turkish judge (1942–2015)

Nuri Ok (November 10, 1942 – August 5, 2015) was a Turkish judge. He retired as the Chief Public Prosecutor of the Court of Cassation of Turkey. Ok was born in Tarsus, a town in the Mersin Province.
