= Court of Cassation (Turkey) =

Turkish supreme court

- Yargıtay
- Seal of the Court of Cassation

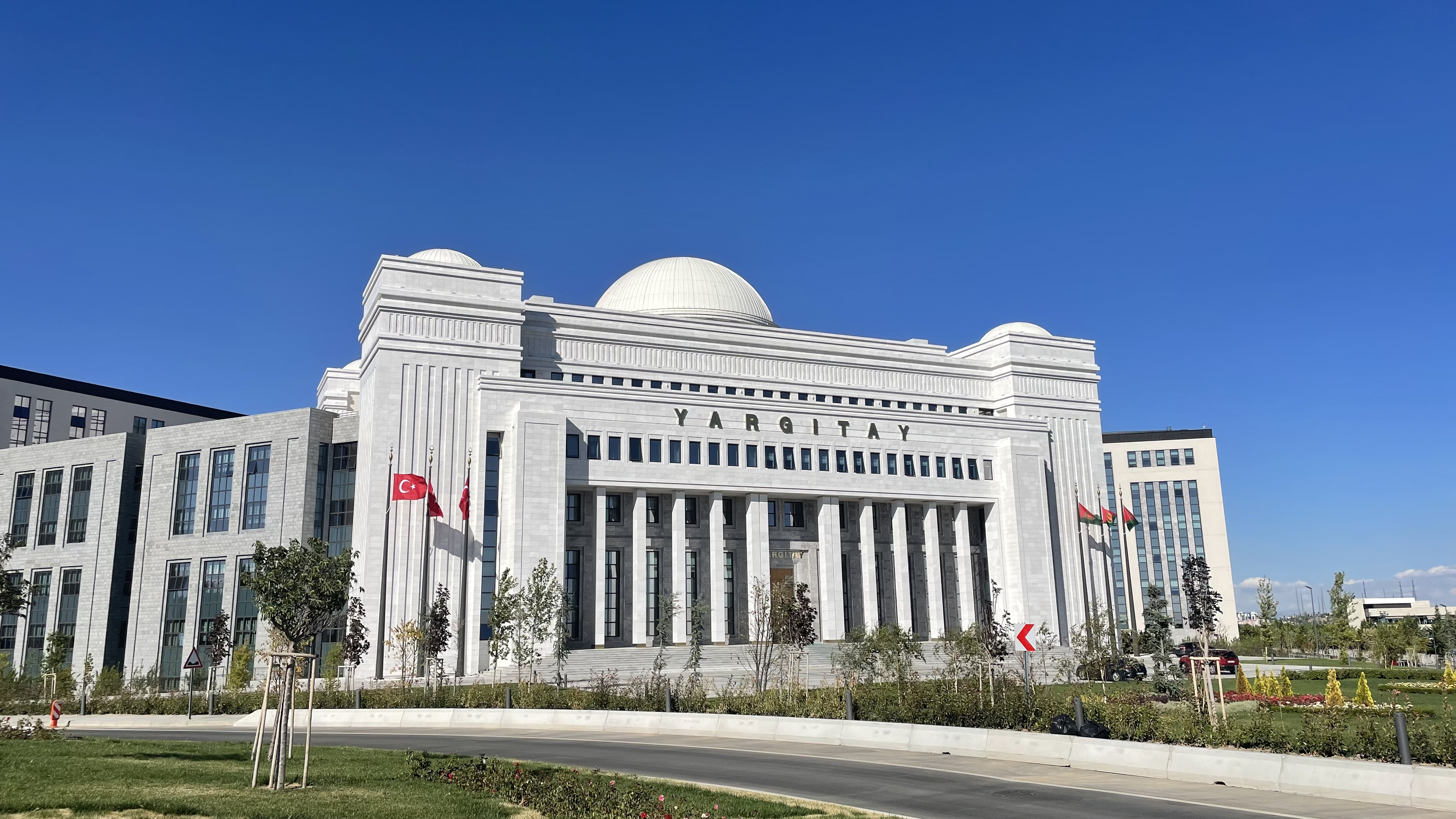
- Interactive map of Court of Cassation
- 39°50′43″N 32°47′10″E
- Established: 6 March 1868; 158 years ago
- Jurisdiction: Turkey
- Location: Ankara
- Coordinates: 39°50′43″N 32°47′10″E
- Number of positions: 30 chambers of five members
- Website: yargitay.gov.tr

First President (Birinci Başkan)
- Currently: Ömer Kerkez

The Court of Cassation, officially called the Supreme Court of Appeals of the Republic of Turkey (Turkish: Türkiye Cumhuriyeti Yargıtay Başkanlığı – Yargıtay for short), is the last instance for reviewing verdicts given by courts of criminal and civil justice in Turkey.

== History ==
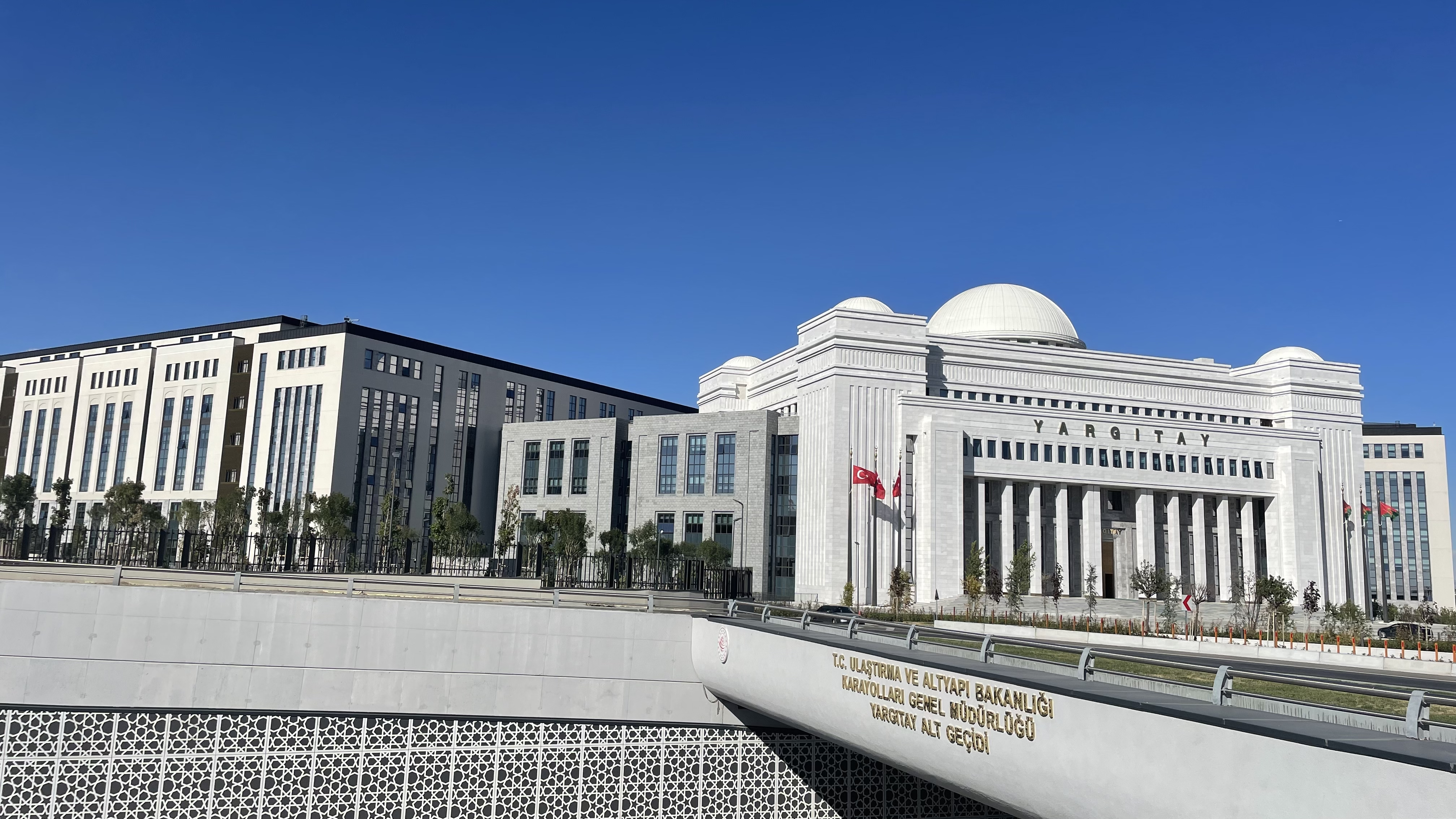
The building of the Turkish Court of Cassation in Ankara

The institution of the court of appeals was Divan in the Ottoman Empire until the 19th century. The first modern court of appeals, Divan-ı Ahkam-ı Adliye, which was the first form of today's Yargıtay, was established during the reign of Abdülaziz on 6 March 1868. There are different views on the date of foundation. Some jurists hold that 6 March 1868, when the Padishah announced his will, is the founding date, while others hold that 1 April 1868, when the statute of the court was passed, is the founding date. Its first president was Ahmet Cevdet Pasha, the governor of Aleppo. The high court was composed of members from Muslim and non-Muslim communities in a ratio of two thirds and one third, respectively. The name Divan-ı Ahkam-ı Adliye was changed on 18 June 1879, to Mahkeme-i Temyiz (Appeal Court) by an act on foundation of courts.

During the Turkish War of Independence, the Mahkeme-i Temyiz transferred its case files to a Temporary Committee of Appeals (Muvakkat Temyiz Heyeti), which was formed on 7 June 1920, in Sivas by the Ankara Government, the body that replaced the government in Istanbul following the dissolution of the Ottoman Empire. On 7 June 1920, the Grand National Assembly of Turkey passed a law that established four chambers for appeal cases referring to civil, criminal, religious justice and one for petitions. The Court of Cassation in Istanbul continued to exist. When Istanbul came under the reign of the national government on 4 November 1922, the courts were united by transferring the files from Istanbul to Sivas. The Temporary Committee of Appeals moved from Sivas to Eskişehir on 14 November 1923, due to better transportation potential. At the same time, the committee's name was changed to Court of Appeals (Temyiz Mahkemesi).

In 1935, the Supreme Court of Appeals moved to its new building in Ankara, which was built by the renowned Austrian architect Clemens Holzmeister. On 10 January 1945, the name of the "Court of Appeals" was changed to "Court of Cassation" (Yargıtay). The latest act (Law 2797) related to the Court of Cassation is from 4 February 1983.

=== 2023 constitutional crisis ===
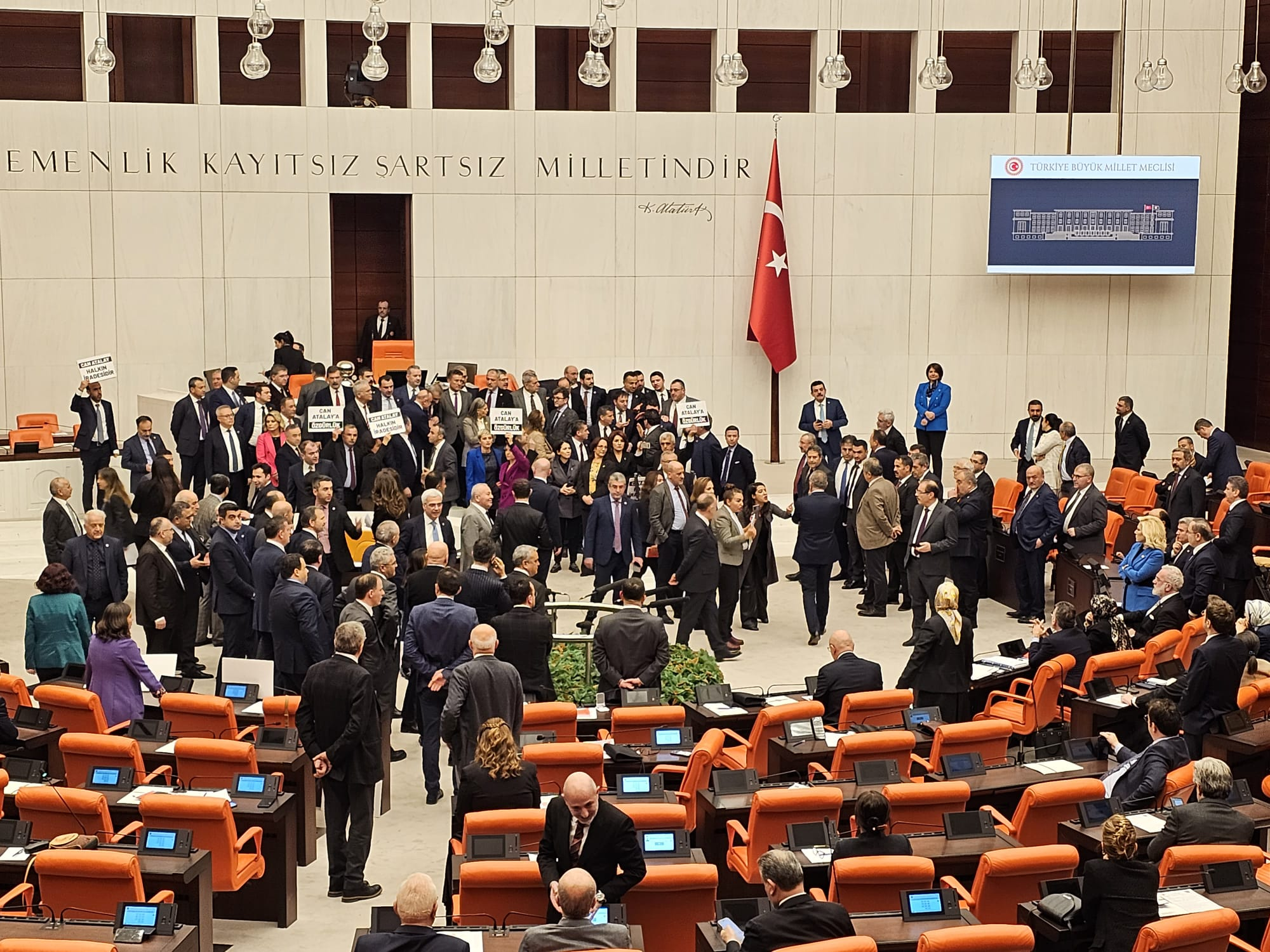
Turkish Grand National Assembly after Can Atalay decision

On 8 November 2023 a constitutional crisis unfolded in Turkey between the Court of Cassation and the Constitutional Court when the Court of Cassation intervened to overturn a ruling by the Constitutional Court regarding the release of an imprisoned member of the Turkish Parliament, Can Atalay.

The Constitutional Court had previously ordered the release of Atalay, asserting that his imprisonment infringed upon his rights to security, liberty, and the right to be elected. However the Court of Cassation annulled this decision, instructing lower courts not to abide by it. Furthermore, the appeals court called for a criminal investigation into the Constitutional Court members, alleging that their ruling constituted a violation of the constitution.

The opposition parties and the Union of Turkish Bar Associations called this action a "judicial coup attempt". Additionally, certain executives within the ruling Justice and Development Party criticised the Court of Cassation's ruling. The new leader of the main opposition Republican People's Party, Özgür Özel, called the ruling "a coup attempt against the constitutional order." He further emphasized the significance of the situation, stating, "I called our parliamentary group to an extraordinary closed meeting on the latest developments in the judiciary. The developments cannot be underestimated or ignored. Beyond the crime of violating the Constitution, this is an attempt to oppose the constitutional order. It should be suppressed immediately."

== Administration ==
The Court is divided into 30 chambers according to their particular specialized field. It comprises 20 civil chambers and 10 penal chambers. Until 2001, there were 21 civil and 11 criminal chambers. A chamber has five members, one of which is president of the chamber. Judgments are taken by majority. One judge elected by all of the judges of the Court of Cassation presides over the entire Court as general President. All presidents and judge-members from the civil chambers form the General Civil Assembly, and all presidents and judge-members of the criminal chambers constitute the General Criminal Assembly (Yargıtay Ceza Genel Kurulu). The General Assemblies decide on cases, if the lower court does not comply with the chamber's decision, persisting in its own decision and on cases that the Chief Prosecutor at the Court of Cassation has appealed. There are 250 high judges, 32 heads of chamber and 440 Rapporteur-Judges whose duty is to carry out preliminary preparation and to explain case-file to the judge-members of this Court and 144 prosecutors working at the Court of Cassation. In the civil chambers, the average case-file number which comes to these chambers annually is 261,716, and the duration of handling case-file changes from two to three months. In the criminal chambers, 139,025 annual case-files are concluded on the average.

The High Court of Appeals is administered by the following judges (as of June 2024):

- Ömer Kerkez, First President
- Muhsin Şentürk, Chief Public Prosecutor
- Eyüp Yeşil, Deputy First President
- Adem Albayrak, Deputy First President
- Rıdvan Gündoğdu, Deputy Chief Public Prosecutor
- Aydın Şimşek, Secretary General

== Reforms ==
As recorded in the European Commission 2005 report: “The Law Establishing the Intermediate Courts of Appeal came into force on 1 June 2005. The establishment of the Courts of Appeal will substantially reduce the case load of the Court of Cassation and enable it to concentrate on its function of providing guidance to lower courts on points of law of general public importance. The Law provides that the Courts are to be established within two years of its entry into force.” The progress report of the European Commission on Turkey dated 9 November 2010 stated: "The regional courts of appeal are not operational yet. By law, they should have been in operation by June 2007."

In the country report 2009, Human Rights Watch wrote: "Decisions of Turkey’s Court of Cassation continued to flout international human rights law and the case law of the European Court of Human Rights, and demonstrate that the judiciary remains a site of institutionalized resistance to reform." The organization criticized a March 2008 precedent decision by the General Penal Board of the Court of Cassation, ruling that individuals joining demonstrations where the Kurdistan Workers' Party (PKK) had called for public participation were to be charged with “membership” in the PKK for “committing a crime in the name of the organization.” In a report of 17 June 2010, Amnesty International called for an end of prosecution of children under anti-terrorism legislation. The organization stated, "Thousands of children in Turkey, some as young as 12, have been prosecuted under anti-terrorism legislation, solely for their alleged participation in demonstrations considered by the government to be in support of terrorism. Prosecutions are often based on insubstantive evidence or statements taken from the children under pressure. The anti-terrorism legislation that the children are prosecuted under is vague and overly broad in its wording and unfair in its application by judges and prosecutors." On 19 November 2010, Amnesty International referred to legal changes regarding trials of minors: "The Turkish government amended the law to prevent the prosecution of child demonstrators under anti-terrorism legislation solely for their alleged participation in demonstrations. Under these amendments, all children previously convicted under the Anti-Terror Law will have their convictions quashed and all children prosecuted under other laws will be tried in Children’s Courts rather than adult Special Heavy Penal Courts."

These and other criticisms led to further reforms. On 1 March 2011, the Law Library of Congress reported: "Turkey's Parliament passed a controversial judicial reform bill on February 9, 2011. Under the Law on the Amendment of Certain Laws, the highest level of the judiciary will be restructured. The Court of Appeals (Court of Cassation, Yargıtay, the highest court for civil and criminal cases) will have the number of its chambers increased to 38 from 32, and the Council of State (or Supreme Administrative Court, Danıştay, the country's highest administrative court) will have 15 divisions instead of the current 13.

In signing the bill into law on 14 February 2011, Turkish President Abdullah Gül remarked that had he not approved it, "200,000 cases could have faced the statute of limitations."

== See also ==
- Crime in Turkey
- Judicial system of Turkey
