= Festival bans in Turkey =

The festival bans, which started with the cancellation of Anadolu Fest, affected the society as more and more similar events banned by governors and district governors.

On May 9, 2022, Governor of Eskişehir announced that all events, including concerts, festivals and celebrations, between 10 and 24 May 2022 were banned. Ban of the Anadolu Fest event, which was held between these dates, created reactions in the society. The rationale for the ban was stated as "to ensure a peaceful environment, public order and public security, to prevent crime, to protect the rights and freedoms of others, and to prevent the spread of violent incidents." On May 25, 2022, Melek Mosso's future concert at the "Isparta Gül Festivali" was canceled by the governor, due to pressure from conservative associations. Then, on August 10, 2022, the Burhaniye governorate banned the Zeytinli Rock Festival. The bans were criticized by opposition parties, artists, and the public for being "the result of political decisions."

== Background ==
External videos
- Türkiye'de festivallerin iptal edilmesinin arkasında ne yatıyor?

The measures of pandemic COVID -19 included a nighttime ban on music broadcasts in Turkey. The ban on music was maintained even after the pandemic ended and met with resistance from artists, politicians, business owners, and the public. In 2022, after a series of event cancellations, it was suspected that political reasons, influenced by political Islam, were behind these bans and cancellations. The Governor of Eskişehir banned mass events for 15 days and the Anadolu Fest was canceled, while the ESTU Cultural Fest organized by the Eskişehir Technical University was not banned. The Muedafaa-i İslam movement (Müdafaa-i İslam Hareketi), which had previously filed a complaint calling for LGBTI+ events to be stopped by shaping public opinion, shared the decisions to ban music festivals on its social media accounts as a success. Journalist Erdal Atabek said the reason for the bans was that the Justice and Development Party wanted to win the support of sects and communities. According to a BBC News Turkish report, the reason given for some of the canceled concerts was that "local authorities do not approve of the artist's profile."

== Reactions ==
Party leaders, artists and professional associations reacted to the bans. After the cancellation of Greek violinist Apolas Lermi's concert in Trabzon, Turkey Musical Works Owners Professional Union (MESAM) President Recep Erguel criticized the situation: "These bans are unacceptable." After the ban on the Zeytinli Rock Festival, Güneş Duru, guitarist of the band Redd, stated that the reason for the ban was "ideological and interferes with the way of life." After the MilyonFest Fethiye festival was canceled by Governor of Muğla, Republican People's Party chairman Kemal Kılıçdaroğlu criticized the bans in a tweet. Aylin Aslım, one of the artists who will participate in the MilyonFest event, called this decision "shameful." Fethiye Mayor Alim Karaca responded to the governorate's MilyonFest decision by saying, "The concerts of people close to them will not be canceled." According to the Republican People's Party's Eskişehir MP Utku Çakırözer, there was no concrete justification for the decisions that led to the bans. Organizers also reacted to the bans on the canceled concerts and festivals.

== Aftermath ==
In response to Republican People's Party chairman Kemal Kılıçdaroğlu's criticism of the festival bans, Turkish Interior Minister Süleyman Soylu tweeted, "The state will not allow an organization that wants to organize a series of frauds illegally under the name of festival." Following the public outcry after the banned events, one person known to be close to the Mudafaa-i Islam movement tweeted to rally support for the cancellation of the Fanta Youth Festival. Mehmet Nuri Ersoy, Turkey's Minister of Culture and Tourism, stated on the NTV television program "Seda Öğretir ile Özel Röportaj" that "the fewer restrictions, limitations and cancelations, the better for us" and suggested that organizers of canceled events should turn to the judiciary.

== Banned events ==
| # | Event | City | Authority announcing the decision | Cite |
|---|---|---|---|---|
| 1 | Anadolu Fest | Eskişehir | Governor of Eskişehir | |
| 2 | Niyazi Koyuncu concert | İstanbul | Pendik Municipality | |
| 3 | Apolas Lermi concert | Denizli | Pamukkale Municipality | |
| 4 | Ara Malikian concert | Ankara | Ministry of Culture and Tourism | |
| 5 | Munzur Kültür ve Doğa Festivali | Tunceli | Governor of Turnceli | |
| 6 | Kozlu Müzik Festivali | Zonguldak | Governor of Zonguldak | |
| 7 | Kazdağı Ekoloji Festivali | Balıkesir | Governor of Balıkesir | |
| 8 | Mirae concert | Ankara | Ministry of Culture and Tourism | |
| 9 | METU International Spring Fest | Ankara | METU Rectorate | |
| 10 | Aynur Doğan concerts | Kocaeli | Derince Municipality | |
| 11 | Zeytinli Rock Festivali | Balıkesir | Burhaniye District Governorship | |
| 12 | Metin & Kemal Kahraman concert | Muş | Governor of Muş | |
| 13 | MilyonFest | Muğla | Governor of Eskişehir | |
| 14 | Çağdaş Fest | Muğla | Fethiye District Governorship | |
| 15 | Mohsen Namjoo | Various cities | Various governmental institutions | |
