= Armenian Evangelical Church, Elâzığ =

Church building in Turkey

Coordinates: 38.6772°N 39.2244°E

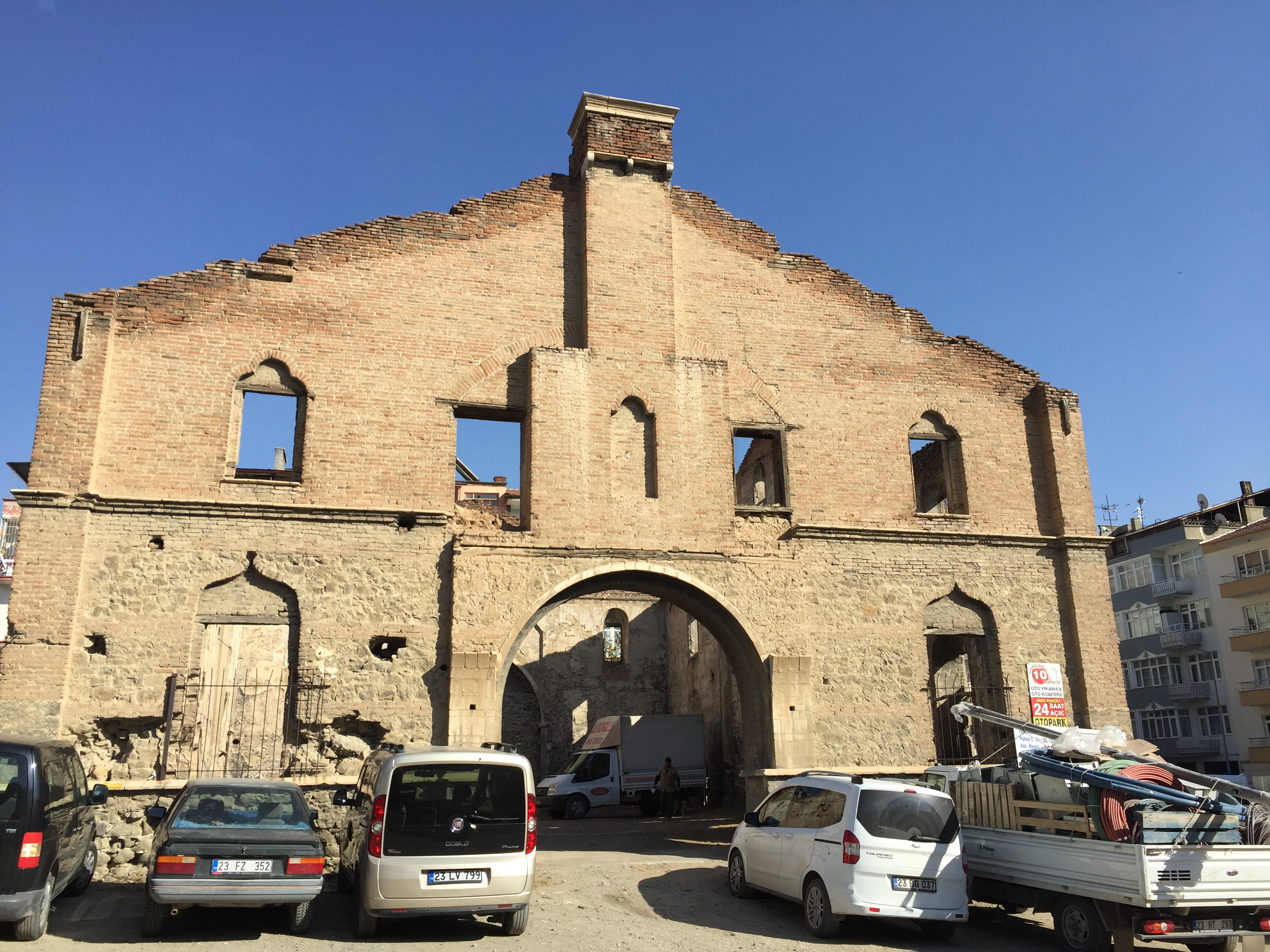
- The front facade of the church

- Location: Elâzığ, Elâzığ Province
- Country: Turkey
- Denomination: Armenian Evangelical

History
- Status: Church

Architecture
- Functional status: Abandoned

The historical Armenian Evangelical Church (Turkish: Ermeni Protestan Kilisesi, Armenian: Հայաստանեայց Աւետարանական Եկեղեցի) is an Armenian Evangelical church located in the centre of the Turkish town of Elazığ (Mamuretül-Aziz), next to Kharpert. After being abandoned due to the Armenian genocide, it has been used as a public toilet.

It was built in the 19th century and constituted the headquarters of this church for Elazığ. After the Armenian Genocide which began in 1915, the church was used as the Arpaci Powder Industry Fabrique, then as a playground for children, and marketplace and shelter for animals. Despite its Armenian identity it was described as a "historical Assyrian church" by the Turkish authorities in 1973. In 2007, the Turkish state announced it will turn the church into a hospital, but as of 2014 no change has been made. Because of its location in the centre of Elazığ, it is used as parking lot for cars.

Interior frescoes of Jesus and Mary are heavily damaged but can still be seen. The entrance is damaged and there is no roof left.

== Sources ==
- "Kiliseyi tuvalet yaptılar" (in Turkish). 29 March 2014. (in Turkish)
