= Elazığ Province =

Province of Turkey

Coordinates: 38°40′03″N 39°21′35″E

Elazığ Province Elazığ ili
- Province
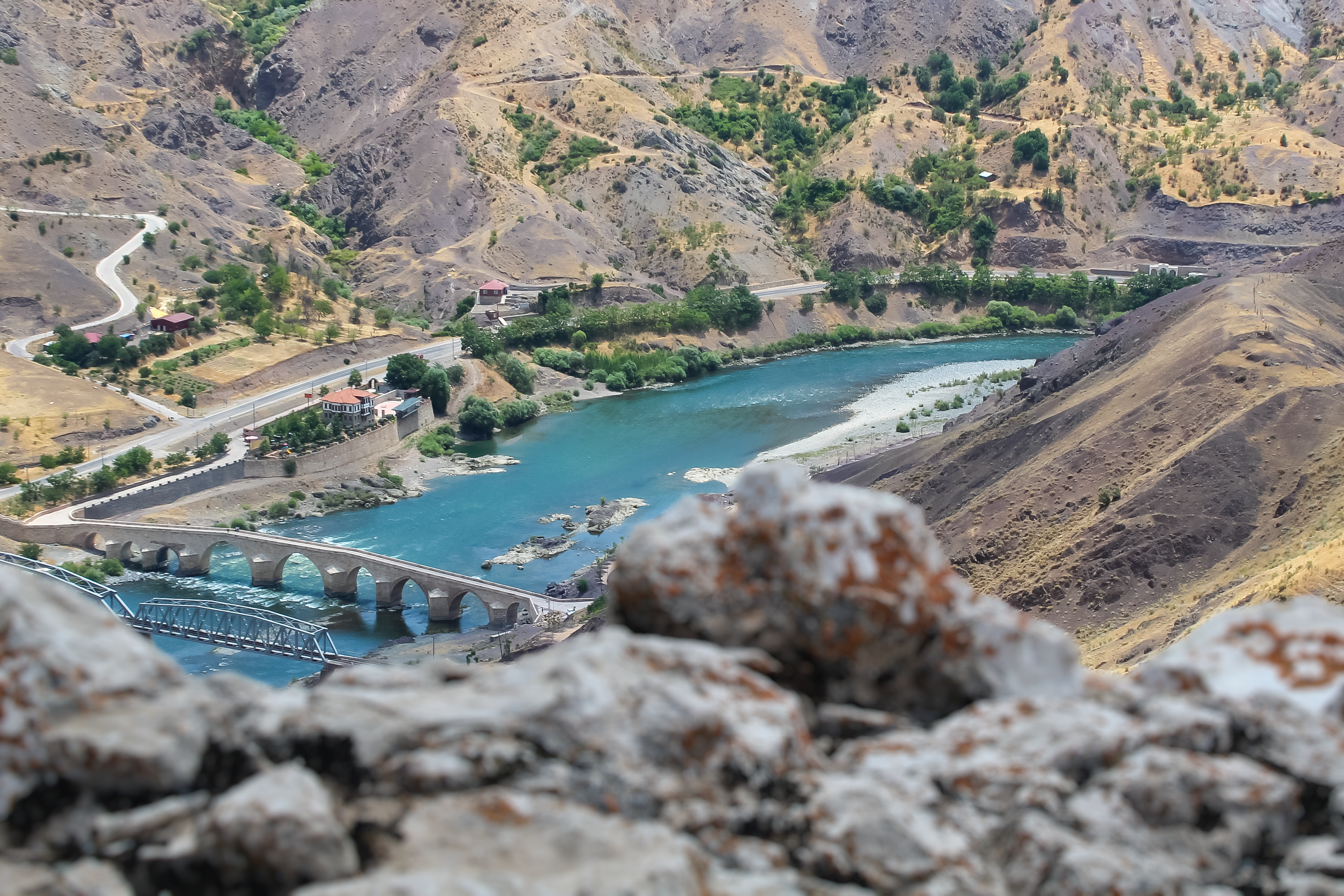
- Murat River, which connects to the Keban Dam.

- Location of the province within Turkey
- Country: Turkey
- Seat: Elazığ

Government
  - Governor: Numan Hatipoğlu
- Area: 9,383 km^{2} (3,623 sq mi)
- Population (2022): 591,497
  - Density: 63.04/km^{2} (163.3/sq mi)
- Time zone: UTC+3 (TRT)
- Area code: 0424
- Website: www.elazig.gov.tr

Elazığ Province (Turkish: Elazığ ili; Zazaki: Suke Xarpêt; Kurdish: Parêzgeha Xarpêtê) is a province of Turkey with its seat in the city of Elazığ. Its area is 9,383 km^{2}, and its population is 591,497 (2022). The population of the province was 569,616 in 2000 and 498,225 in 1990. The province is considered part of Turkish Kurdistan and has a Kurdish majority.

== History ==
In 1927 the office of the Inspector General was created, which governed with martial law. The province was included in the first Inspectorate General (Umumi Müfettişlik, UM) over which the Inspector General ruled. The UM spanned over the provinces of Hakkâri, Siirt, Van, Mardin, Bitlis, Şanlıurfa, Elazığ and Diyarbakır.

In December 1935, the Tunceli Law was passed, which demanded a more powerful Government in the region. In January 1936 the Elazığ Province was transferred under the authority of the newly established Fourth Inspectorate General, which span over the provinces of Elazığ, Erzincan, Bingöl and Tunceli and its seat was in the city of Elazığ. The fourth UM was governed by a Governor-Commander. Most of the employees in the municipalities had to be from the military and the Governor-Commander had the authority to evacuate whole villages and resettle them in another part of the province. In 1946 the Tunceli Law was abolished and the state of emergency removed but the authority of the fourth UM was transferred to the military.

The Inspectorates General were dissolved in 1952 during the Government of the Democrat Party.

The province has experienced many earthquakes, including a magnitude 6.1 earthquake on 8 March 2010 and a magnitude 6.7 earthquake on 24 January 2020.

== Geography ==
Elazığ stretches in a general west-southwest to east-northeast direction, along the line of equal geographic latitude and longitude. The source of the Euphrates river is located in this province. 826 km^{2} (319 sq mi) of its area is covered by reservoirs and natural lakes.

== Districts ==
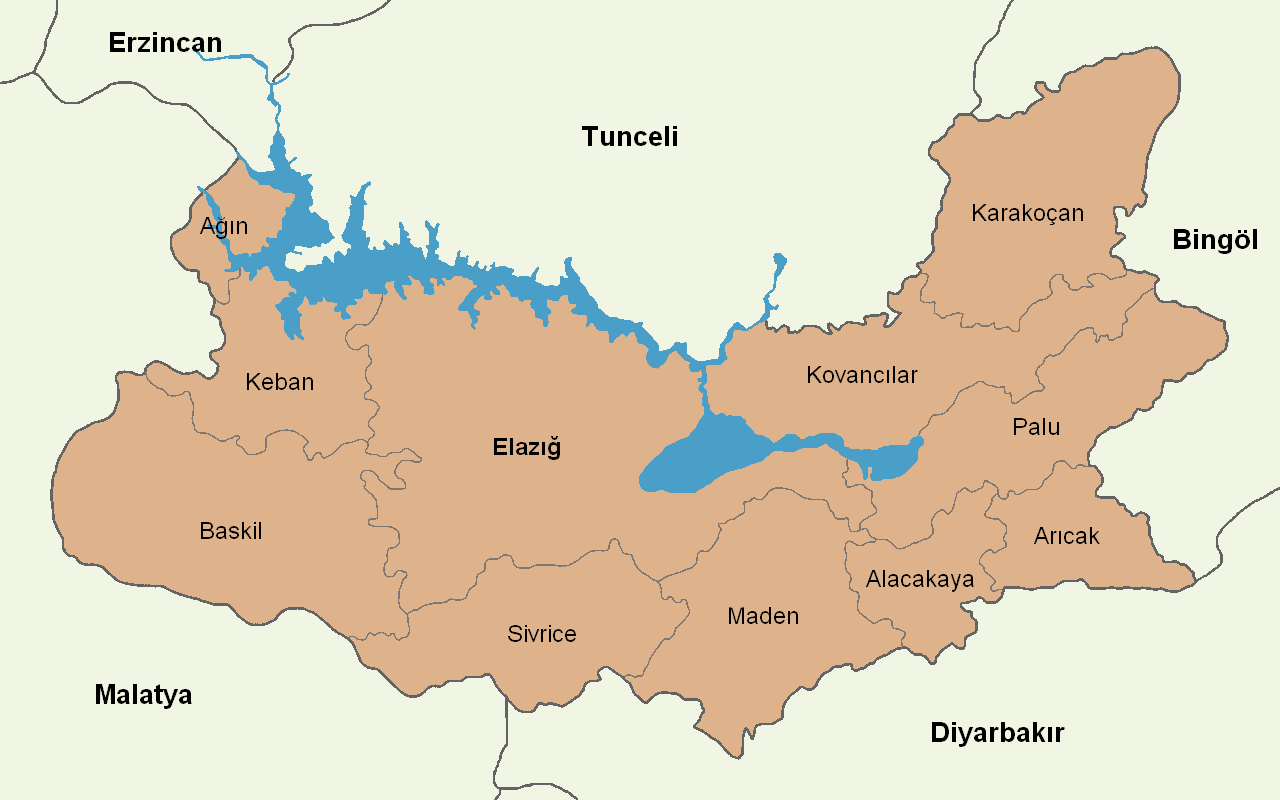
Elazığ districts

Elazığ province is divided into 11 districts (capital district in bold):

- Ağın
- Alacakaya
- Arıcak
- Baskil
- **Elazığ**
- Karakoçan
- Keban
- Kovancılar
- Maden
- Palu
- Sivrice

== Economy ==
Historically, Elazığ Province produced silver, which ceased being mined in 1885. The Turkish government attempted to modernize the mines; however, the cost of fuel and energy caused the shut down. There was a silver mine still producing in 1903 in Palu, as with coal. Coal is also found in other areas of the province. Gold and salt was also produced.

== Education ==
Education is provided by the Elazığ Provincial Directorate for National Education. It currently views over 442 educational institutions, both formal and informal ones.

== Archaeology ==
Altınova, Elazığ was an important archaeological site in the Altınova plain that was excavated in the 1970s. It was later flooded by the Keban Dam. Other sites in the Altınova plain were also Tepecik, Korucutepe, Değirmentepe, and Körtepe.

== Gallery ==
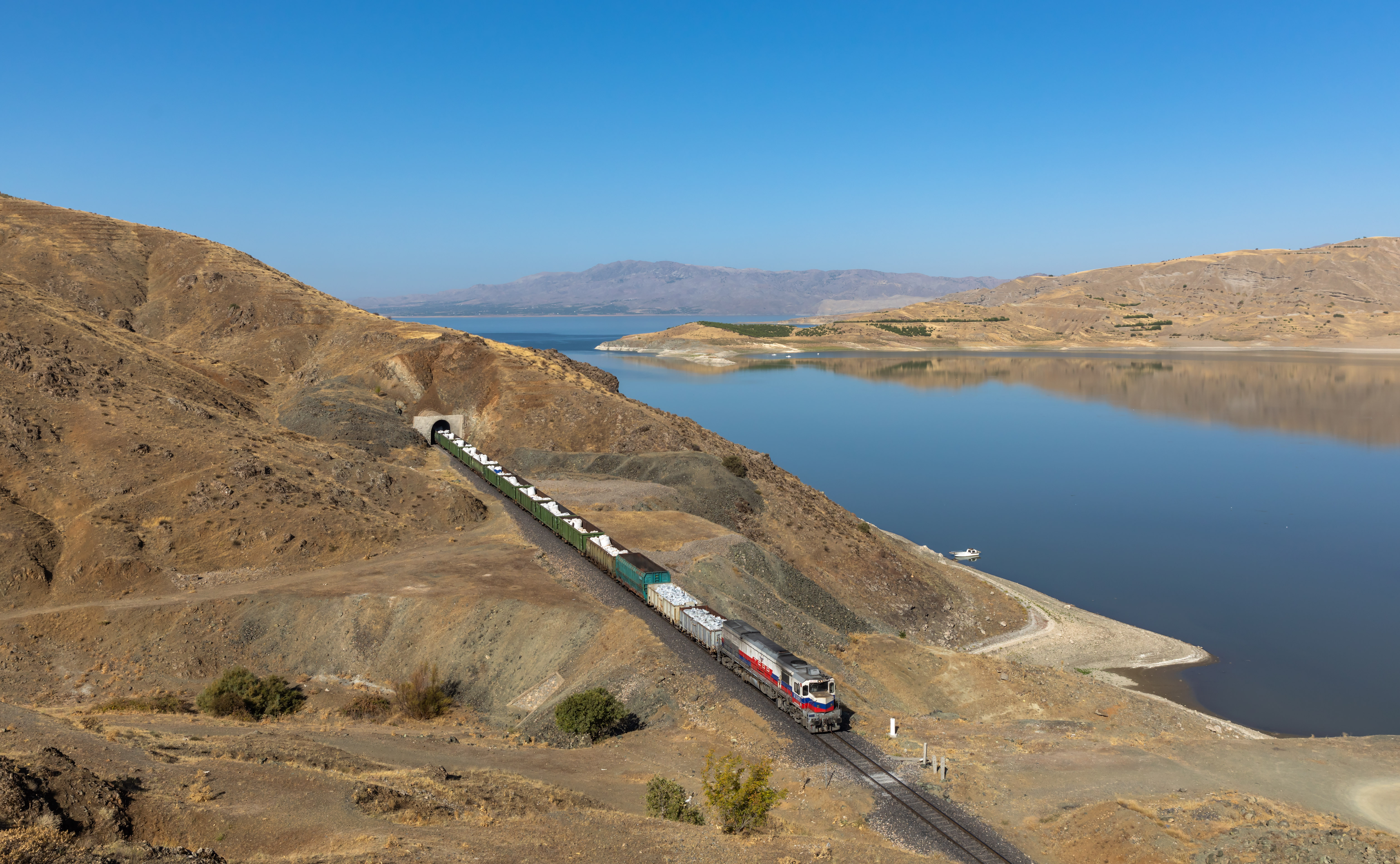
TCDD DE 33 075 Konak - Murat.

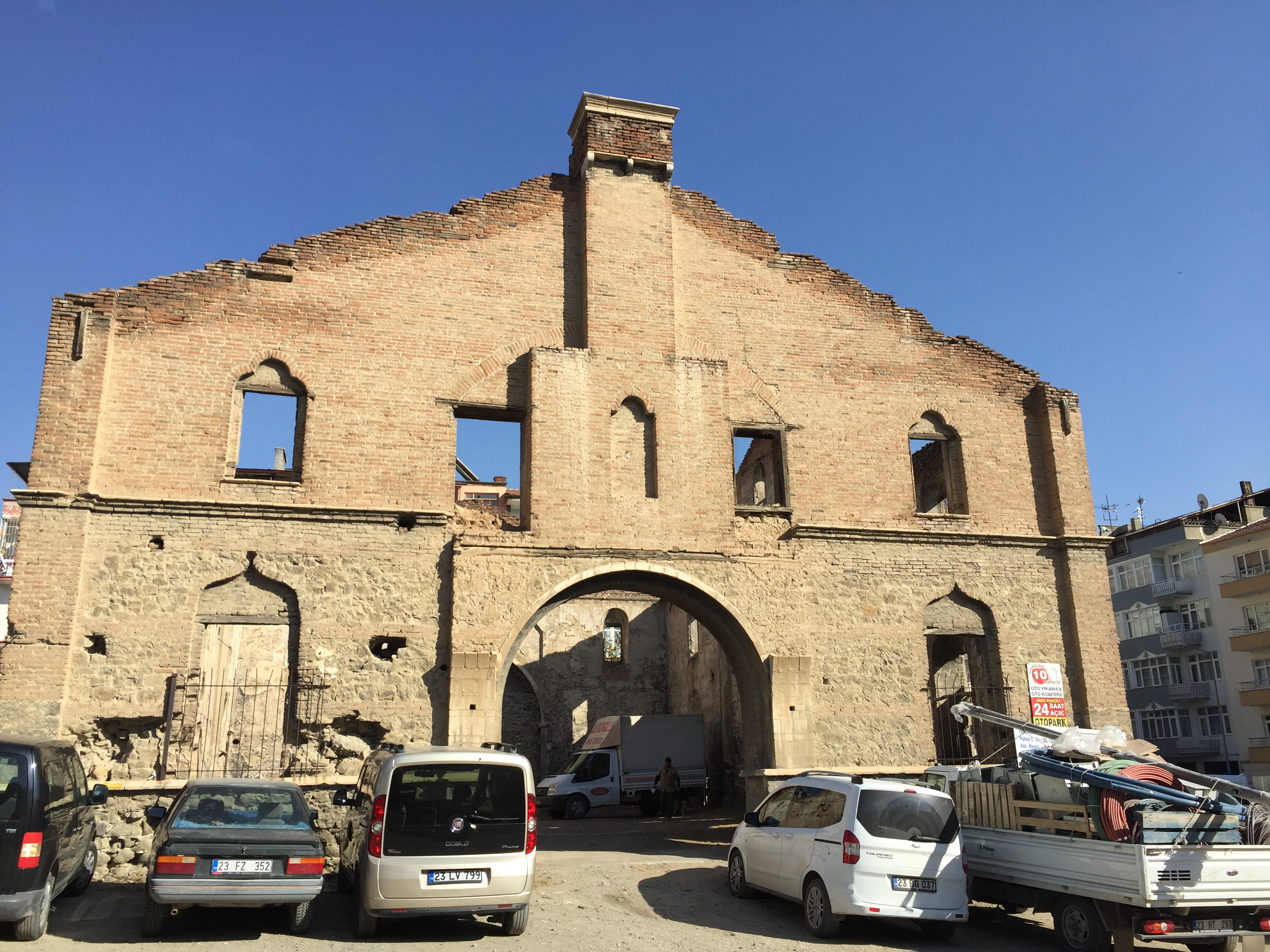
Armenian Evangelical Church, Elazığ

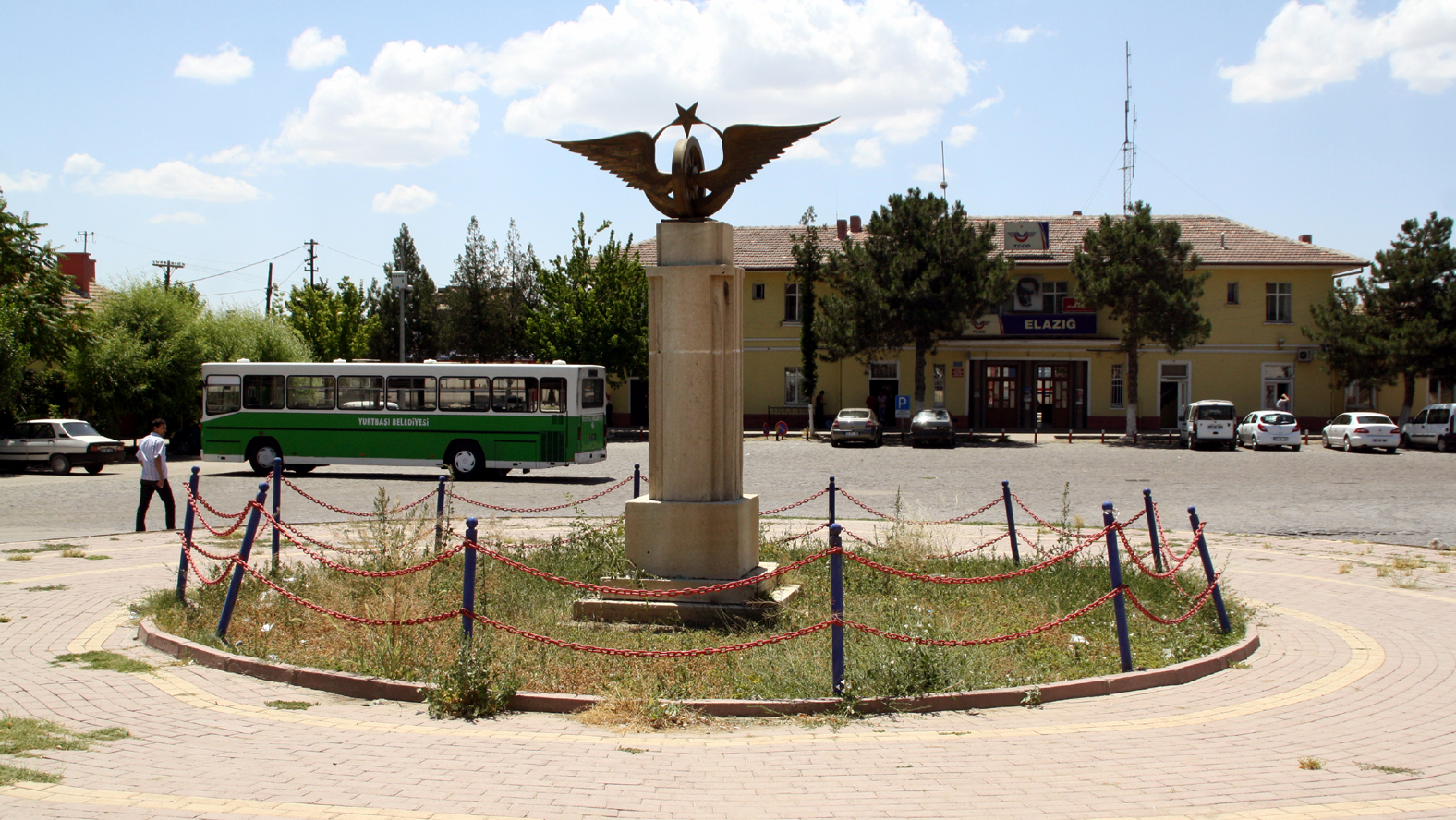
Elazığ Train Station

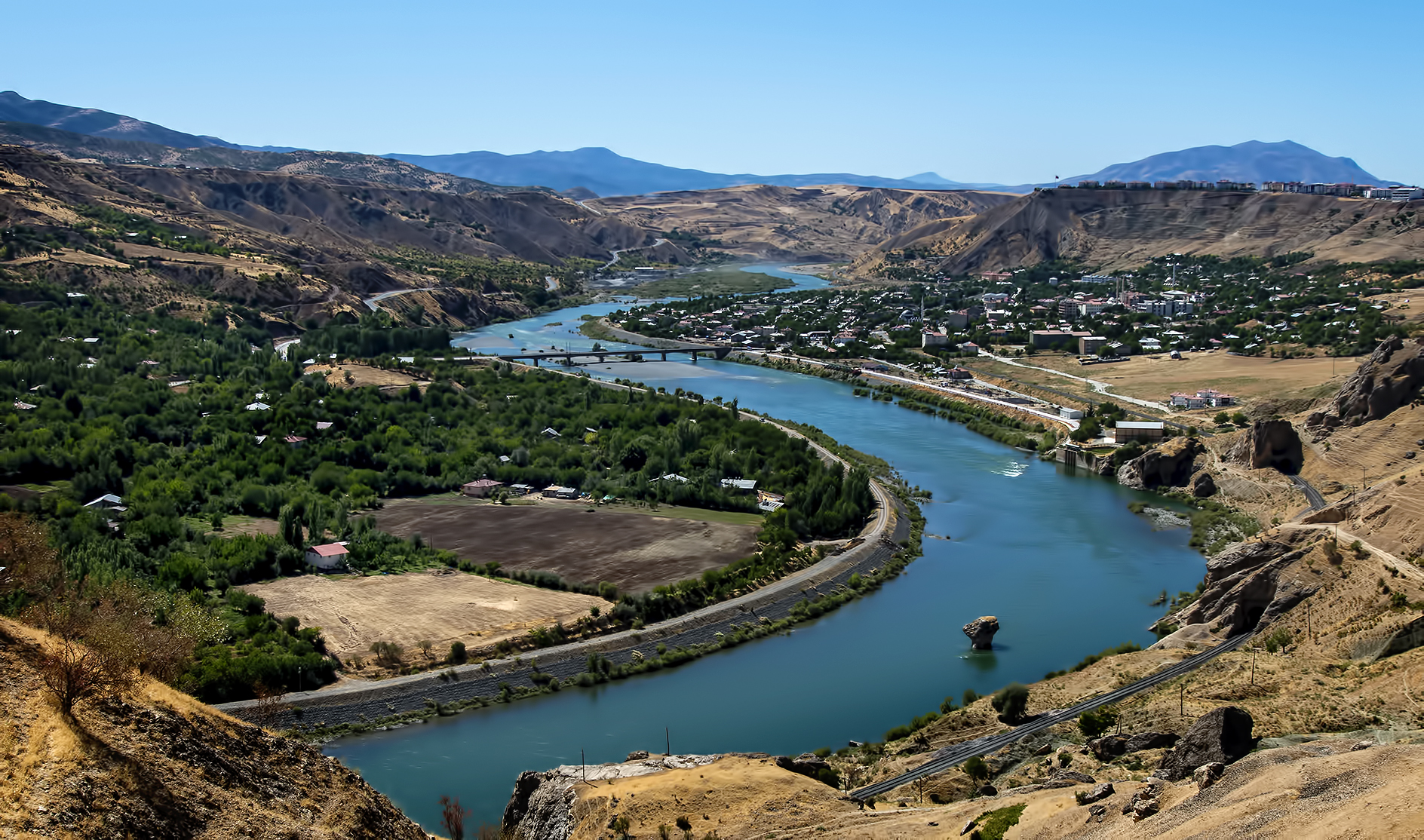
Palu and the Murat river

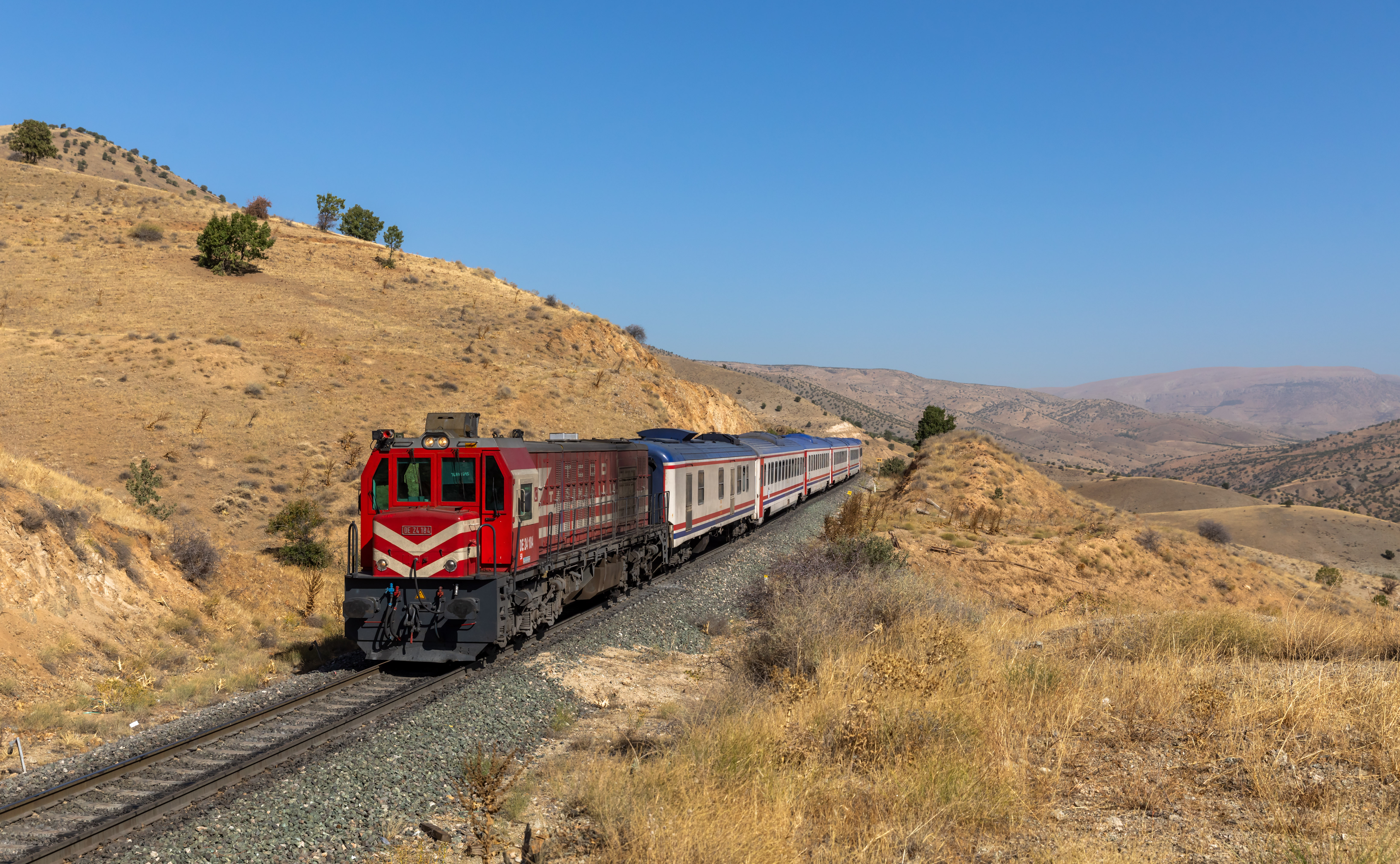
DE 24 184 of TCDD (Türkiye Cumhuriyeti Devlet Demiryollari) at Pınarlı, Turkey.

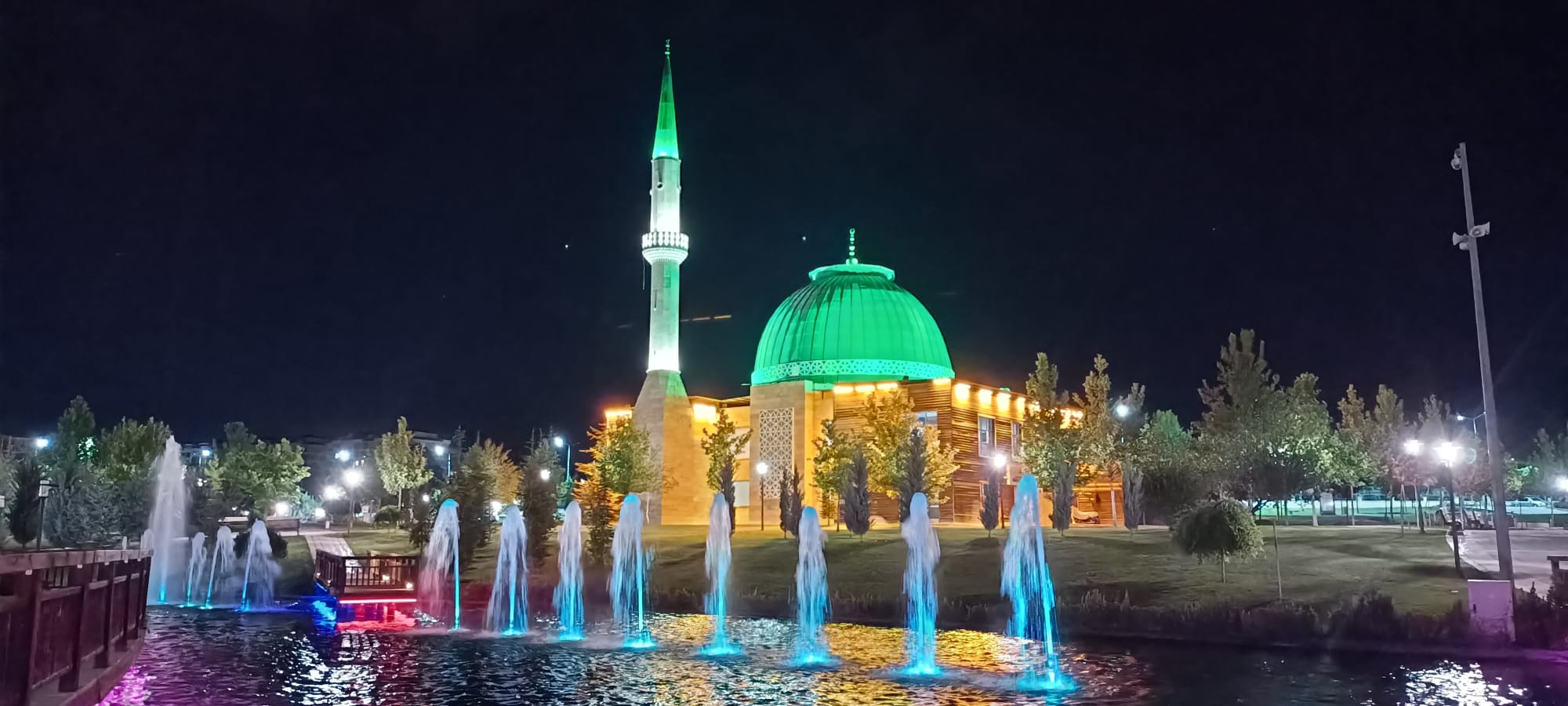
Culture Park

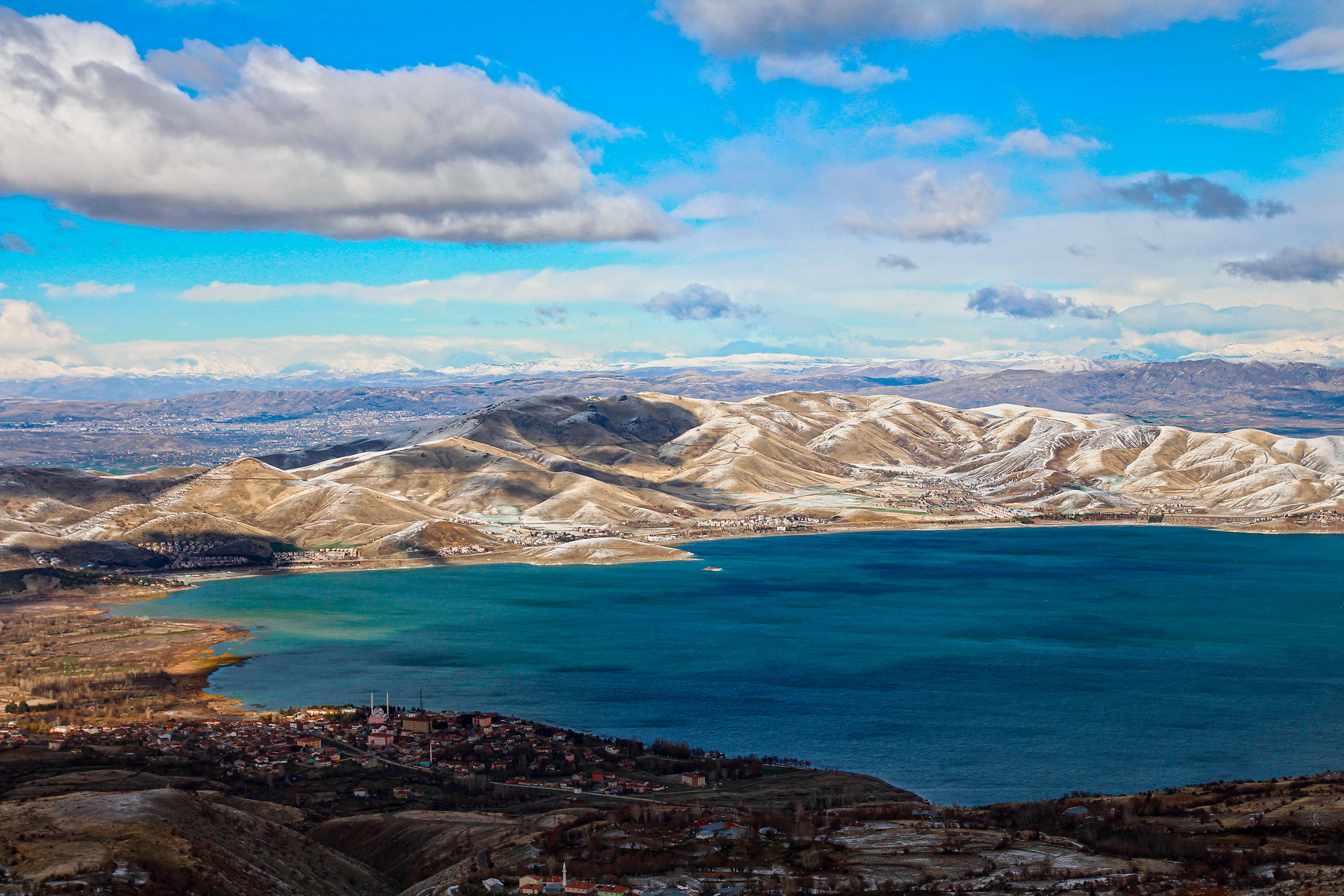
Lake Hazar

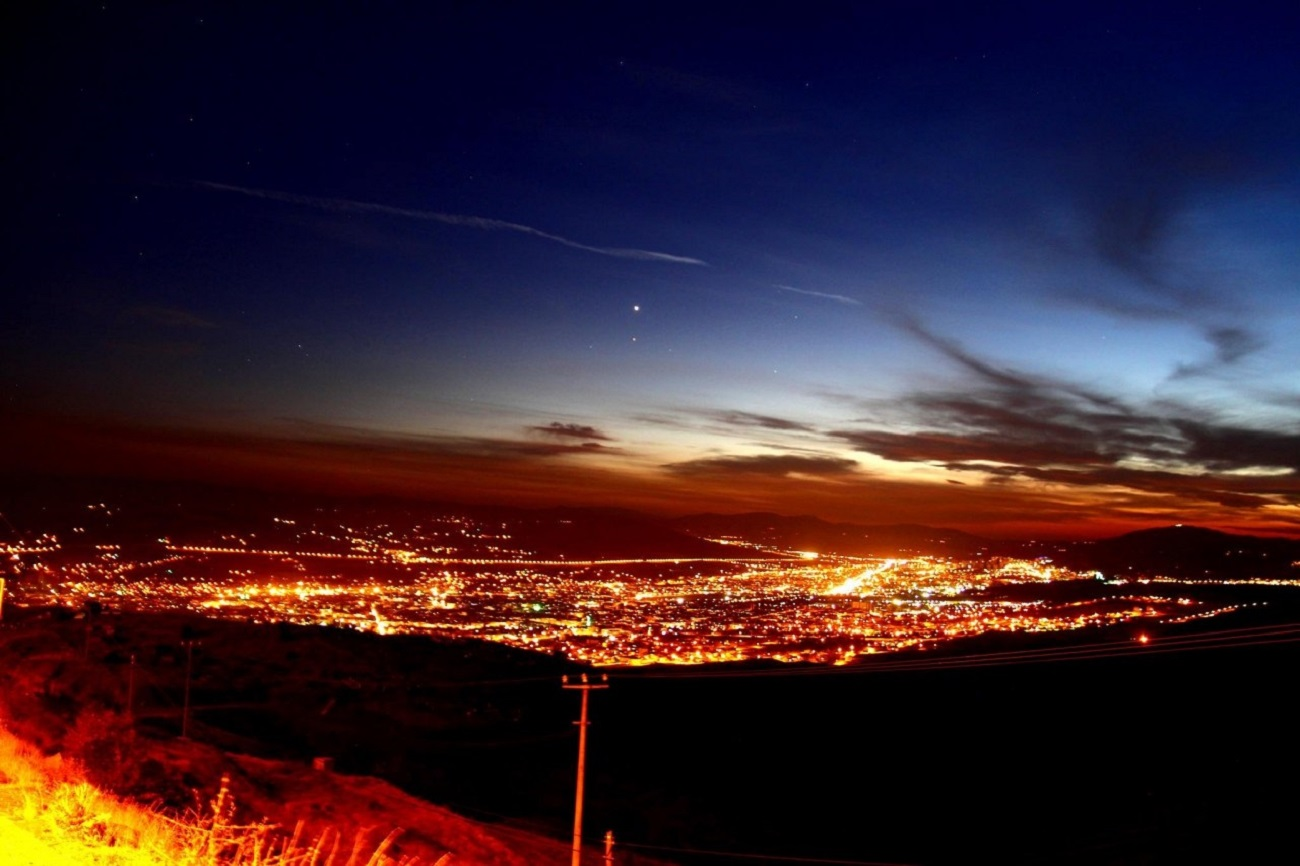
City view at night

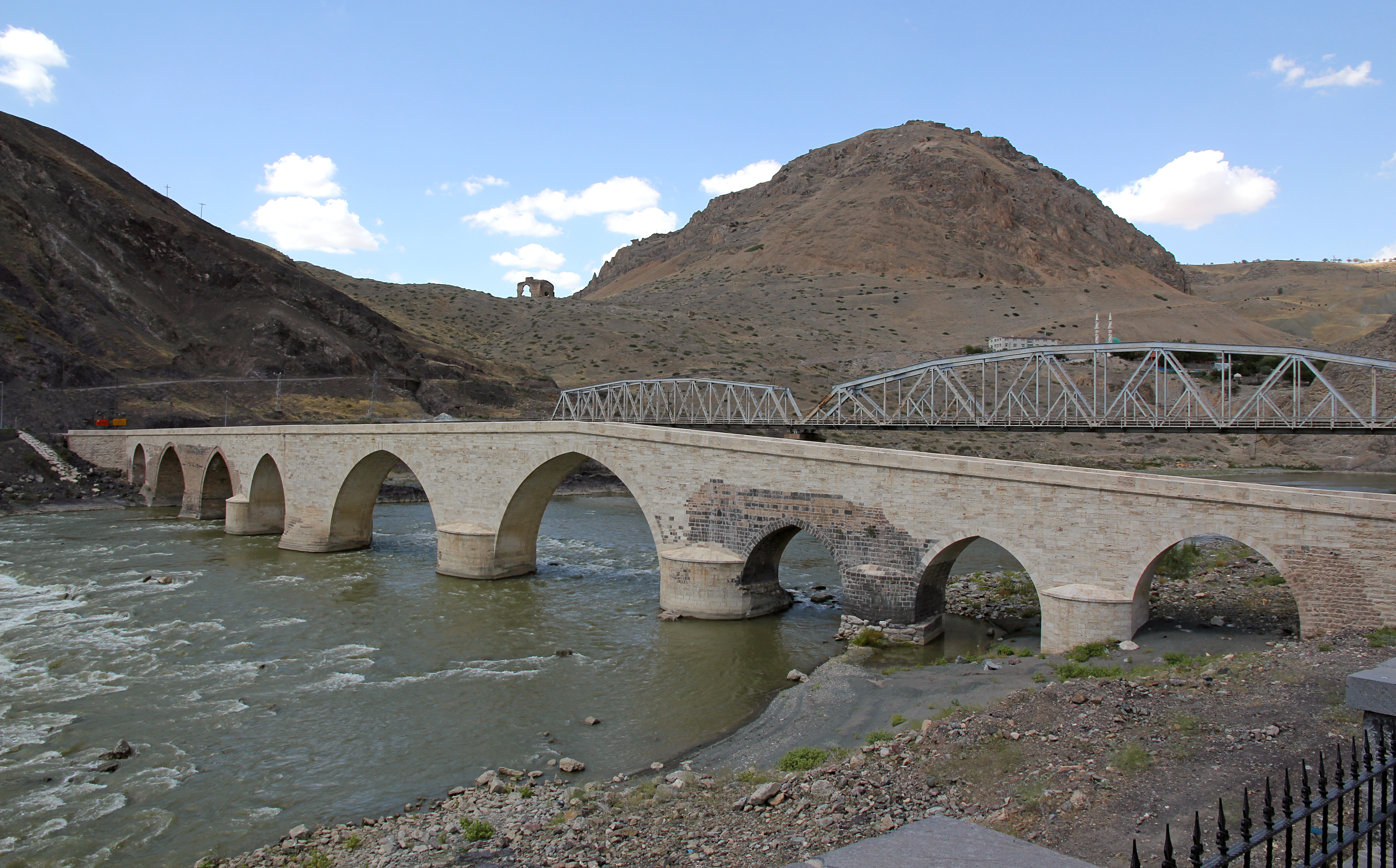
Stone Bridge, Palu

== See also ==
- List of populated places in Elazığ Province
