= İnönü University =

Public university in Malatya, Turkey

Coordinates: 38.3331°N 38.4389°E

- Type: Public
- Established: 1975
- Rector: Prof. Dr. Nusret Akpolat
- Academic staff: 1,866
- Total staff: 6518
- Students: 36.790
- Location: Malatya, Turkey
- Campus: Urban and Suburban (Total 7.68 km2)
- Language: Turkish and English
- Colors: White, Orange and Black
- Website: www.inonu.edu.tr

University rankings

Regional – Overall
- QS Emerging Europe and Central Asia: 301-350 (2022)

İnönü University is a public university in Malatya, Turkey. On 28 January 1975, the Grand National Assembly of Turkey ordered the establishment of İnönü University in Malatya, the hometown of the second president of Turkey, İsmet İnönü.

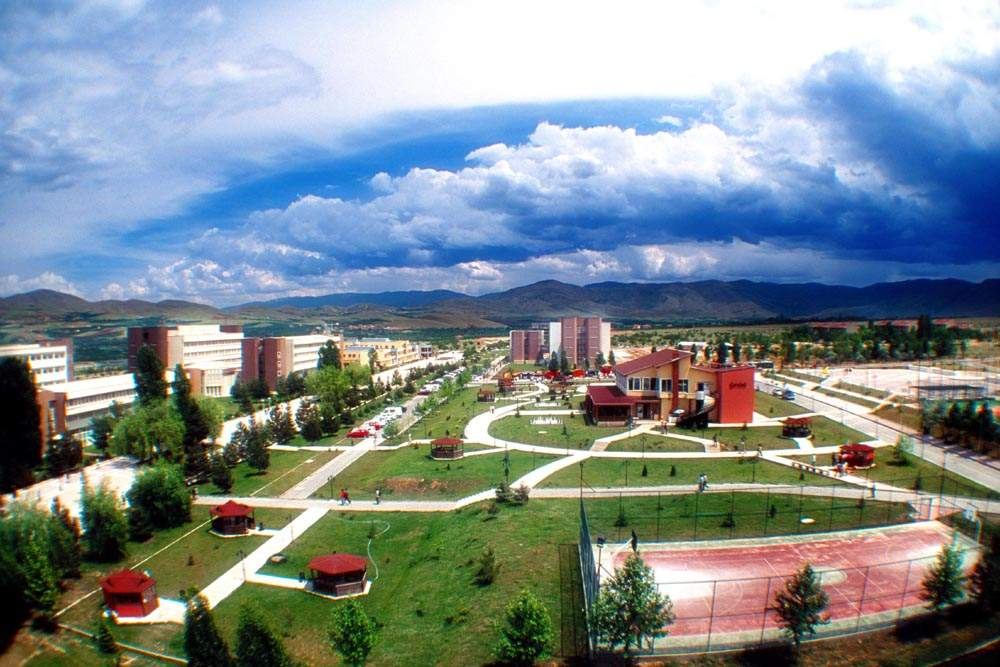
İnönü University Main Campus

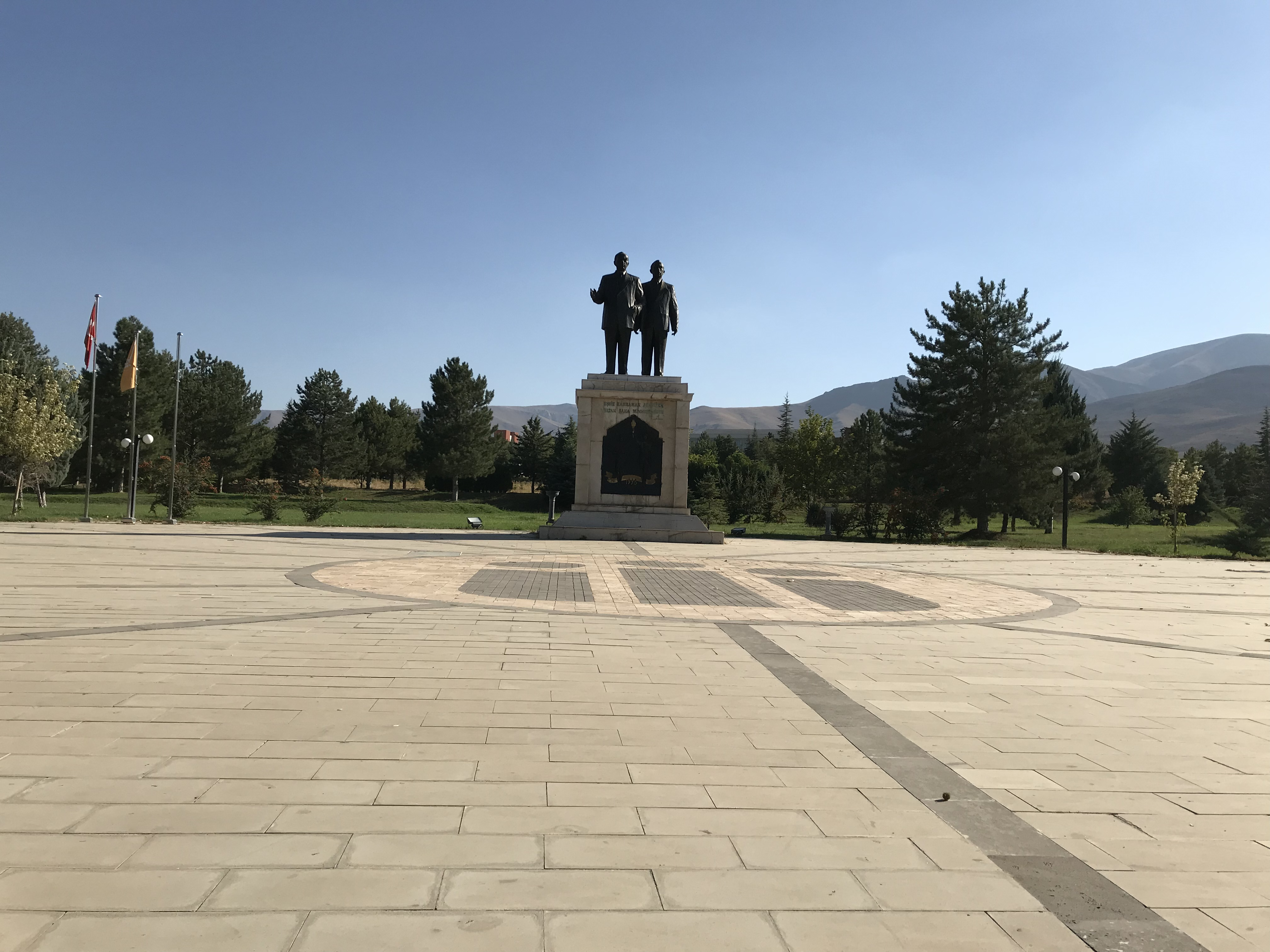
İnönü statue in Main Campus

İnönü University is one of the biggest public university of eastern part of Turkey. İnönü University has 6 institutes, 14 faculties, 2 colleges including 1 state conservatory, 31 research centers, 1 Technopolis(Malatya Technology Development Zone) and 1 research and training hospital. By the year 2021, 136,641 students had graduated from İnönü University since 1975. Inside the university, there is a museum commemorating İsmet İnönü, along with another museum commemorating Turgut Özal. Currently, İnönü University has over 1600 faculty members and research assistants, around 3500 graduate students and over 41000 (approximately 1500 students from different countries) undergraduate students.

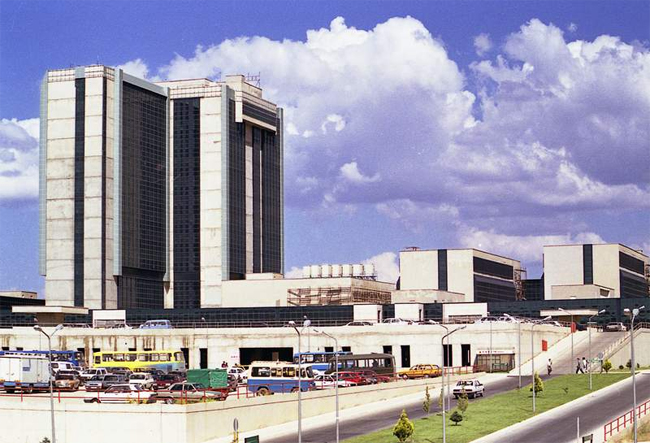
Turgut Ozal Medical Center, İnönü University Main Campus

İnönü University Turgut Özal Medical Center is one of the biggest research and training hospital in the world. It is a 1,352-bed hospital with 38 operating rooms. Serving as a district hospital, it accepts patients from neighboring countries as well. It ranks among the top three hospitals worldwide for liver transplants and also specializes in other areas such as kidney transplants, bone marrow transplants, and burn injuries.

In addition, İnönü University has the largest Solar Energy Center in Turkey. With this energy center, İnönü University produces its own electricity for Turgut Özal Medical Center. The center was built with the university's own endowment. The Solar Energy Center fulfills 30 percent of Turgut Özal Medical Center's electricity requirement. İnönü University Solar Energy Center started to work in May 2015.

== Academic Units ==
=== Institutes ===
- Institute of Alevism Studies
- Institute of Education Sciences
- Graduate School of Natural and Applied Sciences
- Liver Transplantation Institute
- Health Sciences Institute
- Social Sciences Institute

=== Faculties ===
- Faculty of Dentistry
- Faculty of Pharmacy
- Faculty of Education
- Faculty of Arts and Sciences
- Faculty of Fine Art and Design
- Faculty of Nursing
- Faculty of Law
- Faculty of Economics and Administrative Sciences
- Faculty of Theology
- Faculty of Communication
- Faculty of Engineering
- Faculty of Health Sciences
- Faculty of Sports Sciences
- Medical Faculty

=== Conservatory ===
- State Conservatory

=== Schools ===
- School of Foreign Languages

=== Vocational Schools ===
- Vocational School of Justice
- Malatya Vocational School
- Malatya Organised Industrial Zone Vocational School
- Vocational School of Health Services

=== Research and Application Centers ===
- African Studies Research and Application Center
- Arguvan Music Culture Research and Application Center
- Beekeeping Development Research and Application Center
- Arslantepe Archaeology Studies Research and Application Center
- Atatürk's Principles and History of Revolution Research and Application Center
- Eurasia Alevism-Bektashism Research and Application Center
- Scientific and Technological Research Center
- Biotechnology Research and Application Center
- Environmental Issues Research and Application Center
- Children with Disabilities Research and Application Center
- Traditional Crafts Research and Application Center
- Traditional Folk Medicines Research and Application Center
- Astronomy Research and Application Center
- South Asian Studies Research and Application Center
- Pharmaceutical Research and Application Center
- Human Rights Research and Application Center
- Statistics and Econometrics Research and Application Center
- Women, Family and Community Studies Research and Application Center
- Catalysis Research and Application Center
- Clinical Research Excellence Research and Application Center
- Culture Research and Application Center
- Accounting and Finance Research and Application Center
- Niyâzî-i Mısrî Studies Research and Application Center
- Ottoman Era Research and Application Center
- Center for Strategic Studies
- Continuing Education Research and Application Center
- Turkish Teaching Research and Application Center
- Distance Education Research and Application Center
- University Industry Cooperation Research and Application Center
- Reproductive Sciences and Advanced Bioinformatics Research and Application Center
- Gifted Research and Application Center

== Turgut Özal Medical Center ==
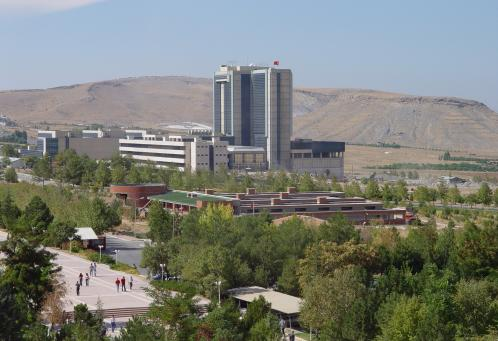
Turgut Ozal Medical Center

İnönü University Medical Faculty Research Hospital started its services in 1990, temporarily in the barracks of the State Hospital. The groundbreaking of one of the most important and most modern medical center projects of the country; Turgut Özal Medical Center was laid in 1991 and the center was completed in five years, and started its services in 1996. İnönü University Turgut Özal Medical Center is in the campus of the İnönü University, which is founded on 7.000 decades, on Highway 309, 10 kilometers east of Malatya. The total area of Turgut Özal Medical Center is 124.000 square meters. The exterior of the center has heat insulated and high reflective glass and curtain walls with barriers. There are no windows opening outside. The air-conditioning includes heating for all closed areas, hygienic air-conditioning for operating rooms and intensive-care units, cooling and ventilation operators, cooling groups and exhausters. The hospital serves with 16 floors, 1400 beds, 31 services, 20+ intensive cares and 40+ operating rooms. It serves as a district hospital and accepts patients from neighbor countries as well. It is among the top three hospitals in liver transplant in the world and also serves in other areas such as kidney transplants, bone marrow transplants and burn injuries. Most of the patient rooms are for two patients and the rooms have their own bathrooms. Every room has central oxygen and vacuum systems. There is a guesthouse for the companions of the patient who are from out of the city; and also a companion mothers' unit for the mothers of the children who are in intensive care. With the contemporary health care insight, the patient-centered hospital aims at customer satisfaction both internally and externally. In 2007, the process for Quality Management Systems had started and 2009 the hospital received TSE EN ISO 9001:2008 Quality Management Systems certificate. In 2011, the process for Occupational Health and Safety and Environment Management Systems had started and the hospital is certified in January 2012 by TSE. This is the first time a state hospital has received these certification.

== Faculty of Engineering ==
İnönü University Faculty of Engineering established in 1987. Currently, Faculty of Engineering has eight active departments which are Chemical Engineering (1988), Food Engineering (1990), Mining Engineering (1992), Electronics and Electricity Engineering (1993), Mechanical Engineering (1999), Civil Engineering (2009), Computer Science (2009) and Biomedical Engineering (2012). In addition, university plans to accept students to Industrial Engineering (1987) and Mechatronics Engineering (2012) as soon as possible.

== Rectors of İnönü University ==
Rector	Start Date	Finish Date	Profession
Nusret Akpolat	2024	Present	Pathology
Ahmet Kizilay	2016	2024	Otorhinolaryngology
Cemil Celik	2008	2016	Biochemistry
Fatih Hilmioglu	2000	2008	Internal Medicine & Gastroenterology
Omer Sarlak	1996	2000	Orthopaedics & Traumatology
Mehmet Yucesoy	1992	1996	Internal Medicine
Behsan Onol	1992	1992	Pathology
Ali Oto	1991	1992	Internal Medicine & Cardiology
Engin Mevlut Gozukara	1986	1991	Biochemistry
Yuksel Isyar	1985	1986	Agriculture
Safa Erkun	1984	1985	Sociology
Cemal Aydin	1984	1984	Astronomy
Nihat Nirun	1982	1983	Sociology
A. Fuat Cesur	1981	1982	Physics
Sureyya Aybar	1975, (Founder Rector)	1980	Chemistry

== Notable alumni ==
- Hatice Akbaş (Olympics silver medalist, world and European champion female boxer competing in the bantamweight (54 kg) division)
- Yasin Kartoğlu (Mayor of Başakşehir (District of Istanbul))
- Zeynep Kınacı
- Ali Özen
- Ankaralı Namık (Turkish Singer)
- Faruk Dinç (Member of Turkish Parliament)
- Miraç Akdoğan (Former Member of Turkish Parliament)
- Mustafa Şahin (Former Member of Turkish Parliament)
- Kadir Koçdemir (Former Member of Turkish Parliament)
- Abdulkadir Karaduman (Former Member of Turkish Parliament)
- H. Uğur Polat (Former Mayor of Malatya, Former Mayor of Yeşilyurt, Malatya))
