= Governor of Tunceli =

Governor of a Turkish Province

Governor of Tunceli Tunceli Valiliği
- Logo of the Governor of Tunceli
- Incumbent; Şefik Aygöl since June 3, 2025
- Appointer: President of Turkey; On the recommendation of the Turkish government
- Term length: No set term length or limit
- Inaugural holder: Ekrem Baydar; 1937
- Website: Office of the Governor

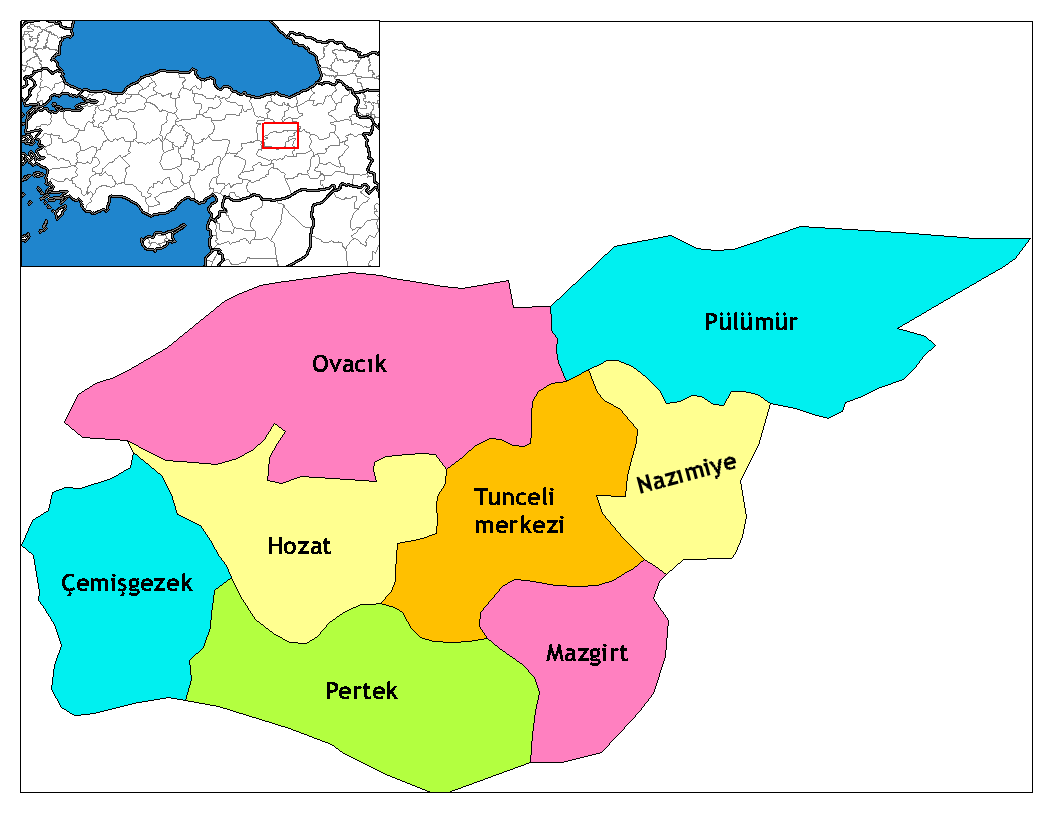
Map of the Province of Tunceli, showing the provincial districts.

The Governor of Tunceli (Turkish: Tunceli Valiliği) is the bureaucratic state official responsible for both national government and state affairs in the Province of Tunceli. Similar to the Governors of the 80 other Provinces of Turkey, the Governor of Tunceli is appointed by the Government of Turkey and is responsible for the implementation of government legislation within Tunceli. The Governor is also the most senior commander of both the Tunceli provincial police force and the Tunceli Gendarmerie.

== Appointment ==
The Governor of Tunceli is appointed by the President of Turkey, who confirms the appointment after recommendation from the Turkish Government. The Ministry of the Interior first considers and puts forward possible candidates for approval by the cabinet. The Governor of Tunceli is therefore not a directly elected position and instead functions as the most senior civil servant in the Province of Tunceli.

=== Term limits ===
Any term limits do not limit the Governor and do not serve for a set length of time. Instead, the Governor serves at the pleasure of the Government, which can appoint or reposition the Governor whenever it sees fit. Such decisions are again made by the cabinet of Turkey. The Governor of Tunceli, as a civil servant, may not have any close connections or prior experience in Tunceli Province. It is not unusual for Governors to alternate between several different Provinces during their bureaucratic career.

== Functions ==
The Governor of Tunceli has both bureaucratic functions and influence over local government. The main role of the Governor is to oversee the implementation of decisions by government ministries, constitutional requirements and legislation passed by Grand National Assembly within the provincial borders. The Governor also has the power to reassign, remove or appoint officials to a certain number of public offices and has the right to alter the role of certain public institutions if they see fit. Governors are also the most senior public officials within the Province, meaning they preside over any public ceremonies or provincial celebrations being held due to a national holiday. As the commander of the provincial police and Gendarmerie forces, the Governor can also make decisions designed to limit civil disobedience and preserve public order. Although mayors of municipalities and councilors are elected during local elections, the Governor has the right to re-organise or to inspect the proceedings of local government despite being in an unelected position.

== List of governors of Tunceli ==
- Ekrem Baydar (1937)
- Abdullah Alpdoğan (Askeri Vali, 1937–1943)
- Muzaffer Ergüder (Askeri Vali, 1943–1946)
- Ekrem Baydar (1946)
- Edip Yavuz (1947–1949)
- Hayri Orhun (1949–1950)
- Niyazi Akı (1950–1951)
- Cavit Kınay (1951–1952)
- Adil Dündar (1952–1954)
- Hasan Gürbüz (1954–1955)
- Mehmet Ali Çeltik (1955–1957)
- Şefik San (1957–1958)
- Muhlis Babaoğlu (1958–1960)
- Necdet Basat (1960)
- Fethi Tansuk (1960)
- S. Sıtkı Arkan (1960–1961)
- Ali Rıza Yaradanakul (1961–1963)
- Mustafa Yörükoğlu (1963–1964)
- Fikret Turgut Sayın (1964–1966)
- Sabahattin Çakmakoğlu (1966–1968)
- Nedim Evliya (1968–1971)
- Kemal Katıtaş (1971–1975)
- Yılmaz Ergun (1975–1978)
- Kenan Güven (1978–1980)
- Hasan Bamyacı (1980–1982)
- Kenan Güven (1982–1985)
- M. İlyas Aksoy (1985–1988)
- Hamdi Ardalı (1988)
- Adnan Darendeliler (1988–1991)
- Sami Sönmez (1991–1992)
- Aslan Yıldırım (1992–1993)
- Atilla Vural (1993–1996)
- Mehmet Ali Türker (1996–2000)
- Mustafa Erkal (2000–2003)
- Ali Cafer Akyüz (2003–2006)
- Mustafa Yaman (2006–2009)
- Mustafa Taşkesen (2009–2012)
- Hakan Yusuf Güner (2012–2014)
- Osman Kaymak (2014–2017)
- Tuncay Sonel (2017–2020)
- Mehmet Ali Özkan (2020–2023)
- Bülent Tekbıyıkoğlu (2023–2025)
- Şefik Aygöl (2025–)

== See also ==
- Governor (Turkey)
- Tunceli Province
- Ministry of the Interior (Turkey)
