= Kavaklıdere, Muğla =

Kavaklıdere
- District and municipality
- Map showing Kavaklıdere District in Muğla Province

- Location within Turkey Location within Turkey Aegean
- Coordinates: 37°26′49″N 28°21′48″E
- Country: Turkey
- Province: Muğla

Government
  - Mayor: Mehmet Demir (AKP)
- Area: 302 km^{2} (117 sq mi)
- Elevation: 880 m (2,890 ft)
- Population (2022): 10,909
  - Density: 36.1/km^{2} (93.6/sq mi)
- Time zone: UTC+3 (TRT)
- Postal code: 48570
- Area code: 0252
- Website: www.kavaklidere.bel.tr

Kavaklıdere is a municipality and district of Muğla Province, Turkey. Its area is 302 km^{2}, and its population is 10,909 (2022). It is notable for its marble and slate industry and the vast forests extending across the district. Its marbles exported to Italy are usually re-exported by that country under Italian labels.

Main Mosque and Town Hall of Kavaklıdere.

Copper Market on Turgut Özal Boulevard. Kavaklıdere.

Formerly a township part of Yatağan District, it was made into a separate district in 1990.

Its first prefect (or kaymakam), for three years, was Eyüp Sabri Kartal.

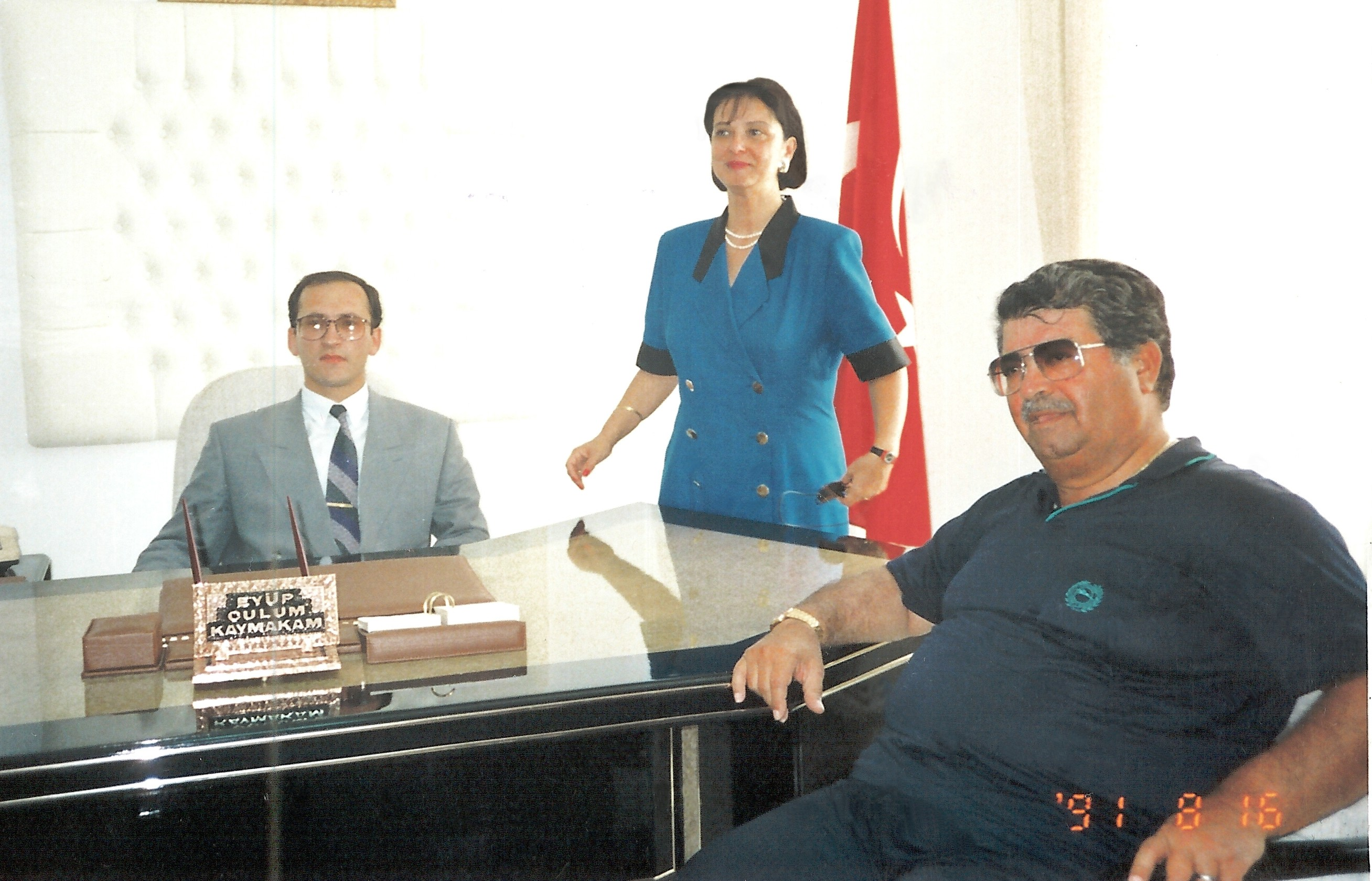
Governor Lale Aytaman is attending the district governorship visit of President Turgut Özal (right). Kavaklıdere, Muğla, August 16, 1991.

== Composition ==
There are 15 neighbourhoods in Kavaklıdere District:

- Bakırcılar
- Çamlıbel
- Çamlıyurt
- Çatak
- Çavdır
- Çayboyu
- Cumhuriyet
- Derebağ
- Kurucaova
- Menteşe
- Nebiler
- Ortaköy
- Salkım
- Yeni
- Yeşilköy

== Eğitim ==
There are 1 kindergarten, 6 primary schools, 3 secondary schools, 2 high schools, 1 public education center affiliated with the Ministry of National Education in the district.
