= Governor of Elazığ =

Governor of a Turkish Province

Governor of Elazığ Elazığ Valiliği
- Logo of the Governor of Elazığ
- Incumbent; Numan Hatipoğlu since 25 September 2024
- Appointer: President of Turkey; On the recommendation of the Turkish government
- Term length: No set term length or limit
- Inaugural holder: Hilmi Bey
- Formation: 1923
- Website: Office of the Governor

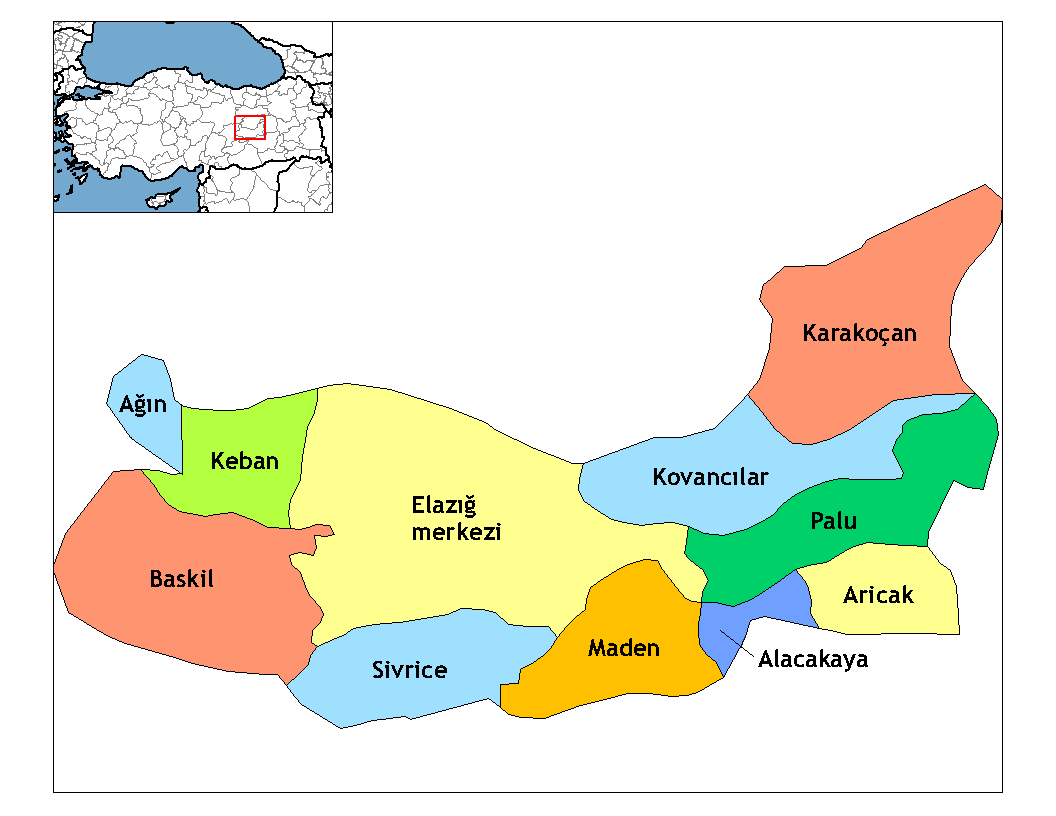
Map of the Province of Elazığ, showing the provincial districts.

The Governor of Elazığ (Turkish: Elazığ Valiliği) is the bureaucratic state official responsible for both national government and state affairs in the Province of Elazığ. Similar to the Governors of the 80 other Provinces of Turkey, the Governor of Elazığ is appointed by the Government of Turkey and is responsible for the implementation of government legislation within Elazığ. The Governor is also the most senior commander of both the Elazığ provincial police force and the Elazığ Gendarmerie.

== Appointment ==
The Governor of Elazığ is appointed by the President of Turkey, who confirms the appointment after recommendation from the Turkish Government. The Ministry of the Interior first considers and puts forward possible candidates for approval by the cabinet. The Governor of Elazığ is therefore not a directly elected position and instead functions as the most senior civil servant in the Province of Elazığ.

=== Term limits ===
The Governor is not limited by any term limits and does not serve for a set length of time. Instead, the Governor serves at the pleasure of the Government, which can appoint or reposition the Governor whenever it sees fit. Such decisions are again made by the cabinet of Turkey. The Governor of Elazığ, as a civil servant, may not have any close connections or prior experience in Elazığ Province. It is not unusual for Governors to alternate between several different Provinces during their bureaucratic career.

== Functions ==
The Governor of Elazığ has both bureaucratic functions and influence over local government. The main role of the Governor is to oversee the implementation of decisions by government ministries, constitutional requirements and legislation passed by Grand National Assembly within the provincial borders. The Governor also has the power to reassign, remove or appoint officials a certain number of public offices and has the right to alter the role of certain public institutions if they see fit. Governors are also the most senior public official within the Province, meaning that they preside over any public ceremonies or provincial celebrations being held due to a national holiday. As the commander of the provincial police and Gendarmerie forces, the Governor can also take decisions designed to limit civil disobedience and preserve public order. Although mayors of municipalities and councillors are elected during local elections, the Governor has the right to re-organise or to inspect the proceedings of local government despite being an unelected position.

== List of governors of Elazığ ==
- Hilmi Bey (1923–1925)
- Ali Rıza Ceylan (1925)
- Cemal Bardakçı (1926–1929)
- Fahri Bey (1929–1930)
- Nizamettin Ataker (1931–1932)
- Tevfik Sırrı Gür (1933–1937)
- Şefik Bicioğlu (1937–1939)
- Asım Türeli (1939–1941)
- Abdullah Feyzi Gürel (1941–1942)
- Hasan Basri Özdenkçi (1942–1944)
- Burhanettin Teker (1944–1945)
- Ziya Kasnakoğlu (1945–1946)
- Recai Türeli (1946–1948)
- Ahmet Demir (1948–1950)
- Fevzi Karakülah (1950–1951)
- Atıf Ulusoğlu (1951–1952)
- Mustafa Rauf İnan (1952–1953)
- Haluk Nihat Pepeyi (1953–1954)
- Mesut Çehreli (1954–1955)
- Eşref Ayhan (1955–1956)
- Ekrem Özsoy (1956–1960)
- Nadir Sünter (1960–1961)
- Sait Kemalî Atay (1961–1964)
- Ahmet Vefik Kitapçıgil (1964–1966)
- Ali Rıza Yaradanakul (1966–1968)
- Nezih Okuş (1968–1970)
- Mustafa Kemal Demirtaş (1970–1971)
- Sabahattin Çakmakoğlu (1971–1975)
- Fikret Turgut Sayın (1975–1978)
- Yılmaz Ergun (1978–1979)
- Kenan Güven (1979–1980)
- Hasan Bamyacı (1980–1984)
- Yalçın Küçük (1984–1988)
- Aykut Ozan (1988–1992)
- İsmet Metin (1992–1993)
- Ahmet Rıfat Kaplan (1993–1996)
- Lütfullah Bilgin (1996–2000)
- Turan Genç (2000)
- Osman Aydın (2000–2003)
- Kadir Koçdemir (2003–2006)
- Muammer Muşmal (2006–2009)
- Muammer Erol (2009–2013)
- Ömer Faruk Koçak (2013–2015)
- Murat Zorluoğlu (2015–2017)
- Çetin Oktay Kaldırım (2017–2020)
- Erkaya Yırık (2020–2021)
- Dr. Ömer Toraman (2021–2024)
- Numan Hatipoğlu (2024–)

== See also ==
- Governor (Turkey)
- Elazığ Province
- Ministry of the Interior (Turkey)
