= Lale Aytaman =

Turkish politician (born 1944)

Dr. Lale Aytaman
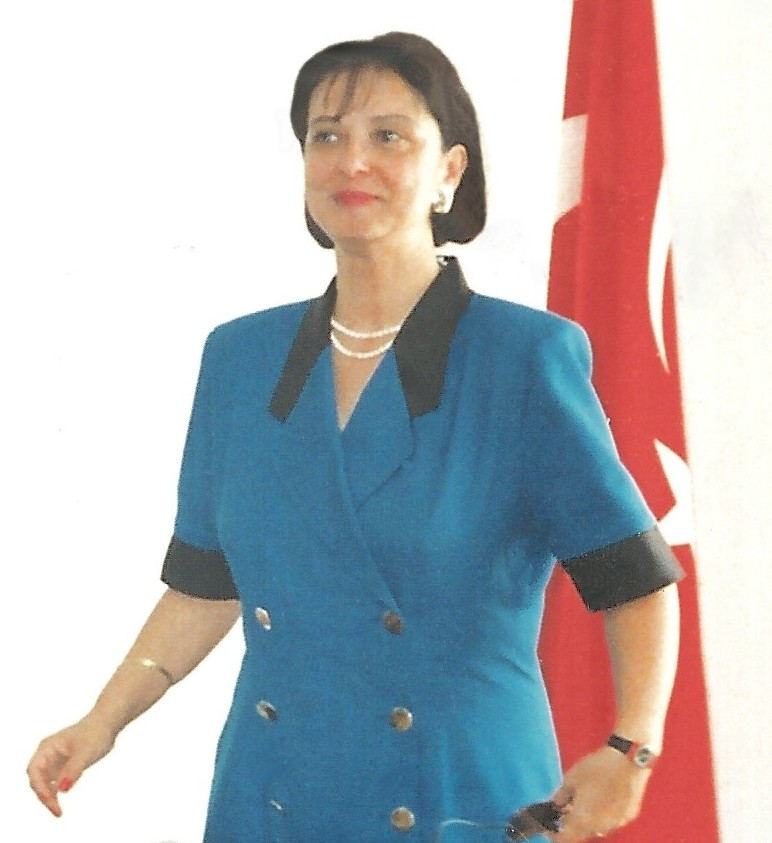
- Aytaman in 1991

24th Governor of Muğla
- In office July 6, 1991 – 1995
- Appointed by: Turgut Özal
- Preceded by: Erol Çakır
- Succeeded by: Ahmet Cemil Serhadlı

Member of the Grand National Assembly
- In office January 8, 1996 – March 25, 1999
- Constituency: Muğla (1995)

Personal details
- Born: Lale Köseoğlu; June 11, 1944 (age 82) Istanbul, Turkey
- Party: Motherland Party
- Spouse: Reha Aytaman
- Children: 1
- Education: Istanbul University

Dr. Lale Aytaman (born 1944) was the governor of Muğla province in Turkey from 1991 to 1995 and the first female governor of Turkey.

== Education ==
Lale Aytaman finished St. George's Austrian High School (Turkish: Avusturya Kız Lisesi) in Istanbul. She was an AFS-exchange student in 1962 in Phoenix, Arizona. She studied German literature at Istanbul University, then went to Hamburg in Germany, where she continued her studies and earned her Ph.D.

== Career ==
She was a professor at Boğaziçi University and she became the first female governor of Turkey on 6 July 1991, was appointed to this position by President Turgut Özal. She served as governor of Muğla Province from 1991 to 1995. She is well known for her engagement for the protection of the environment, cultural heritage, and promoting tourism in her region. She helped women for promoting their handicrafts. The Muğla Handicrafts project was created to preserve the traditional way of cotton and silk weaving. The University of Mugla, Turolian Park, and Iassos Museum were opened during her governorship.

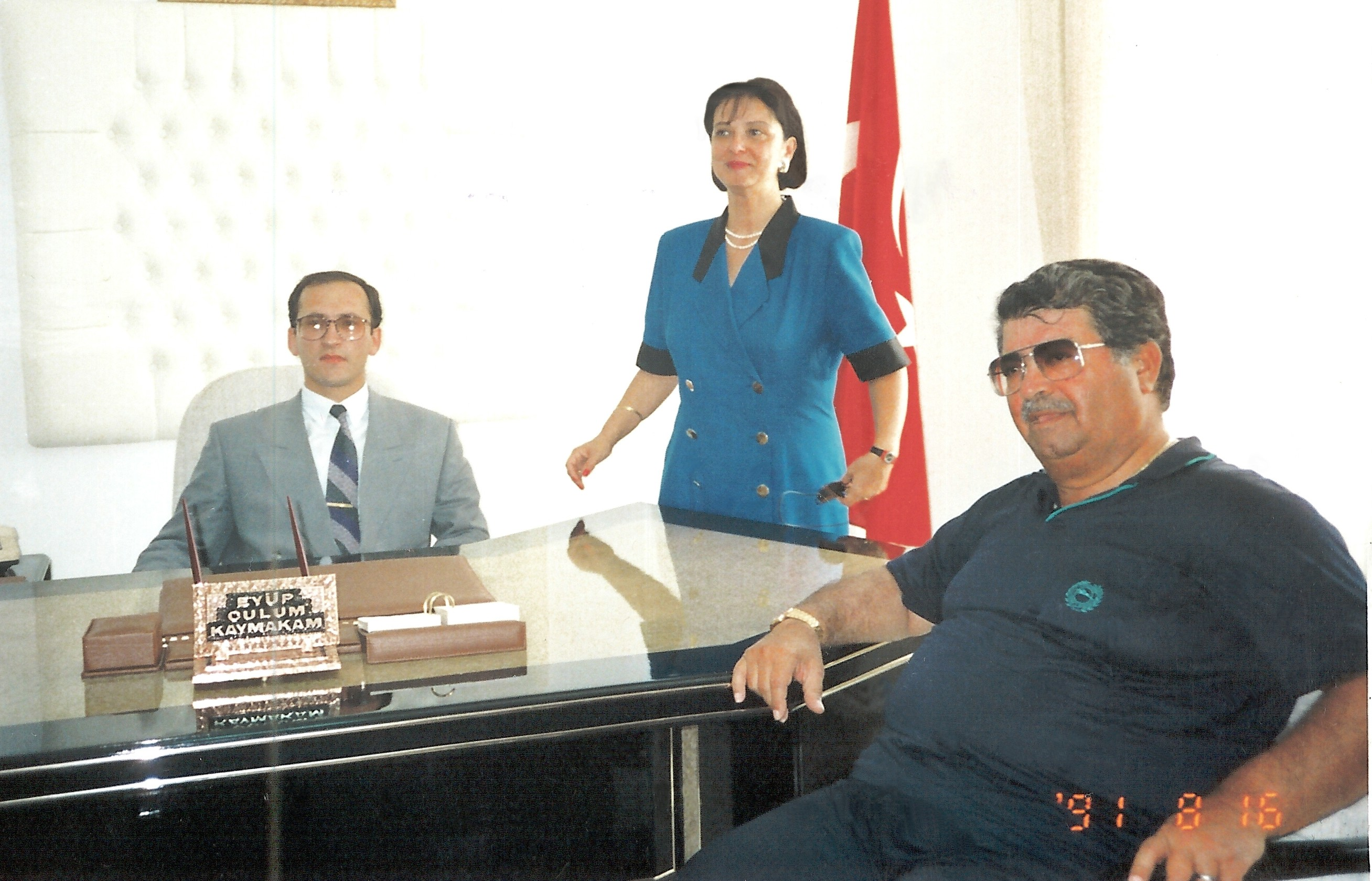
Governor Lale Aytaman is attending the district governorship visit of President Turgut Özal (right). Kavaklıdere, Muğla, August 16, 1991.

She was head of the Turkish delegation to the Congress for Local and Regional Authorities of Council of Europe in 1995 when she was elected as an MP from the province of Muğla. She was a member of the Motherland Party (ANAP) and a member of the Turkish delegation to the Parliamentary Assembly of Council of Europe and Western European Union.

She became the first Turkish parliamentarian at the Council of Europe who was elected as President of a Committee. She was president of the Committee for Environment, local and regional authorities. She prepared together with Sir John Hunt, the "Black Sea Report" at the WEU.

She is an honorary member of the Council of Europe.
