= Menteşe, Kavaklıdere =

Menteşe
- Neighbourhood
- Location in Turkey Menteşe (Turkey Aegean)
- Coordinates: 37°25′N 28°26′E
- Country: Turkey
- Province: Muğla
- District: Kavaklıdere
- Elevation: 785 m (2,575 ft)
- Population (2022): 2,062
- Time zone: UTC+3 (TRT)
- Postal code: 48570
- Area code: 0252

Menteşe (former Genek) is a neighbourhood of the municipality and district of Kavaklıdere, Muğla Province, Turkey. Its population is 2,062 (2022). Before the 2013 reorganisation, it was a town (belde).

== Geography ==
The town is situated in the forests of South West Anatolia. The distance to Kavaklıdere is about 10 kilometres (6.2 mi).

== History ==
In antiquity, the area around Menteşe was a part of Caria. In 1270, it became a part of Seljuks of Turkey which was in the state of disintegration. It was named after a Turkmen leader named Menteşe. In 1424 the area was incorporated into Ottoman realm. The exact foundation date of the settlement is not known. But according to tradition the settlement was founded by a tribe leader named Çoban Yürük Hacı Mehmet Şeyh. Settlement was declared a seat of township in 1972.

== Economy ==
The economy of the town depends on agriculture as well as small industry. Hickory nut, chesnut and cherry are among the main crops. Carpet weaving, copper works and whitesmithing are the small industries of the town.
