= Kadir Koçdemir =

Turkish politician

Member of the Grand National Assembly
- In office 7 June 2015 – 7 July 2018
- Constituency: Bursa (June 2015, Nov 2015)

30th Governor of Eskişehir
- In office 18 July 2011 – 16 May 2013
- President: Abdullah Gül
- Preceded by: Mehmet Kılıçlar
- Succeeded by: Güngör Azim Tuna

40th Governor of Elazığ
- In office 19 December 2003 – 2 January 2006
- President: Ahmet Necdet Sezer
- Preceded by: Osman Aydın
- Succeeded by: Muammer Muşmal

Personal details
- Born: 1964 (age 61–62) Orhaneli, Bursa, Turkey
- Party: İYİ Party
- Education: University of Ankara
- Occupation: Civil servant, politician

Kadir Koçdemir (born 1964) is a Turkish politician, author and former governor.

== Political career ==
He has served as the Member of Parliament for the province of Bursa, as part of the Nationalist Movement Party (MHP) since 7 June 2015.

Koçdemir was born in the village of Dündar, located in the Orhaneli district of Bursa, Turkey. He completed his primary level education in Bursa, before going on to undertake secondary education in Arifiye and Gökçeada. In 1985, he graduated from the University of Ankara in the Faculty of Political Sciences. He went to Germany for Public Administration Internships (1987-1988). After gaining a Jean Monnet scholarship, Koçdemir returned to Germany, where he received his master's degree in European Union and Administrative Law from the Faculty of Law of the University of Hamburg (1991-1992). Later, he received a master's degree in Administrative Structure and Development from the University of İnönü (1996). He completed his Public Diplomacy Course (1998) and National Security Academy (1999). Furthering his progress as an academic, Koçdemir earned his PhD on the subject of the Modern Nation-State and Globalization from the University of Hacettepe (2004). In addition to this, he was given an honorary doctorate from the Vector Azerbaijan International Scientific Center (2004).

Koçdemir started work as a district governor candidate of Ağrı in 1985. After this, he went on to work as the district governor of Şebinkarahisar (1988), Eskipazar (1989-1992), Kulp (1992-1994) and Afşin (1994-1996).

He served as a head of department (1996-1998) and assistant general manager (1998-2000) in the General Management of Local Authorities. Later, he became the governor of Burdur (2000-2003), deputy governor of Eskişehir (2003), governor of Elazığ (2003-2006) and governor of Eskişehir (2011-2013).

Koçdemir began his career in politics as the mayoral candidate for the Nationalist Movement Party (MHP) for Bursa in the 2014 local elections. In the Turkish general election that took place on 7 June 2015, he was elected into the Grand National Assembly of Turkey as an MP for the province of Bursa. He was then elected once again in the 1 November 2015 general election. He is member of Turkey-EU Joint Parliamentary Committee and the Committee on EU Harmonization.

== Personal life ==
He is married and has four children, can speak German and English and has published two books: Globalization: Reading Coordinates (2002) and Nation-State and Globalization (2004).
