= Governor of Balıkesir =

Governor of a Turkish Province

Governor of Balıkesir Balıkesir Valiliği
- Logo of the Governor of Balıkesir
- Incumbent; İsmail Ustaoğlu since August 10, 2023
- Appointer: President of Turkey On the recommendation of the Turkish government
- Term length: No set term length or limit
- Inaugural holder: İsmail Hakkı Ildır; October 1, 1923
- Website: Office of the Governor

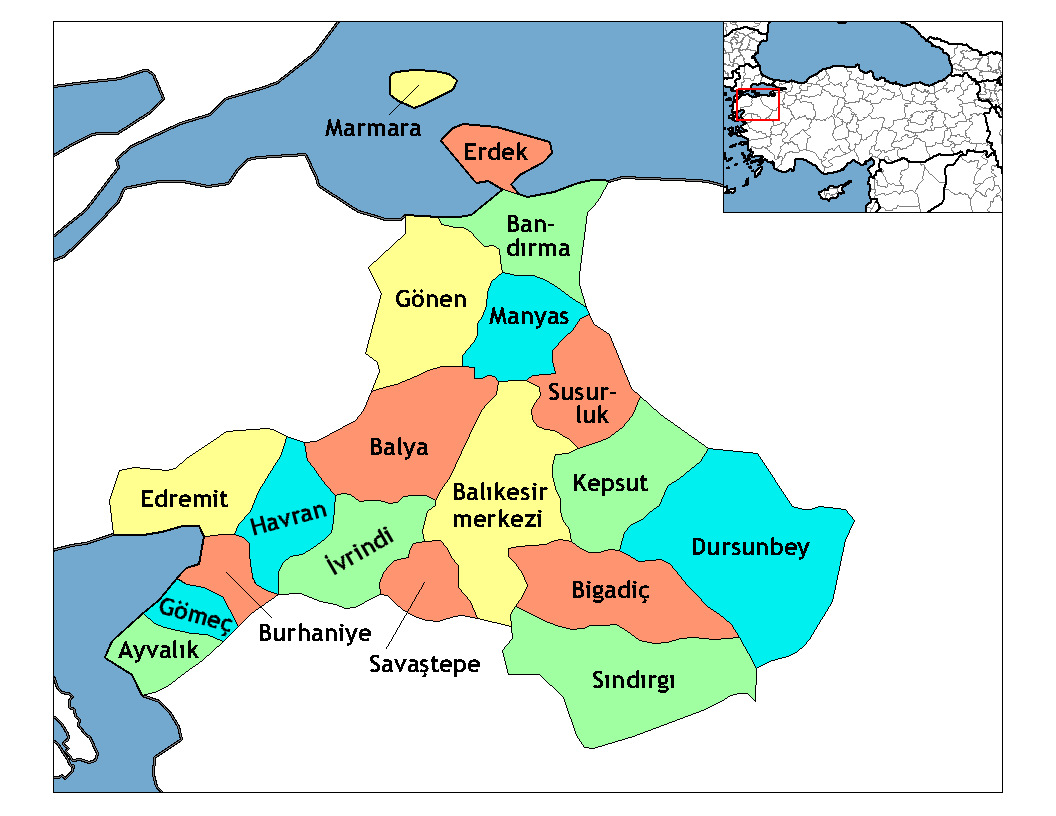
Map of the Province of Balıkesir, showing the provincial districts.

The Governor of Balıkesir (Turkish: Balıkesir Valiliği) is the bureaucratic state official responsible for both national government and state affairs in the Province of Balıkesir. Similar to the Governors of the 80 other Provinces of Turkey, the Governor of Balıkesir is appointed by the Government of Turkey and is responsible for the implementation of government legislation within Balıkesir. The Governor is also the most senior commander of both the Balıkesir provincial police force and the Balıkesir Gendarmerie.

== Appointment ==
The Governor of Balıkesir is appointed by the President of Turkey, who confirms the appointment after recommendation from the Turkish Government. The Ministry of the Interior first considers and puts forward possible candidates for approval by the cabinet. The Governor of Balıkesir is therefore not a directly elected position and instead functions as the most senior civil servant in the Province of Balıkesir.

=== Term limits ===
The Governor is not limited by any term limits and does not serve for a set length of time. Instead, the Governor serves at the pleasure of the Government, which can appoint or reposition the Governor whenever it sees fit. Such decisions are again made by the cabinet of Turkey. The Governor of Balıkesir, as a civil servant, may not have any close connections or prior experience in Balıkesir Province. It is not unusual for Governors to alternate between several different Provinces during their bureaucratic career.

== Functions ==
The Governor of Balıkesir has both bureaucratic functions and influence over local government. The main role of the Governor is to oversee the implementation of decisions by government ministries, constitutional requirements and legislation passed by Grand National Assembly within the provincial borders. The Governor also has the power to reassign, remove or appoint officials a certain number of public offices and has the right to alter the role of certain public institutions if they see fit. Governors are also the most senior public official within the Province, meaning that they preside over any public ceremonies or provincial celebrations being held due to a national holiday. As the commander of the provincial police and Gendarmerie forces, the Governor can also take decisions designed to limit civil disobedience and preserve public order. Although mayors of municipalities and councillors are elected during local elections, the Governor has the right to re-organise or to inspect the proceedings of local government despite being an unelected position.

== List of governors of Balıkesir ==
- Fahrettin Tiritoğlu (1923–1925)
- Mümtaz Bey (1925–1927)
- Salim Özdemir Günday (1927–1931)
- İbrahim Ethem Akıncı (1931–1933)
- Salim Gündoğan (1934–1936)
- İbrahim Ethem Aykut (1936–1939)
- Recai Güreli (1939–1943)
- Hasan Faik Türeli (1943–1944)
- Mustafa Sabri Öney (1944–1945)
- Fazlı Güleç (1945–1948)
- Ziya Tekeli (1948–1950)
- Sıddık Fehmi Tümürkan (1950)
- Esat Kaya Ayman (1950–1951)
- Recai Türeli (1951–1952)
- Nurettin Aynuksa (1952–1955)
- Mehmet Hilmi İncesulu (1955–1957)
- Kazım Arat (1957–1960)
- Sait Koçak (Askeri vali) (1960)
- Zahid Kırağlı (1960–1964)
- Fethi Tansuk (1964–1965)
- Mehmet Fahri Centel (1965–1967)
- Fahrettin Akkutlu (1967–1970)
- Niyazi Akı (1970–1975)
- Naci Babacan (1975–1978)
- İbrahim Önen (1978–1979)
- Münir Raif Güney (1979–1980)
- Nihat Oğuz Bor (1980)
- Orhan Erbuğ (1980–1981)
- Fikret Turgut Sayın (1981–1983)
- Ahmet Başsoy (1983–1985)
- Fevzi Yetkiner (1985–1988)
- Kemal Esensoy (1988–1991)
- Enver Hızlan (1991–1992)
- Kadir Uysal (1992–1993)
- Rıza Akdemir (1993–1995)
- Yahya Gür (1995–1997)
- Alaaddin Yüksel (1997–2000)
- Utku Acun (2000–2003)
- Atıl Üzelgün (2003–2005)
- Selahattin Hatipoğlu (2006–2009)
- Yılmaz Arslan (2009–2012)
- Ahmet Turhan (2012–2014)
- Mustafa Yaman (2014–2016)
- Ersin Yazıcı (2016–2023)
- İsmail Ustaoğlu (2023–)

== See also ==
- Governor (Turkey)
- Balıkesir Province
- Ministry of the Interior (Turkey)
