= Governor of Muğla =

Governor of a Turkish Province

Governor of Muğla Muğla Valiliği
- Logo of the Governor of Muğla
- Incumbent; İdris Akbıyık since August 18, 2023
- Appointer: President of Turkey; On the recommendation of the Turkish government
- Term length: No set term length or limit
- Inaugural holder: Asaf Bey; 1923
- Website: Office of the Governor

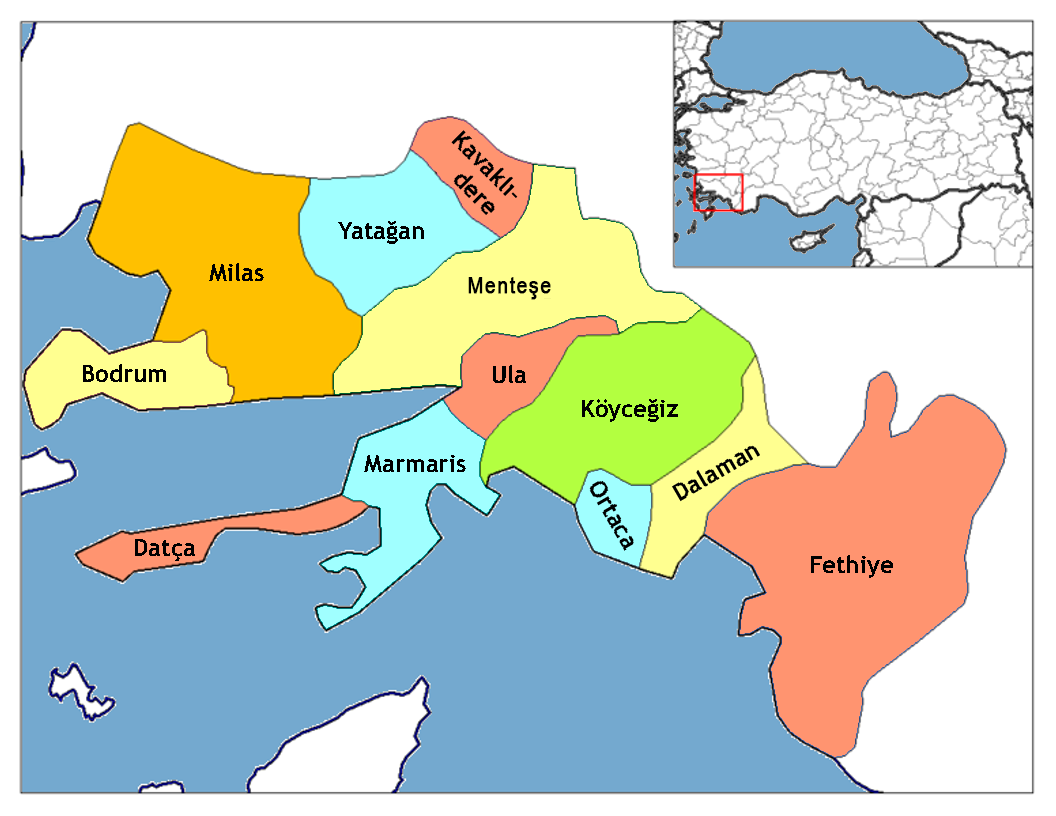
Map of the Province of Muğla, showing the provincial districts.

Governor of Muğla (Turkish: Muğla Valiliği) is the civil service official responsible for both national government and state affairs in the Province of Muğla. Similar to the Governors of the 80 other Provinces of Turkey, the Governor of Muğla is appointed by the Government of Turkey and is responsible for the implementation of government legislation within Muğla. The Governor is also the most senior commander of both the Muğla provincial police force and the Muğla Gendarmerie.

== Appointment ==
The Governor of Muğla is appointed by the President of Turkey, who confirms the appointment after recommendation from the Turkish Government. The Ministry of the Interior first considers and puts forward possible candidates for approval by the cabinet. The Governor of Muğla is therefore not a directly elected position and instead functions as the most senior civil servant in the province of Muğla.

=== Term limits ===
The Governor is not limited by any term limits and does not serve for a set length of time. Instead, the Governor serves at the pleasure of the Government, which can appoint or reposition the Governor whenever it sees fit. Such decisions are again made by the cabinet of Turkey. The Governor of Muğla, as a civil servant, may not have any close connections or prior experience in Muğla Province. It is not unusual for Governors to alternate between several different Provinces during their bureaucratic career.

== Functions ==
The Governor of Muğla has both bureaucratic functions and influence over local government. The main role of the Governor is to oversee the implementation of decisions by government ministries, constitutional requirements and legislation passed by Grand National Assembly within the provincial borders. The Governor also has the power to reassign, remove or appoint officials a certain number of public offices and has the right to alter the role of certain public institutions if they see fit. Governors are also the most senior public official within the Province, meaning that they preside over any public ceremonies or provincial celebrations being held due to a national holiday. As the commander of the provincial police and Gendarmerie forces, the Governor can also take decisions designed to limit civil disobedience and preserve public order. Although mayors of municipalities and councillors are elected during local elections, the Governor has the right to re-organise or to inspect the proceedings of local government despite being an unelected position.

== List of governors of Muğla ==
- H. Asaf Bey (1923–1924)
- Hüsnü Bey (1924–1926)
- Halil Rifat Bey (1926–1928)
- Salih Cemal Bey (1928–1932)
- Ömer Cevat Ökmen (1932–1936)
- Recai Güreli (1936–1939)
- İbrahim Ethem Akıncı (1939–1949)
- Muzaffer Kuşakçıoğlu (1949–1950)
- Cavit Kınay (1950)
- Kâmuran Çuhruk (1950–1951)
- Adnan Dilaver Argun (1951–1953)
- Niyazi Akı (1953–1956)
- Esat Kaya Ayman (1956–1959)
- Ziya Çoker (1959–1960)
- Sadık Erdem (1960)
- Hikmet Baloğlu (1960–1962)
- Mehmet Saraçoğlu (1962–1964)
- Hasan Basri Kurdoğlu (1964–1966)
- Nafiz Budunç (1966–1968)
- Çetin Birmek (1968–1971)
- Fahri Centel (1971–1975)
- Münir Raif Güney (1975–1978)
- Erol Çakır (1978–1979)
- Hüseyin Öğütçen (1979–1980)
- Mustafa Gönül (1980–1984)
- Arif Atilla Osmançelebioğlu (1984–1988)
- Kamil Demircioğlu (1988–1991)
- Lale Aytaman (1991–1995)
- Cemal Ayman (1995–1999)
- Ahmet Cemil Serhadlı (1999–2003)
- Hüseyin Avni Coş (2003–2006)
- Temel Koçaklar (2006–2008)
- Ahmet Altıparmak (2008–2010)
- Fatih Şahin (2010–2013)
- Mustafa Hakan Güvençer (2013–2014)
- Amir Çiçek (2014–2017)
- Esengül Civelek (2017–2020)
- Orhan Tavlı (2020–2023)
- Dr. İdris Akbıyık (2023–)

== See also ==
- Governor (Turkey)
- Muğla Province
- Ministry of the Interior (Turkey)
