= Muzaffer Ergüder =

Turkish politician

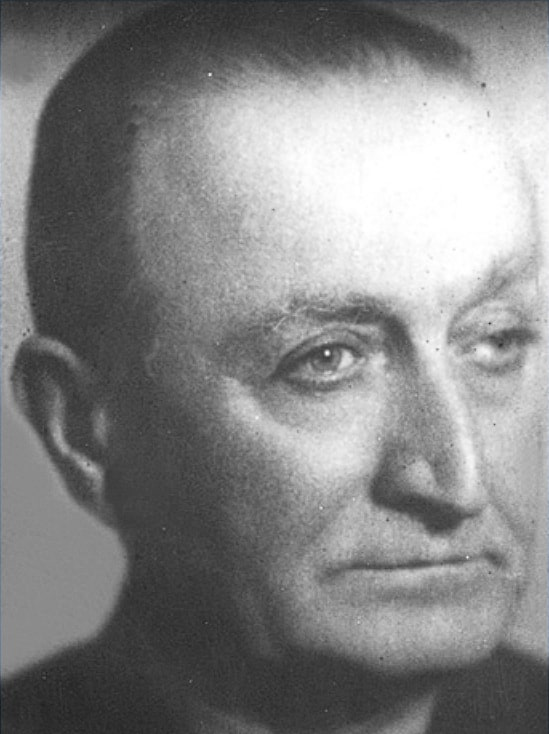

Member of the Grand National Assembly
- Constituency: Ankara (1954)

Personal details
- Born: 1886 Bursa, Ottoman Empire
- Died: 19 February 1962 (aged 75–76)
- Party: Democrat Party
- Education: Turkish Military Academy
- Awards: Gallipoli Star; Iron Cross; Medal of Independence

Military service
- Allegiance: Ottoman Empire; Turkey (from 1920)
- Branch/service: Turkish Land Forces
- Years of service: 1909-1950
- Rank: General
- Battles/wars: Italo-Turkish War; Balkan Wars; World War I; Turkish War of Independence

Muzaffer Ergüder (1886 – 19 February 1962) was a Turkish general and politician. He was elected as a member of the Grand National Assembly of Turkey for Ankara from the Democrat Party in the 1954 general election.
