= Governor of Eskişehir =

Governor of a Turkish Province

Governor of Eskişehir Eskişehir Valiliği
- Logo of the Governor of Eskişehir
- Incumbent; Erdinç Yılmaz since January 21, 2026
- Appointer: President of Turkey; On the recommendation of the Turkish government
- Term length: No set term length or limit
- Inaugural holder: Ali Nihat Bey; 1923
- Website: Office of the Governor

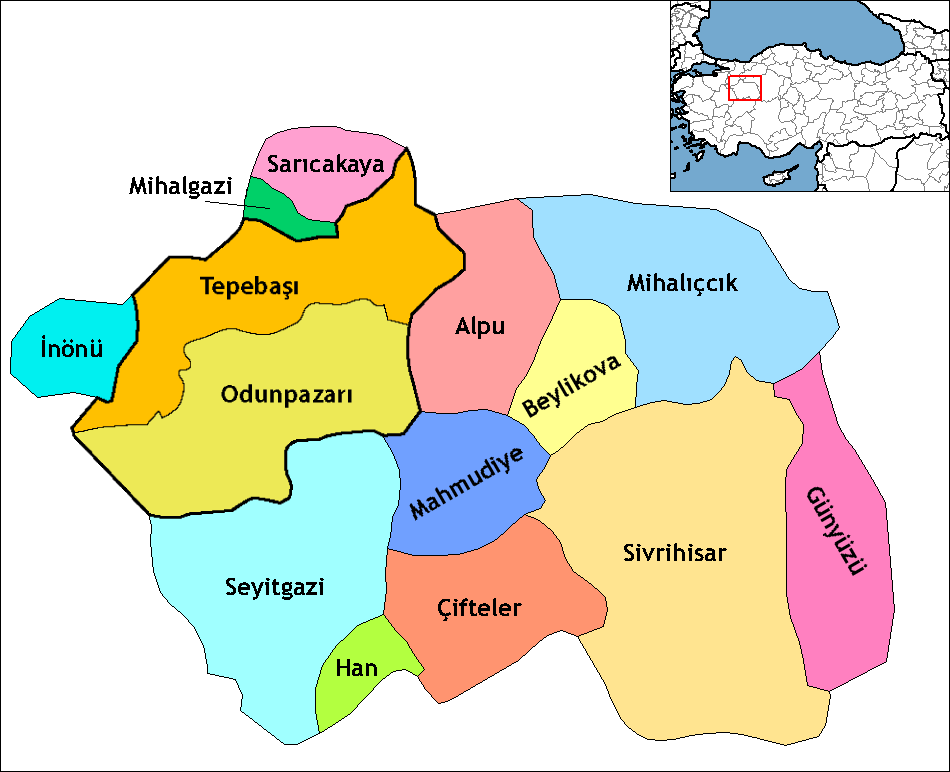
Map of the Province of Eskişehir, showing the provincial districts.

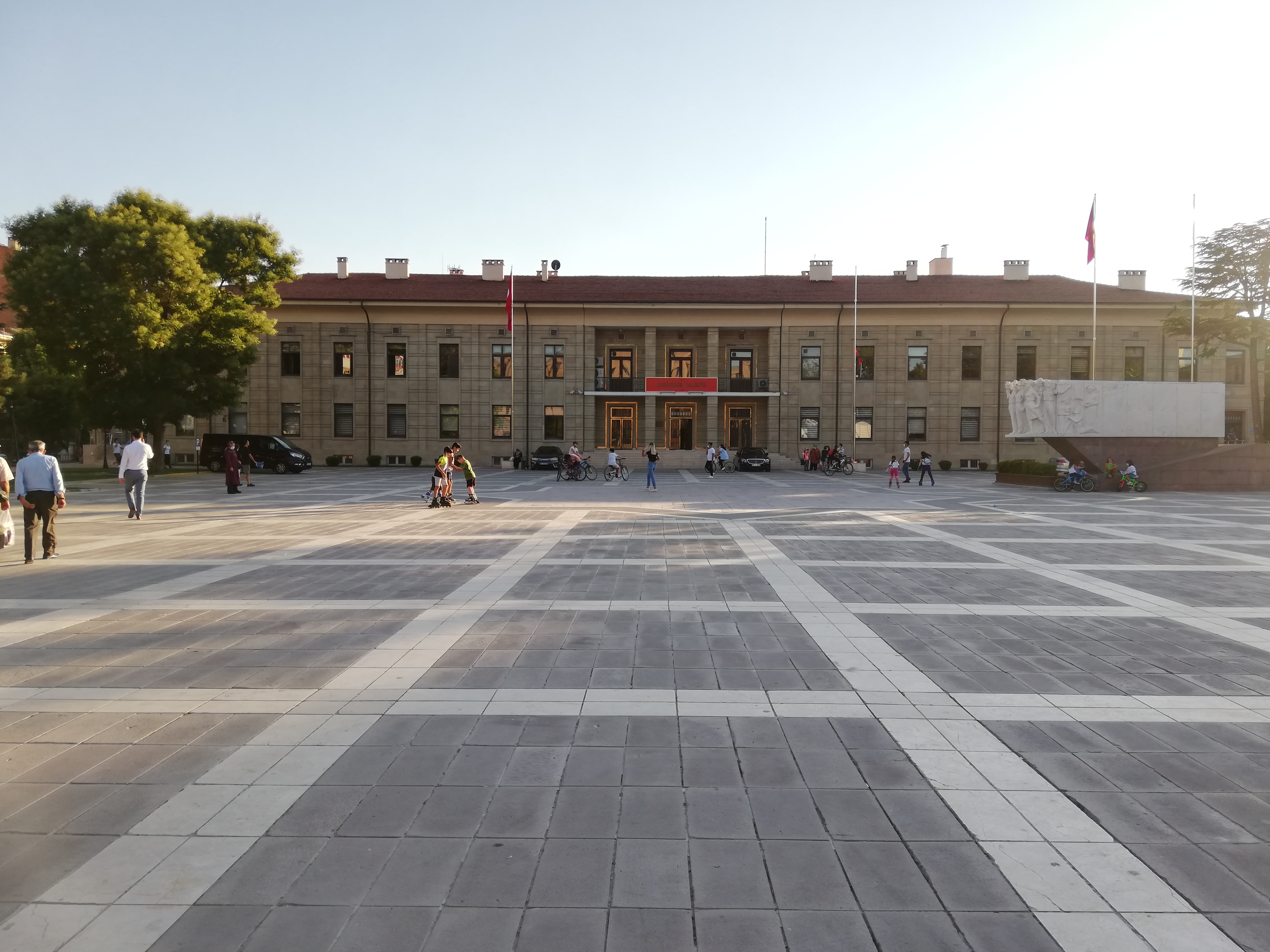
Building of the governorate

The Governor of Eskişehir (Turkish: Eskişehir Valiliği) is the bureaucratic state official responsible for both national government and state affairs in the Province of Eskişehir. Similar to the Governors of the 80 other Provinces of Turkey, the Governor of Eskişehir is appointed by the Government of Turkey and is responsible for the implementation of government legislation within Eskişehir. The Governor is also the most senior commander of both the Eskişehir provincial police force and the Eskişehir Gendarmerie.

== Appointment ==
The Governor of Eskişehir is appointed by the President of Turkey, who confirms the appointment after recommendation from the Turkish Government. The Ministry of the Interior first considers and puts forward possible candidates for approval by the cabinet. The Governor of Eskişehir is therefore not a directly elected position and instead functions as the most senior civil servant in the province of Eskişehir.

=== Term limits ===
The Governor is not limited by any term limits and does not serve for a set length of time. Instead, the Governor serves at the pleasure of the Government, which can appoint or reposition the Governor whenever it sees fit. Such decisions are again made by the cabinet of Turkey. The Governor of Eskişehir, as a civil servant, may not have any close connections or prior experience in Eskişehir Province. It is not unusual for Governors to alternate between several different Provinces during their bureaucratic career.

== Functions ==
The Governor of Eskişehir has both bureaucratic functions and influence over local government. The main role of the Governor is to oversee the implementation of decisions by government ministries, constitutional requirements and legislation passed by Grand National Assembly within the provincial borders. The Governor also has the power to reassign, remove or appoint officials a certain number of public offices and has the right to alter the role of certain public institutions if they see fit. Governors are also the most senior public official within the Province, meaning that they preside over any public ceremonies or provincial celebrations being held due to a national holiday. As the commander of the provincial police and Gendarmerie forces, the Governor can also take decisions designed to limit civil disobedience and preserve public order. Although mayors of municipalities and councillors are elected during local elections, the Governor has the right to re-organise or to inspect the proceedings of local government despite being an unelected position.

== List of governors of Eskişehir ==
- Ali Nihat Bey (1923–1925)
- Tamburi Cemil Bey (1925–1927)
- İsmail Hakkı Bey (1927–1935)
- Talat Öncel (1935–1936)
- Kadri Üçok (1936–1938)
- Yahya Sezai Üçok (1938–1939)
- Şükrü Yaşin (1939–1941)
- İsmail Hamit Oktay (1941–1943)
- Daniş Yurdakul (1943–1949)
- Ahmet Kınık (1949–1950)
- Arif Özgen (1950–1959)
- İbrahim Tevfik Kutlar (1959–1960)
- Süleyman Utkun (1960)
- Raşit Demirtaş (1960)
- İhsan Özalp (1960–1962)
- İhsan Tekin (1962–1966)
- Osman Meriç (1966–1967)
- Mustafa Karaer (1967–1971)
- Mehmet Saraçoğlu (1971–1975)
- Münir Raif Güney (1975–1978)
- Ahmet Nazif Demiröz (1978–1979)
- Naim Cömertoğlu (1979–1982)
- Halil Ömeroğlu (1982–1984)
- Hanifi Demirkol (1984–1988)
- Bahaeddin Güney (1988–1992)
- Ali Fuat Güven (1992–1999)
- Sami Sönmez (1999–2003)
- Kadir Koçdemir (vekil) (2003)
- Kadir Çalışıcı (2003–2008)
- Mehmet Kılıçlar (2008–2011)
- Kadir Koçdemir (2011–2013)
- Güngör Azim Tuna (2013–2016)
- Azmi Çelik (2016–2017)
- Özdemir Çakacak (2017–2020)
- Erol Ayyıldız (2020-)
- Hüseyin Aksoy (2023–2026)
- Dr. Erdinç Yılmaz (2026–)

== See also ==
- Governor (Turkey)
- Eskişehir Province
- Ministry of the Interior (Turkey)
