= 2003 in Turkey =

- Centuries: 20th; 21st
- Decades: 1980s; 1990s; 2000s; 2010s; 2020s
- See also: List of years in Turkey

The following lists events from 2003 in Turkey.

== Incumbents ==
- President: Ahmet Necdet Sezer
- Prime Minister: Abdullah Gül (until 14 March), Recep Tayyip Erdoğan (starting 14 March)

== Events ==
=== January ===
- January 8 – The Turkish Airlines Flight 634 was operated by Avro RJ100 TC-THG, which crashed in extensive fog during its final approach to land. All five of the crew and seventy of the seventy-five passengers died while the remaining five passengers survived with serious injuries.
- January 18 – Many people protested against the plans of the United States to invade Iraq in Istanbul.

=== February ===
- February 10 – France and Belgium broke the NATO procedure of silent approval concerning the timing of protective measures for Turkey in case of a possible war with Iraq. Germany said it supports this veto. The procedure was put into operation on February 6 by secretary general George Robertson. In response Turkey called upon Article 4 of the NATO Treaty, which stipulates that member states must deliberate when asked to do so by another member state if it feels threatened.
- February 18 – Hours before the first ships transporting heavy United States military equipment to Turkey were supposed to reach port, the Turkish government announces that it will withhold approval to dock unless the United States increases a reciprocal $6 billion foreign aid grant to $10 billion. The Bush administration indicated that no substantial changes will be made to the proposed aid package.
- February 25 – Both major parties of Kurdistan, an autonomous region in Northern Iraq, vow to fight Turkish troops if they enter Kurdistan to capture Mosul or interfere in Kurdish self-rule. Between them the two parties can mobilize up to 80,000 guerillas – most likely no match for the modern Turkish army, but a severe blow to the unity of U.S. allies on the Northern front expected in the U.S. plan to invade Iraq.
- February 27 – Rauf Denktaş, chief of the Turkish Cypriots, rejected the latest version of a United Nations plan to reunite Cyprus.

=== March ===
- March 1 – The Turkish speaker of Parliament voids the vote accepting U.S. troops involved in the planned invasion of Iraq into Turkey on constitutional grounds. Due to 19 abstentions, 264 votes for and 250 against accepting 62,000 U.S. military personnel do not constitute the necessary majority under the Turkish constitution.
- March 3 – Under intense American pressure, Turkey indicates that its Parliament will consider a second vote on whether to allow U.S. troops to use Turkish bases for a military attack on Iraq.
- March 10 – Recep Tayyip Erdoğan is elected to the Turkish parliament and is expected to become Prime Minister shortly. Erdoğan supports deployment of US troops in Turkey and is expected to call for a new vote on the issue as one of his first official acts.
- March 11 – Kofi Annan, Secretary General of the United Nations, announces that UN-sponsored talks on the reunification of Cyprus have failed. Cyprus remains a candidate for EU membership and the Greek Cypriot government intends to sign on behalf of the whole island. Analysts suggested that Turkish opposition to unification may hurt Turkey's chances of joining the EU.
- March 12 – The European Court of Human Rights rules that the Turkish trial of Kurdish leader Abdullah Öcalan was not fair.
- March 28 – Turkish Airlines' Airbus A310 was hijacked shortly after leaving Istanbul. At least three Turkish parliamentarians are among 196 passengers and eight aircrew members on the Flight TK 160 landed in Athens, Greece. The hijacker surrendered later in the day.

=== April ===
- April 24 – A dozen Turkish special forces were arrested in Da Quq, Iraq.

=== May ===
- May 1 – The 6.4 M_{w} Bingöl earthquake shook eastern Turkey with a maximum Mercalli intensity of IX (Violent), killing 176 and injuring 520 people. More than 600 buildings collapsed or suffered heavy damage.
- May 24 - Sertab Erener wins the Eurovision Song Contest with the song Everyway That I Can, Turkey's first victory in the contest.
- May 26 – The UM Airlines Flight 4230 was a chartered Yakovlev Yak-42 which crashed near Maçka, Turkey. All 13 crew and 62 passengers were killed in the crash and it remains the third-worst crash in Turkish aviation history.

=== July ===
- July 4 – A Turkish military personnel operating in northern Iraq were captured, led away with hoods over their heads, and interrogated by the United States military.

=== November ===
- November 15 – Two trucks carrying bombs slammed into the Bet Israel and Neve Shalom synagogues in Istanbul and exploded. The explosions devastated the synagogues and killed twenty-seven people, most of them Turkish citizens, and injured more than 300 others. An Islamic militant group, IBDA-C, claimed responsibility for the blasts, but Turkish government officials dismissed these claims, pointing out that this minor group did not have enough resources to carry out such an intricately planned and expensive attack.
- November 20 – Two more truck bombs exploded at the headquarters of HSBC Bank AS and the British Consulate, killing thirty people and wounding 400 others. The bombers appeared to have waited for the traffic lights in front of the HSBC headquarters on the Büyükdere Avenue in Levent to turn red to maximize the effects. Several Britons were killed in the two attacks, including the top British official in Istanbul, consul general Roger Short, while the rest of the victims were mostly Turkish citizens (such as actor and singer Kerem Yılmazer), as in the earlier synagogue blasts.

== See also ==
- 2003 in Turkish television
- Turkey in the Eurovision Song Contest 2003
