= 2001 in Turkey =

- Centuries: 20th; 21st
- Decades: 1980s; 1990s; 2000s; 2010s; 2020s
- See also: List of years in Turkey

Events in the year 2001 in Turkey.

== Incumbents ==
- President: Ahmet Necdet Sezer
- Prime Minister: Bülent Ecevit

== Events ==
- July - 2001 sex strike for running water: 600 women in a village named Sırtköy go on a sex strike in order to get a broken water system fixed.

== Deaths ==
- 1 April - Ayhan Şahenk, Turkish businessman, founded Doğuş Holding (b. 1929)
- 11 September - Hikmet Şimşek.
- 22 September - Fikret Kızılok.
