= 2002 in Turkey =

- Centuries: 20th; 21st
- Decades: 1980s; 1990s; 2000s; 2010s; 2020s
- See also: List of years in Turkey

Events in the year 2002 in Turkey.

== Elections ==
- 2002 Turkish general election

== Incumbents ==
- President: Ahmet Necdet Sezer
- Prime Minister: Bülent Ecevit (until 18 November), Abdullah Gül (from 18 November)

=== Governors ===
- Adana: Oğuz Kağan Köksal
- Adıyaman: Halil Işık
- Afyonkarahisar: Ahmet Özyurt
- Ağrı: Tahsin Cumhur Ersoy
- Aksaray: Kadir Çalışıcı
- Amasya: Hüseyin Poroy
- Ankara: Yahya Gür
- Antalya: Ertuğrul Dokuzoğlu
- Ardahan: Mustafa Yiğit
- Artvin: Hasan Canpolat
- Aydın: Emir Duramaz
- Balıkesir: Utku Acun
- Bartın: Fevzi Necati Tözün
- Batman: İsa Parlak
- Bayburt: Teoman Ünüsan
- Bilecik: Gökhan Sözer
- Bingöl: Tamer Ersoy
- Bitlis: Uğur Boran
- Bolu: Nusret Miroğlu
- Burdur: Aykut Pekmez
- Bursa: Ali Fuat Güven
- Çanakkale: Ekrem Özsoy
- Çankırı: Halil İbrahim Daşöz
- Çorum: Zeki Şanal
- Denizli: Alpaslan Karacan
- Diyarbakır: Cemil Serhadlı
- Düzce: Fuat Gürel
- Edirne: Mehmet Canseven
- Elazığ: Lütfullah Bilgin
- Erzincan: Recep Yazıcıoğlu
- Erzurum: Mustafa Malay
- Eskişehir: Ali Fuat Güven
- Gaziantep: Rıza Akdemir
- Giresun: Kahraman Gözükara
- Gümüşhane: Gökhan Sözer
- Hakkari: Nihat Canpolat
- Hatay: Utku Acun
- Iğdır: Şenol Engin
- Isparta: Halil İbrahim Daşöz
- İstanbul: Erol Çakır
- İzmir: Alaaddin Yüksel
- Kahramanmaraş: Hasan Özdemir
- Karabük: Nafiz Kayalı
- Karaman: Ali Akan
- Kars: Hasan Özdemir
- Kastamonu: Enis Yeter
- Kayseri: Nihat Canpolat
- Kırıkkale: Behiç Çelik
- Kırklareli: Murat Yıldırım
- Kırşehir: Mehmet Ali Türker
- Kilis: Teoman Ünüsan
- Kocaeli: Erdoğan Bektaş
- Konya: Ahmet Kayhan
- Kütahya: Aydın Nezih Doğan
- Malatya: Naim Cömertoğlu
- Manisa: Muzaffer Ecemiş
- Mardin: Ergin Nayan
- Mersin: Şenol Engin
- Muğla: Erol Çakır
- Muş: Ali Akan (left office in 2002) / Zeki Şanal (assumed office in 2002)
- Nevşehir: Aykut Ozan
- Niğde: Ünal Özgödek
- Ordu: Utku Acun
- Osmaniye: Ziyaeddin Akbulut
- Rize: Ömer Büyükkent
- Sakarya: Erdinç Büyükakalın
- Samsun: Mehmet Özgün
- Siirt: Atilla Koç
- Sinop: Saim Çotur
- Sivas: Lütfi Fikret Tuncel
- Şanlıurfa: Şahabettin Harput
- Şırnak: Aydın Arslan
- Tekirdağ: Lütfi F. Tuncel
- Tokat: Mehmet Gündoğdu
- Trabzon: Enver Hızlan
- Tunceli: Aslan Yıldırım
- Uşak: Taner Günkut
- Van: Mahmut Yılbaş
- Yalova: Nihat Özgören
- Yozgat: Hüseyin Önal
- Zonguldak: Şehabettin Harput

== Births ==
- 4 February – Erencan Yardımcı, football player

== Deaths ==
- 31 January – Turgut Göle
- 25 March – Esmeray
- 30 August – Hüsnü A. Göksel
- 5 November – Seyfi Öztürk
- 2 December – Mehmet Emin Toprak

== Events ==
- 1 January - A new civil code (adopted in November 2001) came into force. It introduced changes in the areas of gender equality, freedom of association and child protection.
- 3 February - The 2002 Afyon earthquake occurred.
- February, March and August - Introduction of major reform packages in the areas of freedom of expression, individual rights, restrictions on political activity, abolition of the death penalty, and broadcasting in the Kurdish language.
- 3 November - The Justice and Development Party (AKP) wins the general election.
- 18 November - Abdullah Gül becomes prime minister of Turkey.
- 30 November - The state of emergency which had been in force in the Diyarbakır and Şırnak provinces (part of the OHAL region) was lifted.
