= Habib Akdaş =

Habib Akdaş was a Kurdish-Turkish citizen born in Batman. He received training in Al-Qaeda's Afghanistan camps. Upon returning to Turkey, he became the emir of an Al-Qaeda unit responsible for the 2003 Istanbul bombings. Later, he joined Al-Qaeda in Iraq and was killed in an American airstrike on his house.
