= Göksel Kortay =

Turkish actress (born 1939)

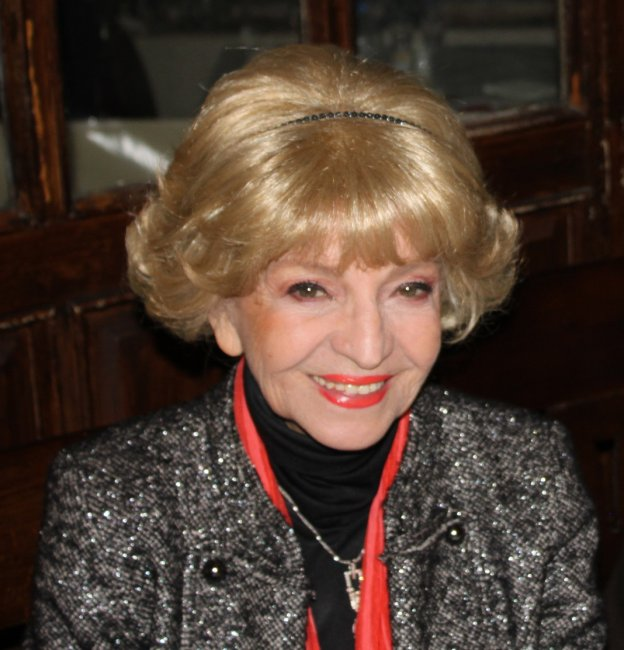
- Born: 6 April 1939 (age 87); Istanbul, Turkey
- Education: University of Michigan
- Occupations: Actress, translator
- Years active: 1962–2005
- Spouse: Kerem Yılmazer (m. 1979; died 2003)

Göksel Kortay (born 6 April 1939) is a Turkish actress, voice actress, translator, and lecturer.

== Biography ==
Göksel Kortay was born in Istanbul on 6 April 1939. After graduating from Robert College, she studied English philology at Istanbul University and graduated in 1960. She was awarded a Fulbright scholarship and went to the US to continue her education. She graduated from Boston University's Department of Theater and Television with a Master’s degree in acting and directing in 1962. She also received a diploma in British Language and Literature from the University of Michigan. She has worked as an actor and director in many professional and semi-professional theaters in Provincetown, New York, San Francisco and Massachusetts. She was the production supervisor of the programs Say When!! and The Tonight Show which were broadcast on the NBC channel.

After returning to Istanbul in 1962, she worked at Kenter Theatre and for Turkish Radio and Television Corporation. She worked at various theaters, including Dormen Theater, Altan Erbulak Metin Serezli Theater, Nisa Şerezli – Tolga Aşkıner Theater, Gönül Ülkü – Gazanfer Özcan Theater. She wrote, directed and voiced children's programs on the radio for 17 years.

In 1978, with the International Istanbul Players theater group, they played Necati Cumalı's "Nalinlar", an English work at The Old Vic theater in London.

Kortay is a lecturer at Müjdat Gezen Art Center. She also taught at Doğuş University and Kadir Has University.

Göksel Kortay has turned over thirty Turkish to foreigners and all of them have been put on stage. Kortay, who has appeared in more than 20 Turkish films and many television series, played in 150 theater plays. For twelve years she was chairman of the Association of Theater Actors (TODER), and was chairman of the Jury of the Afife Jale Theater Awards for five years.

Kortay met Kerem Yılmazer in 1979, and married him; he was killed in the 2003 Istanbul bombings.

== Filmography ==
- Tadımız Kaçmasın – 2005
- Altın Kafes – 2004
- Ömerçip – 2003
- Ruhsar – 1997
- Ay Işığında Saklıdır – 1996
- Yüzleşme – 1996
- Gizli Aşk – 1995
- Mirasyediler – 1995
- Burnumu Keser misiniz? – 1992
- Yıldızlar Gece Büyür – 1991
- Gülüm Benim – 1987
- Şalvar Bank – 1986
- Bebek Davası – 1986
- Gizli Duygular – 1984
- Gençlik Köprüsü – 1975
- Gelinlik Kızlar – 1972

== Dubbing ==
- Dallas – 1978–91 – Barbara Bel Geddes (Miss Ellie Ewing)
- The Little Mermaid – 1989 – Pat Carroll (Ursula)
- Atlantis: The Lost Empire – 2001 – Florence Stanley (Wilhelmina Bertha Packard)
- Monsters, Inc. – 2001 – Bob Peterson (Roz)
