= Cotenna =

City in the Roman province of Pamphylia

Coordinates: 37°02′N 31°38′E

Cotenna or Kotenna (Ancient Greek: Κότεννα) was a city in the Roman province of Pamphylia I in Asia Minor. It corresponds to modern Gödene (Menteşbey), near Antalya/Turkey.

== Name ==
Strabo (Geography, 12.7.1) mentions the Katenneis (Greek: Κατεννεῖς) in Pisidia adjoining Selge and the tribe of Homonades (Ancient Greek: Ὁμοναδεῖς) east and north of Trogitis (Lake Suğla). An inscription has been found showing that the people called themselves Kotenneis, so that the true name of the town was Kotenna/Cotenna. Hierocles mentions it instead as Kotana in Pamphylia. It appears as Kotaina in some Notitiae episcopatuum. It has been said that the Kotenneis are the same as the Etenneis (Greek: Ετεννεῖς), mentioned by Polybius (V, 73) as living in Pisidia above Side, and who struck coins in the Roman times. The native name may have been Hetenneis, and the tribe afterwards divided into at least two districts, the northern taking the name Etenneis, while the southern preferred Kotenneis.

== Bishopric ==
The bishopric of Cotenna was a suffragan of Side, the capital and metropolitan see of Pamphylia Prima. Of its bishops, Hesychius took part in the First Council of Constantinople in 381, Acacius in the Council of Ephesus in 431, Eugenius in the Council of Chalcedon in 451. Maurianus was a signatory of the joint letter that the bishops of the province of Pamphylia sent in 458 to Byzantine Emperor Leo I the Thracian concerning the murder of Proterius of Alexandria. Flavianus was at the synod called by Patriarch Menas of Constantinople in 536. Macarius attended the Photian Council of Constantinople (879).

No longer a residential bishopric, Cotenna is today listed by the Catholic Church as a titular see. Since the Second Vatican Council no new appointments of titular bishops have been made to such Eastern sees, leaving this titular see vacant since the death of the last incumbent in 1986.

There was another see called Etenna. A third district was perhaps also called Banaba or Manaua; for in 680 Cosmas appears as Bishop of "Kotenna and Manaua".
