= Demirbank =

Defunct Turkish bank

Demirbank T.A.Ş.
- Type: Public limited company
- Industry: Financial services
- Founded: Istanbul in 1953; 73 years ago
- Defunct: 2001; 25 years ago
- Fate: Acquired by HSBC Holdings
- Successor: HSBC Bank A.Ş.
- Headquarters: Levent Mh., Büyükdere Cd No:136, 34330 Istanbul, Turkey
- Products: Banking and insurance
- Parent: Cıngıllıoğlu Holding A.Ş.

Demirbank T.A.Ş. is a bank purchased on October 30, 2001, by HSBC from the Turkish Banking Regulator for £248 million. The purchase did not include the non-Turkish subsidiaries of Demirbank, e.g. Demirbank Romania, Demirbank Azerbaijan or Demirbank Bulgaria.

Demirbank was merged with the bank's existing subsidiary in Turkey, HSBC Bank A.Ş. on December 14, 2001, creating a combined business with a balance sheet of £1.4 billion and capital of £170 million. The combined business operates through a multichannel delivery system including the Internet, automated teller machines ("ATMs") and call centers under the HSBC name. It has a network of 168 branches and offices in thirty-eight cities providing a comprehensive range of personal, corporate, treasury, capital markets, stockbroking, fund management and investment banking services across the Turkish market.

== Background ==
The number of banks in Turkey increased rapidly between 1926 and 1929, but these were mostly local banks set up by local businessmen, but an increase in the demand for credit in the post World War II era resulted in some merchants and agricultural exporters setting up banks to increase the availability of credit in the Turkish economy. Most banks in the 1940s were state owned banks, but between 1944 and 1960 there was an increase in the number of private commercial banks.

== Founding ==
Demirbank was founded in 1953 with a startup capital of approximately US$714,000 and 79 shareholders, most of whom were iron and steel merchants from Istanbul's Perşembe Pazarı. Out of the 79 shareholders, 33 were from Istanbul's minority groups.
