= Pera House =

Historic building in Istanbul

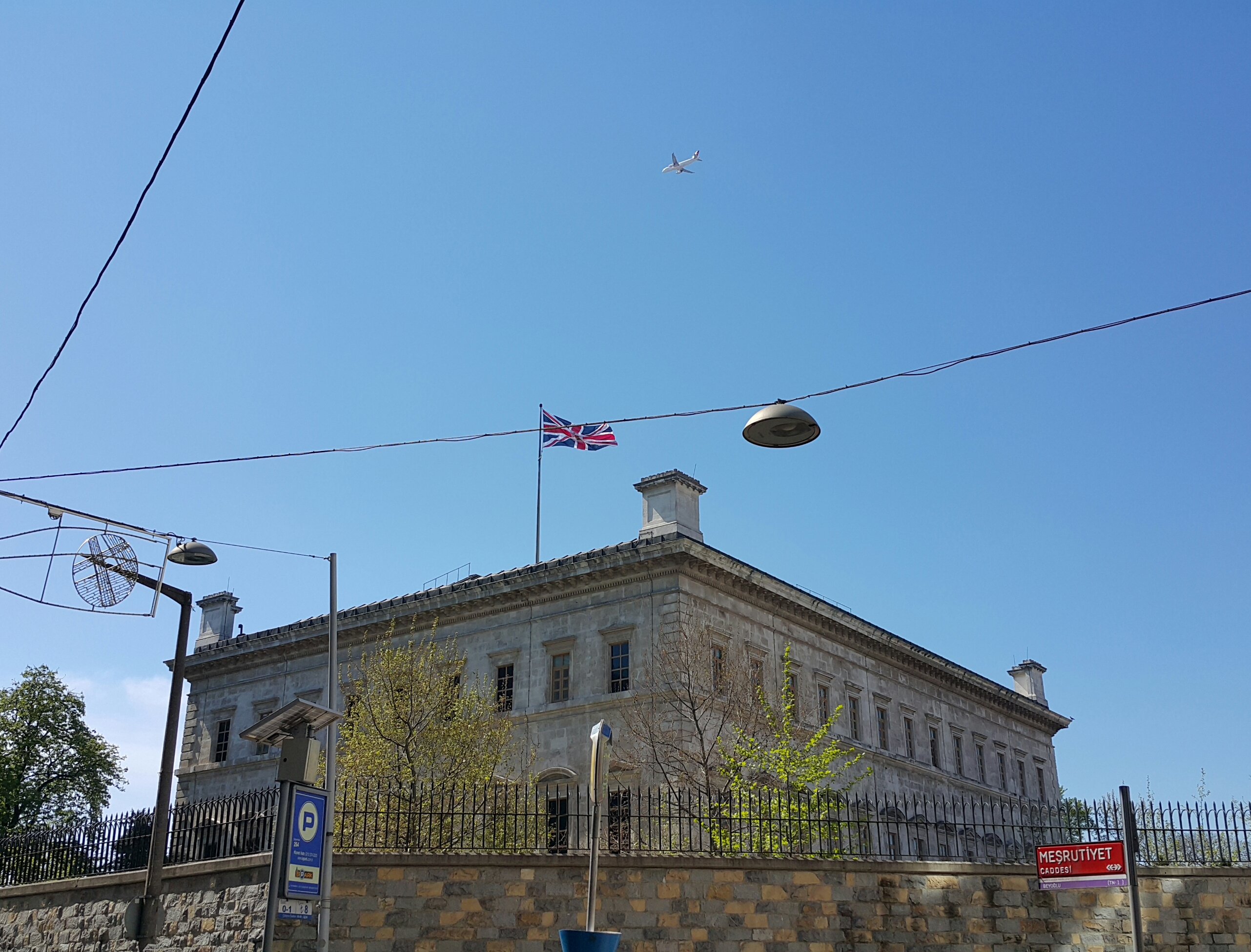
Pera House, photographed in 2015

Pera House is a historic property in the Beyoğlu (formerly Pera) neighborhood of Istanbul, Turkey. Since inauguration in 1856, it has been the seat of diplomatic missions of the United Kingdom to the Ottoman Empire. Following the latter's abolition in 1922 and subsequent relocation of the British embassy to the new capital of Ankara, Pera House has served as the British consulate-general in Istanbul, as well as a residence for the ambassador when in town.

Pera House's predecessor on the same location, erected 1802–1808 at the initiative of Lord Elgin, was the British government's first purpose-built diplomatic building.

== History ==
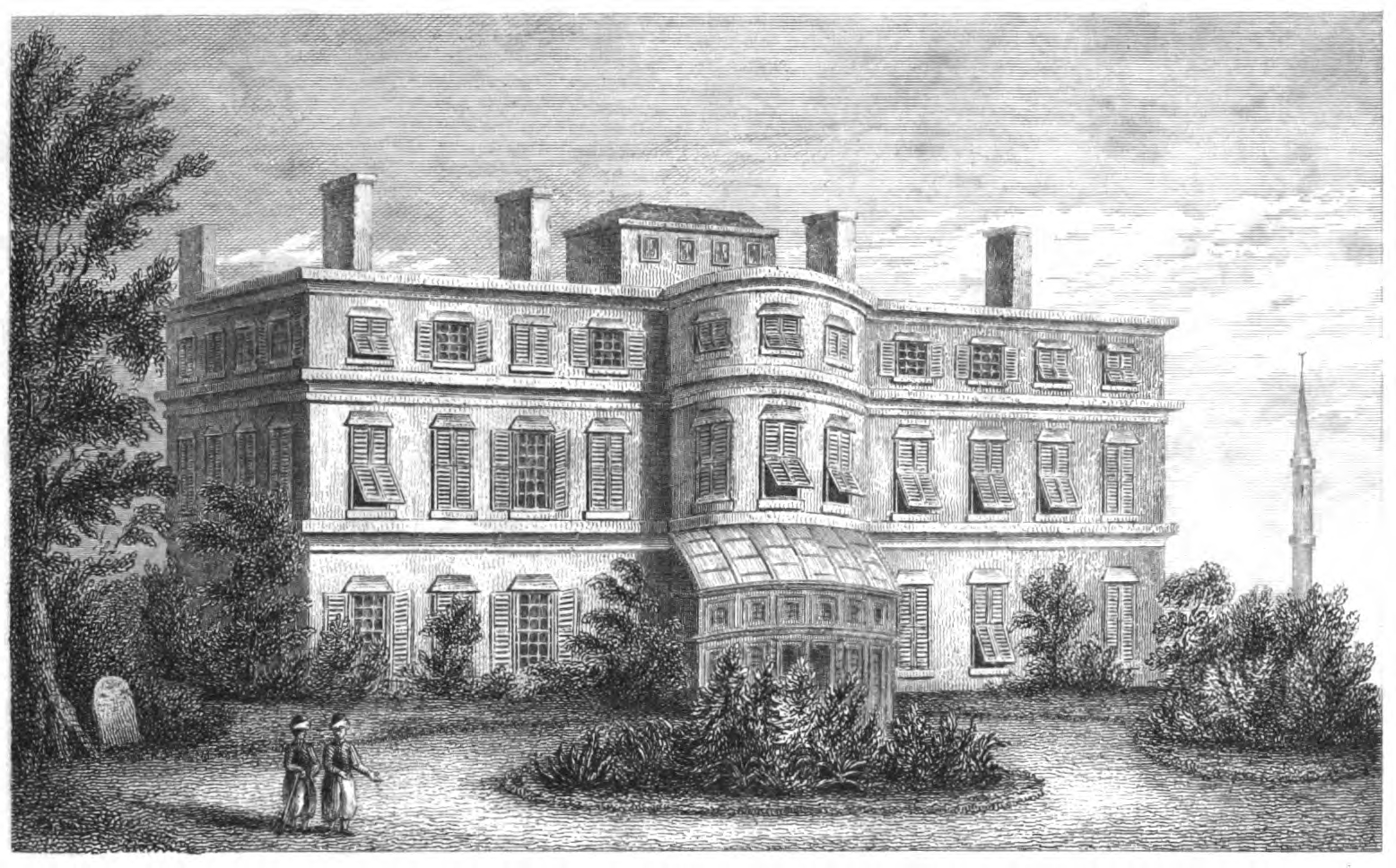
Lord Elgin's building as completed in 1808, depicted in 1836 by Robert Walsh

In the 18th century, British envoys to the Ottoman Empire rented a house from the Levantine Timoni family near the top of the hill in Pera. In 1799, Thomas Bruce, 7th Earl of Elgin arrived as ambassador and decided that the decrepit Timoni house was no longer suitable. Sultan Selim III, with whom relations were excellent in the context of the Napoleonic Wars, bought the Timoni house and granted it to Elgin, then offered him a lump sum of 175,000 piastres (about £11,000) to enlarge the site and to build a brand new mansion on it. For the design, Elgin took inspiration from his own family's Broomhall House and employed Vincenzo Balestra for drawings. By January 1802, the Timoni house was demolished, materials for the new house were collected, and Balestra had largely finalized the design for the new property. The foundation stone was laid on 18 January 1802 with a lavish ceremony, on the occasion of which the Ottoman authorities released over 150 Maltese slaves to British protection. The new building was largely complete, albeit without interior finishings, when Elgin left Constantinople in January 1803, but a combination of factors including a deterioration of Anglo-Ottoman relations resulted in the palace only being completed in 1808.

Elgin's new building was destroyed by fire on 2 August 1831, simultaneously as the Palais de France down the hill. John Ponsonby arrived in Constantinople as ambassador in 1832 and chose to live on the Bosporus at Tarabya, in a summer yalı that the sultan had made available to the embassy in 1829. In 1834, the Treasury and Foreign Secretary Lord Palmerston dispatched to Constantinople military engineer Harry Jones to examine various options and make plans correspondingly. He suggested either rebuilding on the Pera site or adopting a permanent location at Tarabya; the British government opted for the former option, and sent Jones back to Constantinople at the end of 1834 to develop his plans further, but his new estimate was viewed by the Treasury as too high and he was recalled.

Things were left undecided until Palmerston decided to revive the project in June 1841, at a time of diplomatic crisis with the Ottoman government. The commissioners selected William James Smith, assistant surveyor for the Crown Estate in London, who arrived in Constantinople later in 1841 and rented two adjacent stone houses in Galata, the old commercial neighborhood below Pera, to serve as embassy until the rebuilding at Pera was complete. Smith returned to London in late 1842 and further developed his designs, which were reviewed by Charles Barry as consultant to the Office of Works. It is likely that Barry suggested changes informed by his recently completed Reform Club building on Pall Mall, London. The new foreign secretary, the Earl of Aberdeen, approved Smith's design in April 1843. Smith returned to Constantinople in July 1843 and, after some delay, took possession of the Pera site on 21 August 1844. Construction was marred by delays and unexpected cost increases. Ambassador Stratford Canning eventually moved into the unfinished building in October 1848, and other staff joined in late 1849. Smith left Constantinople in May 1853, and the new building was fully completed in 1855. An inaugural ball was held on 31 January 1856, with Abdülmecid I as guest of honor.

Pera House was again damage by fire in June 1870, leaving the building completely gutted with nothing remaining inside except bare walls and damaged stone staircases above the ground floor, which was largely intact. The house was restored, made fireproof, and the surrounding unbuilt land was widened to decrease fire risk; the repair work was only completed in 1876. The building was wired for electric lighting in about 1910.

The embassy moved to Ankara in the late 1920s. In the 1930s, the consulate-general moved into Pera House from its buildings in Galata, which were subsequently sold. An automatic telephone exchange was installed during the Second World War, and a heating system shortly after it. The embassy returned to Istanbul for a few months in the summer of 1945 while works were being done to both the main buildings at Ankara. Plans were made to sell the large property, in 1919-1922 and again in 1947, but not implemented.

In May 2000, Pera House was once severely affected by fire, and in November 2003 the building, still undergoing repairs, was damaged by a car bomb just outside the gateway, part of a wider scheme of attacks. Consul-General Roger Short was killed instantly, and nine staff members also died. The building was formally re-opened by Charles, Prince of Wales on 24 October 2004.

== Chapel of Saint Helena ==
Like other diplomatic legations in Constantinople, the British embassy, and before it that of England, has hosted a place of Christian worship on its grounds under a local chaplaincy founded in 1582. The Chapel of Saint Helena was established on the grounds of Pera House and rebuilt following fire in 1847.

Following the Crimean War, the Anglican Church erected the Crimea Memorial Church on a plot nearby donated by Abdülmecid I which had previously been a Greek Orthodox cemetery. That much larger church superseded Saint Helena's chapel as main place of Anglican worship in Istanbul, but the situation was reversed in the 1970s as the Anglican congregation had become too small for the Memorial Church, and services returned to the chapel on the Pera House grounds. The chapel was damaged by the car bomb in 2003.

== See also ==
- List of diplomats of the United Kingdom to the Ottoman Empire
- List of diplomatic missions of the United Kingdom
