= 2000 in Turkey =

- Centuries: 20th; 21st
- Decades: 1980s; 1990s; 2000s; 2010s; 2020s
- See also: List of years in Turkey

Events in the year 2000 in Turkey.

== Incumbents ==
- President: Süleyman Demirel (until 16 May), Ahmet Necdet Sezer (starting 16 May)
- Prime Minister: Bülent Ecevit

== Establishments ==
- 1 February - The Abdi İpekçi Peace Monument is inaugurated.

== Deaths ==
- 15 April – Hayati Hamzaoğlu
- 3 July – Kemal Sunal
- 25 October – Nejat Saydam
