= 1996 in Turkey =

- Centuries: 20th; 21st
- Decades: 1970s; 1980s; 1990s; 2000s; 2010s
- See also: List of years in Turkey

Events in the year 1996 in Turkey.

== Parliament ==
- 20th Parliament of Turkey

== Incumbents ==
- President – Süleyman Demirel
- Prime Minister –

Tansu Çiller (up to 6 March)
Mesut Yılmaz (6 March-28 June)
Necmettin Erbakan (from 28 June)

- Leader of the opposition –

Mesut Yılmaz (up to 6 March)
Necmettin Erbakan (6 March-28 March)
Mesut Yılmaz (from 28 June)

== Ruling party and the main opposition ==
- Ruling party

True Path Party (DYP)
Motherland Party (ANAP)
Welfare Party (RP)

- Main opposition

Motherland Party (ANAP) (from 6 March)
Welfare Party (RP) (6 March-28 June)
Motherland Party (ANAP) (from 28 June)

== Cabinet ==
- 52nd government of Turkey (up to 6 March)
- 53rd government of Turkey (6 March −28 June)
- 54th government of Turkey (from 28 June)

== Events ==
- 16 January – The Panamanian ferry MV Avrasya was hijacked by pro-Chechen separatists
- 29 January – Beginning of Kardak crises between Turkey and Greece
- 8 February – BirgenAir accident 189 deaths
- 6 March – A coalition government (ANAP and DYP)
- 4 April – Novelist Yaşar Kemal was awarded (Prix Méditerranée Étranger)
- 21 May – Fenerbahçe won the championship of the Turkish football league
- 24 May – After corruption accuses Tansu Çiller the chairman of DYP announced that DYP will end the coalition’
- 2 June – By local elections
- June 3/14 – Habitat II (conference)
- 14 June – Operation against militants
- 28 June – New coalition government (RP and DYP)
- 10 July – Türksat 1C satellite
- 17 July – According to Fortune, Koç Holding was one of the 500 greatest companies of the World
- October 2/8 – Prime minister Erbakan's African tour. His visit to Libya caused sharp reactions
- 24 October – Osmaniye Province was established
- 3 November – Susurluk car crash
- 10 November – NTV Turkey launched.
- 25 November – Mesut Yılmaz was wounded in Budapest, Hungary. This event was probably connected to Susurluk scandal

== Births ==
- 2 January – Sıla Saygı, female ice skater
- 6 February – Emel Dereli, female track and field athlete competing in shot put
- 15 April – İpek Soylu, female tennis player
- 27 August – Ebru Topçu, female footballer

== Deaths ==
- 9 January – Özdemir Sabancı (born in 1941), industrialist (assassinated)
- 28 January – Müfide İlhan, first female city mayor
- 19 January – Kasım Gülek (born in 1905), politician
- 25 February – Vehbi Koç (born in 1901), industrialist
- 23 May – Tanju Okan (born in 1938), singer
- 21 June – Suphi Baykam (born 1926), physician and politician
- 28 July – Ömer Lütfü Topal (born in 1942), casino owner
- 29 August – Aliye Rona (born in 1921), actress
- 24 September – Zeki Müren (born in 1931), singer
- 3 November – Abdullah Çatlı (born in 1956), agent

== Gallery ==
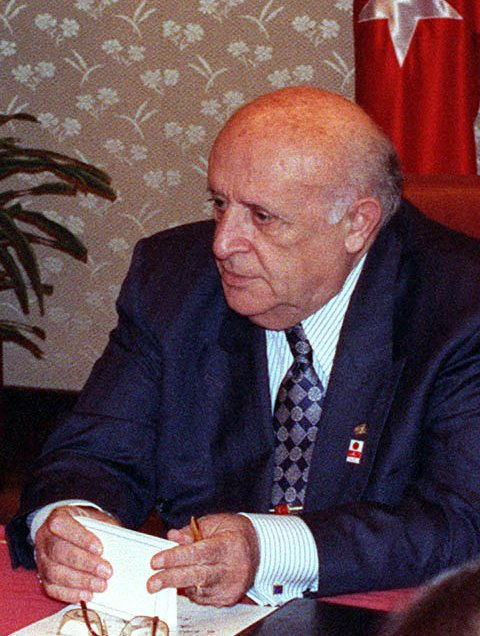
Süleyman Demirel

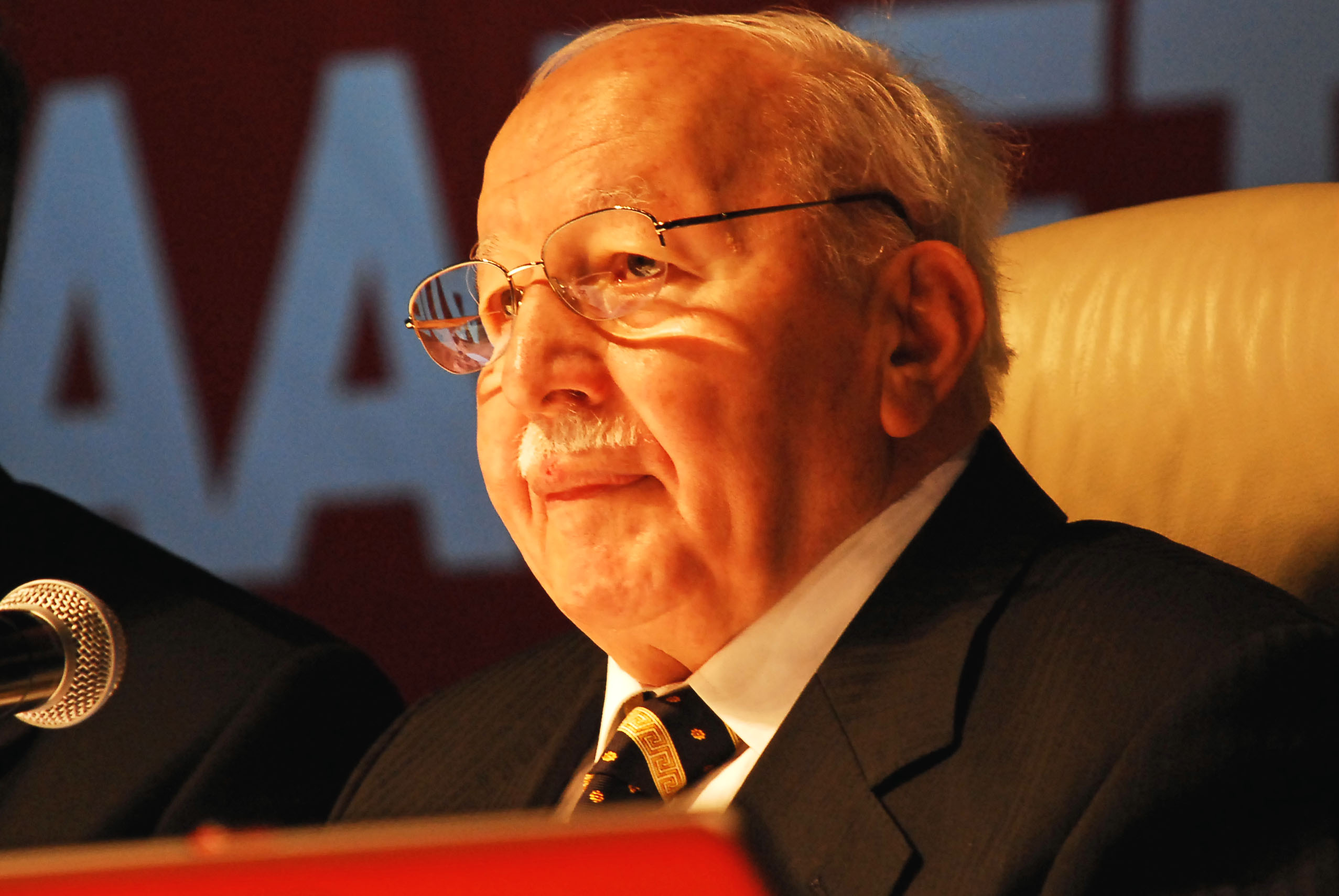
Necmettin Erbakan

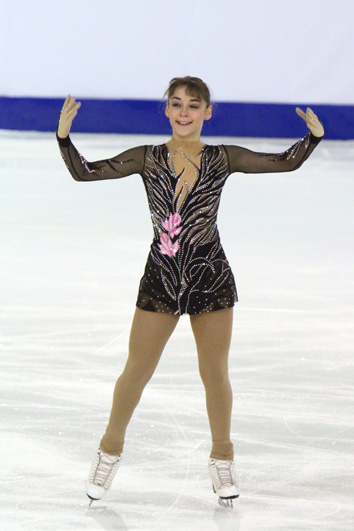
Sıla Saygı

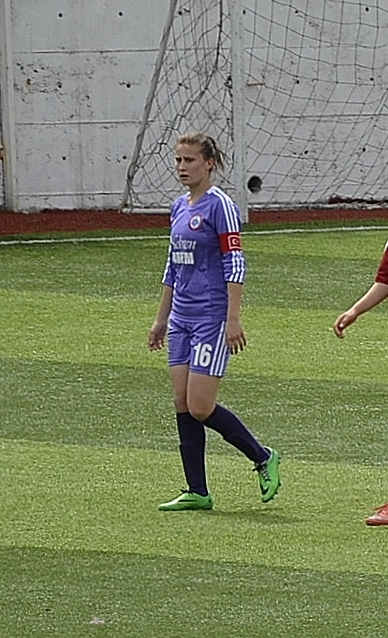
Ebru Topçu

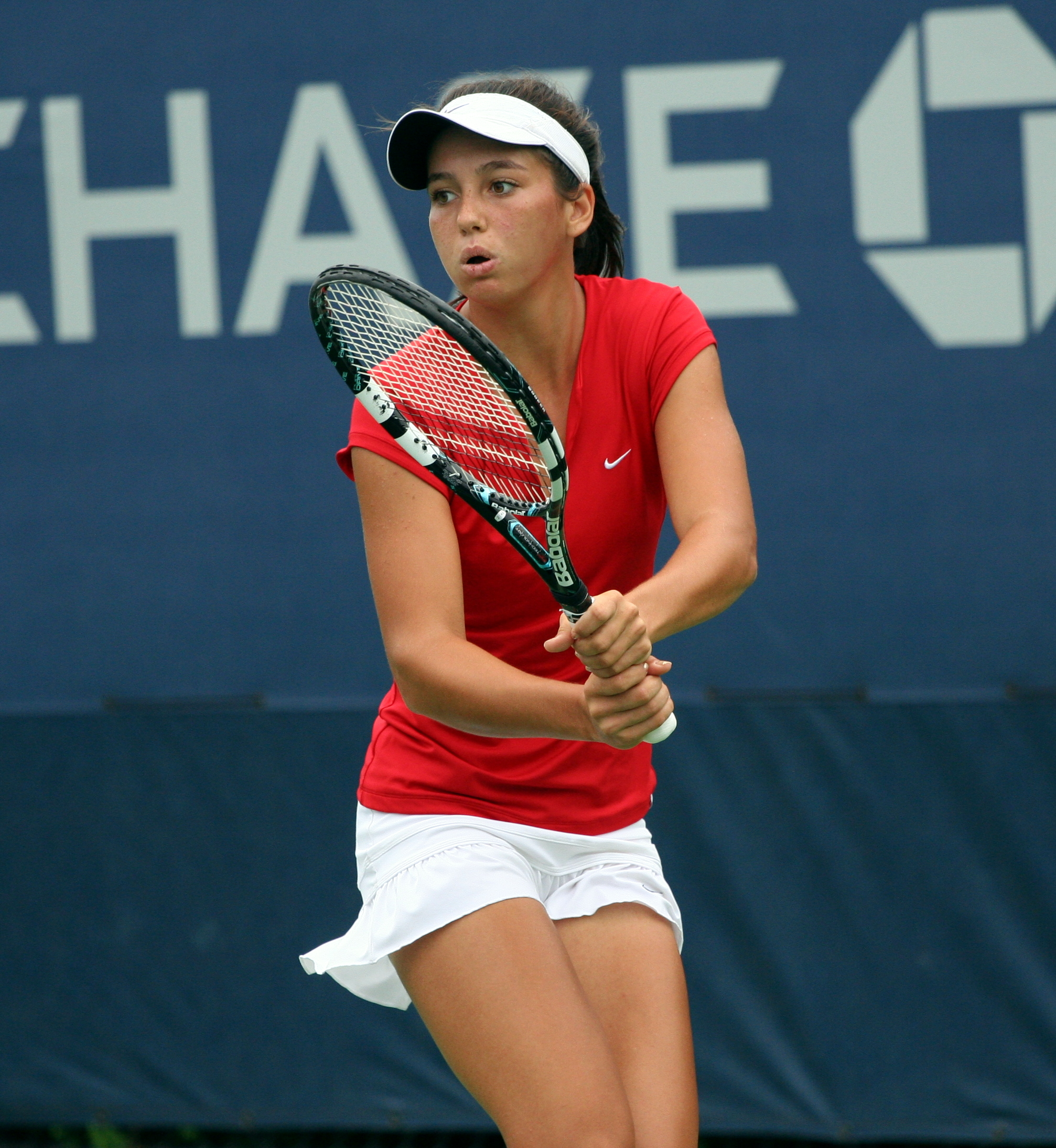
İpek Soylu

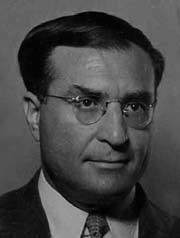
Kasım Gülek

== See also ==
- Turkey at the 1996 Summer Olympics
- 1995-96 1.Lig
- Turkey in the Eurovision Song Contest 1996
