= 1999 in Turkey =

- Centuries: 20th; 21st
- Decades: 1970s; 1980s; 1990s; 2000s; 2010s
- See also: List of years in Turkey

Events in the year 1999 in Turkey

== Parliament ==
- 20th Parliament of Turkey (up to 18 April)
- 21st Parliament of Turkey

== Incumbents ==
- President – Süleyman Demirel
- Prime Minister –

Mesut Yılmaz (up to 11 January)
Bülent Ecevit (from 11 January)

- Leader of the opposition

Recai Kutan

== Ruling party and the main opposition ==
- Ruling party

Motherland Party (ANAP) with coalition partners Democratic Left Party (DSP) and Democrat Turkey Party (DTP) (up to 11 January)
Democratic Left Party (DSP) (11 January-28 May)
Democratic Left Party (DSP) with coalition partners Motherland Party (ANAP) and Nationalist Movement Party (MHP) (from 28 May)

- Main opposition

Virtue Party (FP)

== Cabinet ==
- 55th government of Turkey (up to 11 January)
- 56th government of Turkey (11 January-28 May)
- 57th government of Turkey (from 28 May)

== Events ==
- 11 January – Bülent Ecevit formed a minority government
- 15–16 February – Abdullah Öcalan, was arrested in Kenya
- 18 April – The General election (DSP 136 seats, MHP 129 seats, FP 11 seats, ANAP 86 seats, True Path Party (DYP) 85 seats. The oldest and most established party, the Republican People's Party (CHP), wasn’t able to receive the 10% necessary to enter parliament.)
- 22 April – CHP president Deniz Baykal resigned
- 23 April – Altan Öymen was elected as the new president of CHP
- 2 May – Merve Kavakçı was protested in the parliament
- 30 May – Galatasaray won the championship of the Turkish football league
- 31 May – Abdullah Öcalan’s trial
- 17 August – The 7.6 M_{w} İzmit earthquake shook northwestern Turkey with a maximum Mercalli intensity of IX (Violent), leaving 17,118–17,127 dead and 43,953–50,000 injured.
- 12 November – The 7.2 M_{w} Düzce earthquake shook northwestern Turkey with a maximum Mercalli intensity of IX (Violent), leaving 845–894 dead and 4,948 injured.
- 11 December – During the European Union summit in Helsinki, Turkey’s future membership was approved

== Deaths ==
- 11 January – Öztürk Serengil (born in 1930), actor
- 1 February – Barış Manço (born in 1943), singer
- 16 February – Necil Kazım Akses (born in 1908), composer
- 18 May – Hayrettin Erkmen (born in 1915), politician
- 20 June – Konca Kuriş (born in 1960), feminist writer (assassinated)
- 10 July – Ahmet Taner Kışlalı (born in 1939), political scientist (assassinated)
- 1 August – Paris Pişmiş (born in 1911), astronomer
- 3 October – Mübeccel Göktuna (born in 1915) – founder of Women's Party

== Gallery ==
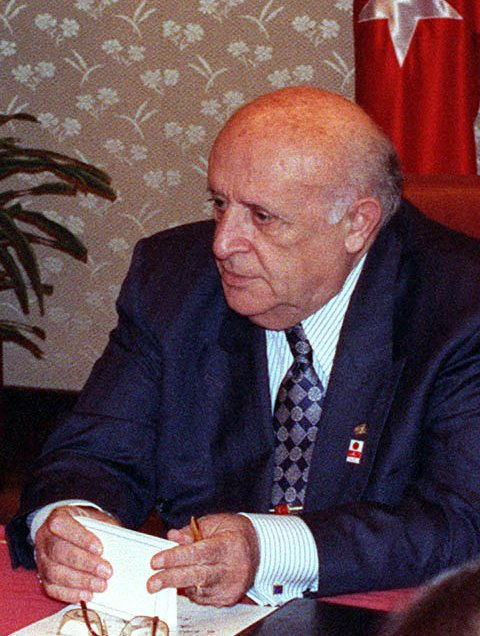
Süleyman Demirel

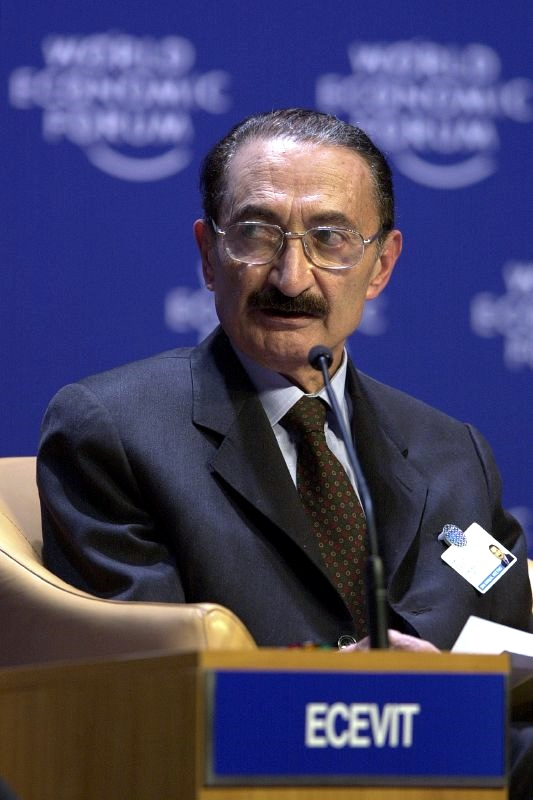
Bülent Ecevit

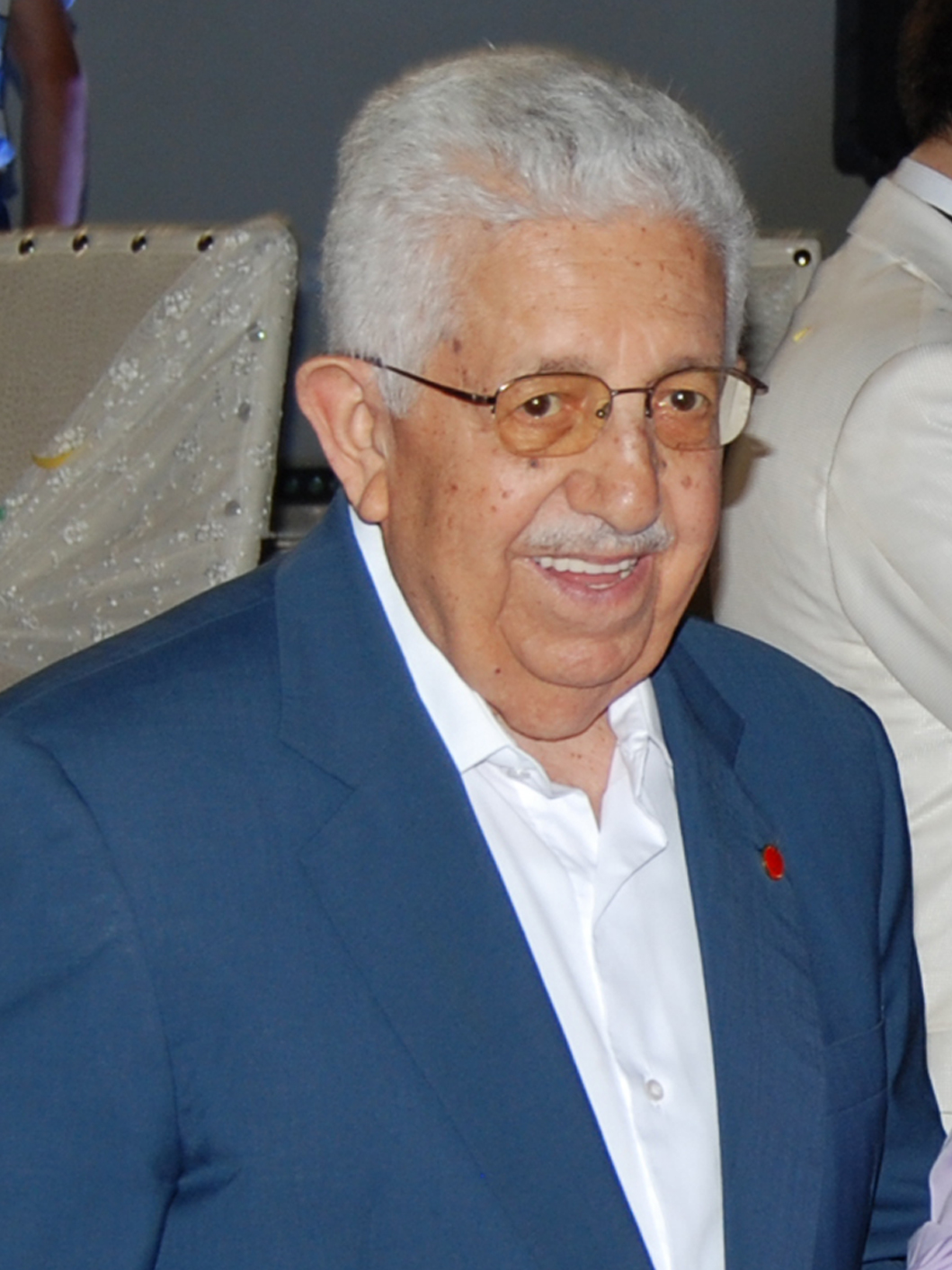
Recai Kutan

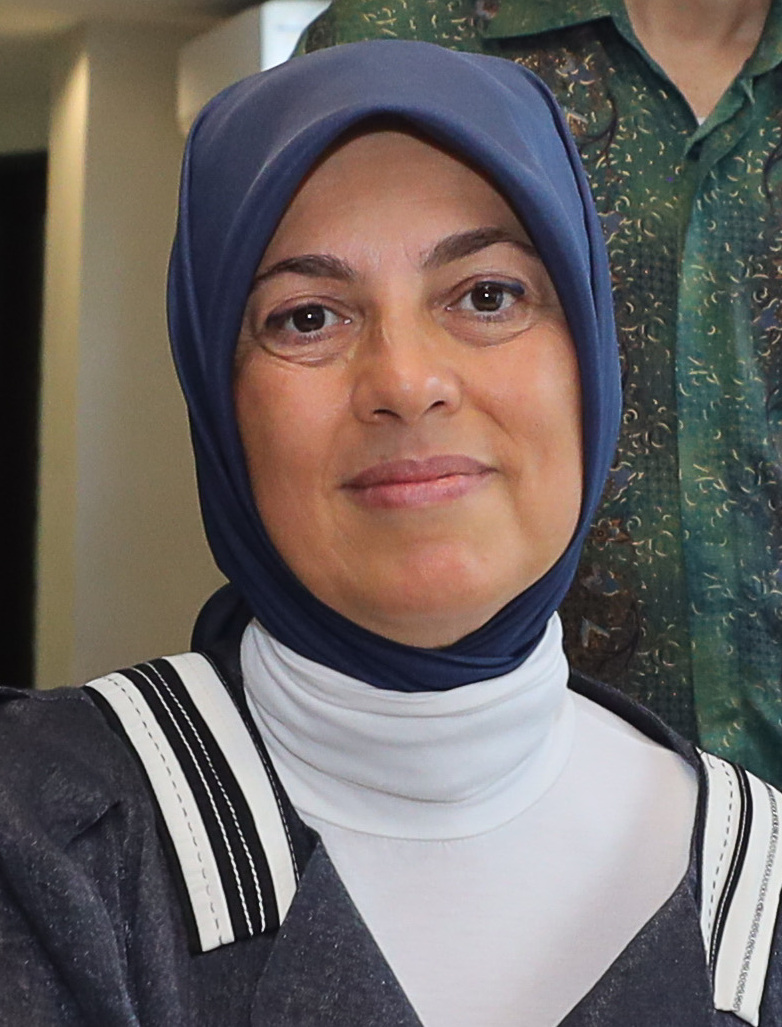
Merve Kavakçı

== See also ==
- 1998-99 1.Lig
- Turkey in the Eurovision Song Contest 1999
