= 1997 in Turkey =

- Centuries: 20th; 21st
- Decades: 1970s; 1980s; 1990s; 2000s; 2010s
- See also: List of years in Turkey

Events in the year 1997 in Turkey.

== Parliament ==
- 20th Parliament of Turkey

== Incumbents ==
- President – Süleyman Demirel
- Prime Minister –

Necmettin Erbakan (up to 30 June)
Mesut Yılmaz (from 30 June)

- Leader of the opposition –

Mesut Yılmaz (up to 30 June)
Necmettin Erbakan (from 30 June)

== Ruling party and the main opposition ==
- Ruling party

Welfare Party (RP) with coalition partner True Path Party (DYP)
Motherland Party (ANAP) with coalition partners Democratic Left Party (DSP) and Democrat Turkey Party (DTP)

- Main opposition

Motherland Party (ANAP) (up to 30 June)
Welfare Party (RP) (from 30 June)

== Cabinet ==
- 54th government of Turkey (up to 30 June)
- 55th government of Turkey (from 30 June)

== Events ==
- 8 January – Democrat Turkey Party was founded by Hüsamettin Cindoruk.
- 11 January – Prime minister Necmettin Erbakan invited religious order leaders to his Office. This invitation caused political unrest
- 24 January – Sabotage to Kirkuk–Ceyhan Oil Pipeline
- 2 February – Beginning of a civil disobedience action 1 minute darkness for a continuous light by turning off the lights every night for 1 minute
- 28 February – In a meeting of National Security Council the military members of the council asked for a secular administration (This event later on was ironically called post modern coup)
- 23 April – On children’s day, Tansu Çiller, the vice prime minister, announced that the compulsory education was raised from 5 years to 8 years
- 15 May – Turkey enters northern Iraq with the stated aim of "supporting KDP actions against the PKK."
- 16 May – Yaşar Kemal won Peace Prize of the German Book Trade
- 22 May – Four male and six female Turkish weightlifters won the gold medal in 1997 European Weightlifting Championships
- 25 May – Galatasaray won the championship of the Turkish football league
- 21 June – Upon Necmettin Erbakan’s resignation, the president appointed Mesut Yılmaz to form the new government.
- 25 October – Bus accident in Konya Province 49 deaths
- 14 December – At the Luxembourg summit, the European Union decided to continue negotiations with Turkey

== Deaths ==
- 4 April – Alparslan Türkeş (born 1917), politician
- 4 May – Esin Engin (born 1945), musician
- 20 June – Cahit Külebi (born 1917), poet
- 2 July – Ayhan Songar (born 1926), academic and psychiatrist
- 26 August – Füreya Koral (born 1910), ceramist
- 26 December – Cahit Arf (born 1910), mathematician

== Gallery ==
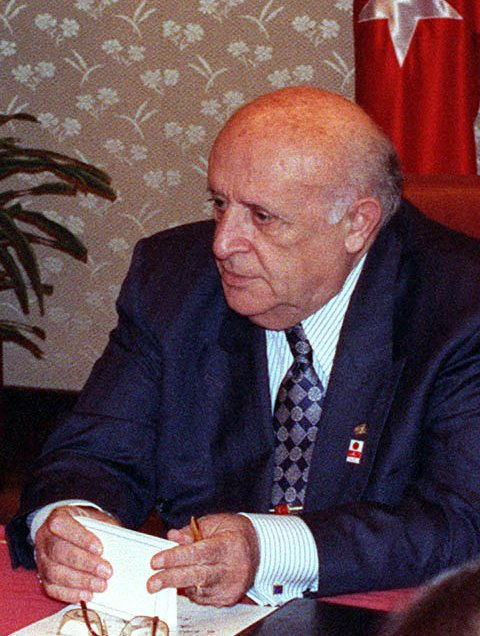
Süleyman Demirel

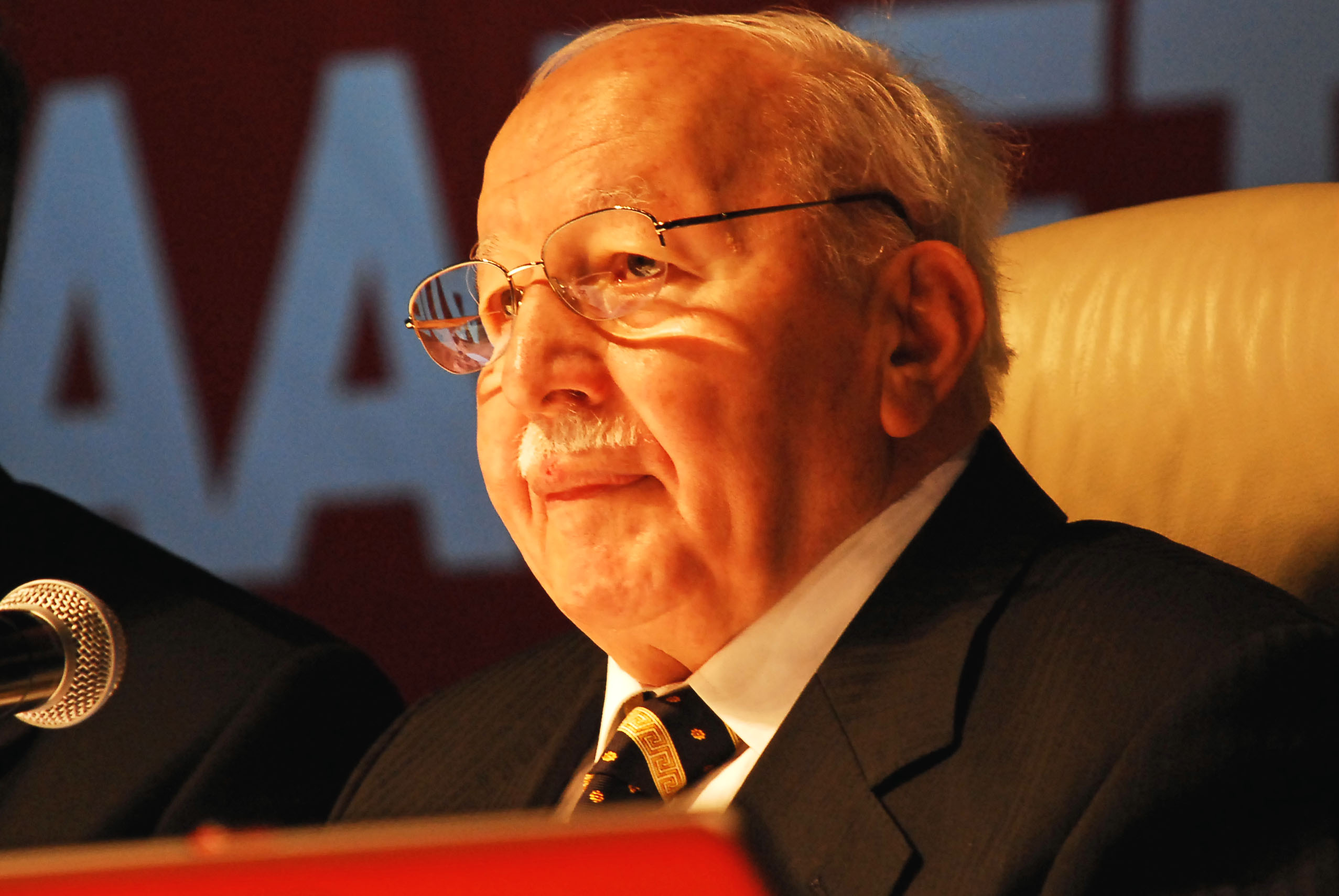
Necmettin Erbakan

== See also ==
- 1996-97 1.Lig
- Turkey in the Eurovision Song Contest 1997
