= Crimea Memorial Church =

Coordinates: 41.0277°N 28.9771°E

Crimean Memorial Church, Istanbul
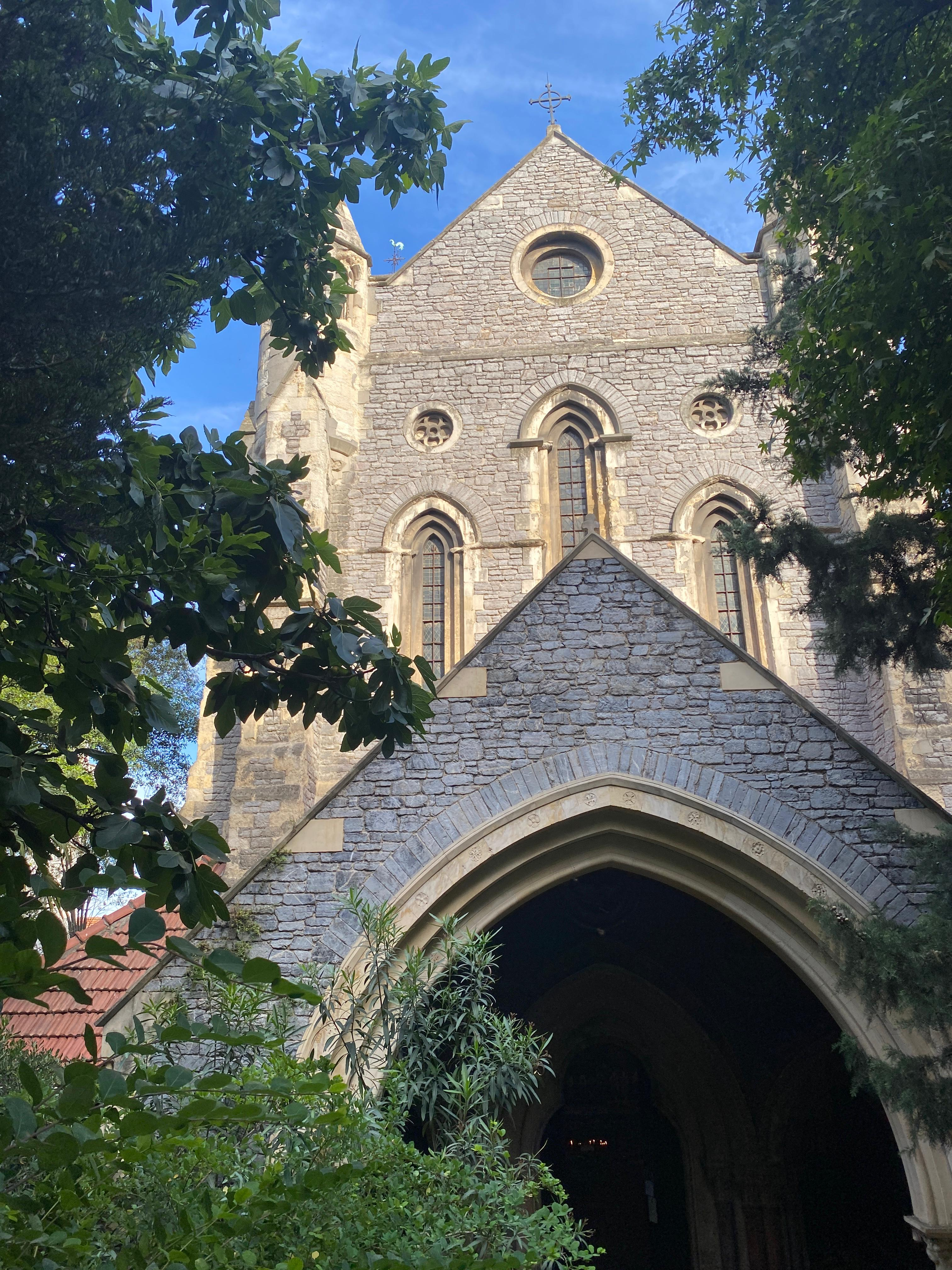
- Crimean Memorial Church, Istanbul
- Location: Serdar-ı Ekrem Sokak, Beyoğlu, İstanbul
- Country: Turkey
- Denomination: Church of England
- Churchmanship: Anglo-Catholic

History
- Dedication: Christ Church
- Consecrated: 1868

Architecture
- Functional status: Active
- Architect: George Edmund Street
- Architectural type: Church
- Style: Gothic Revival

Administration
- Diocese: Diocese of Gibraltar in Europe
- Archdeaconry: Eastern Archdeaconry

The Crimea Memorial Church, officially known as Christ Church, Galata, is a Church of England church in the Beyoglu - Taksim district of Istanbul, Turkey.

== History ==
The current church was built on land donated by Sultan Abdulmecid and was constructed between 1858 and 1868 in memory of British soldiers who had died in the Crimean War.

The idea of building a memorial church in Istanbul was first raised in 1856 and a competition held. Designs were submitted by the architect William Burges and he was declared the winner. However, in-fighting on the approval committee, coupled with concerns regarding the supposed "un-English" style of Burges' design, led to his being removed as architect in 1863 and his replacement by George Edmund Street. The church was then constructed in Victorian Gothic style between 1864 and 1868.

Lack of a congregation led to the closure of the church in 1978. Much of the work to restore the building was carried out by a group of Sri Lankan refugees who fled to Istanbul at the time of the Iraqi invasion of Kuwait. The church re-opened in September 1991.

The organ was made in England in 1911 by W. Hill & Son, who also built organs for York Minster, Ely, Worcester, and Manchester cathedrals. The wrought iron staircase was also brought from London. The organ loft houses regimental flags from the Crimean war, two from British military HQ in occupied Istanbul after the First World War and the ensign flag from the battleship that took Mehmed VI, the last sultan, into exile. Its facade is decorated with colourful modern takes on Biblical stories by the artist, Erica Beard.

== Art and memorials ==
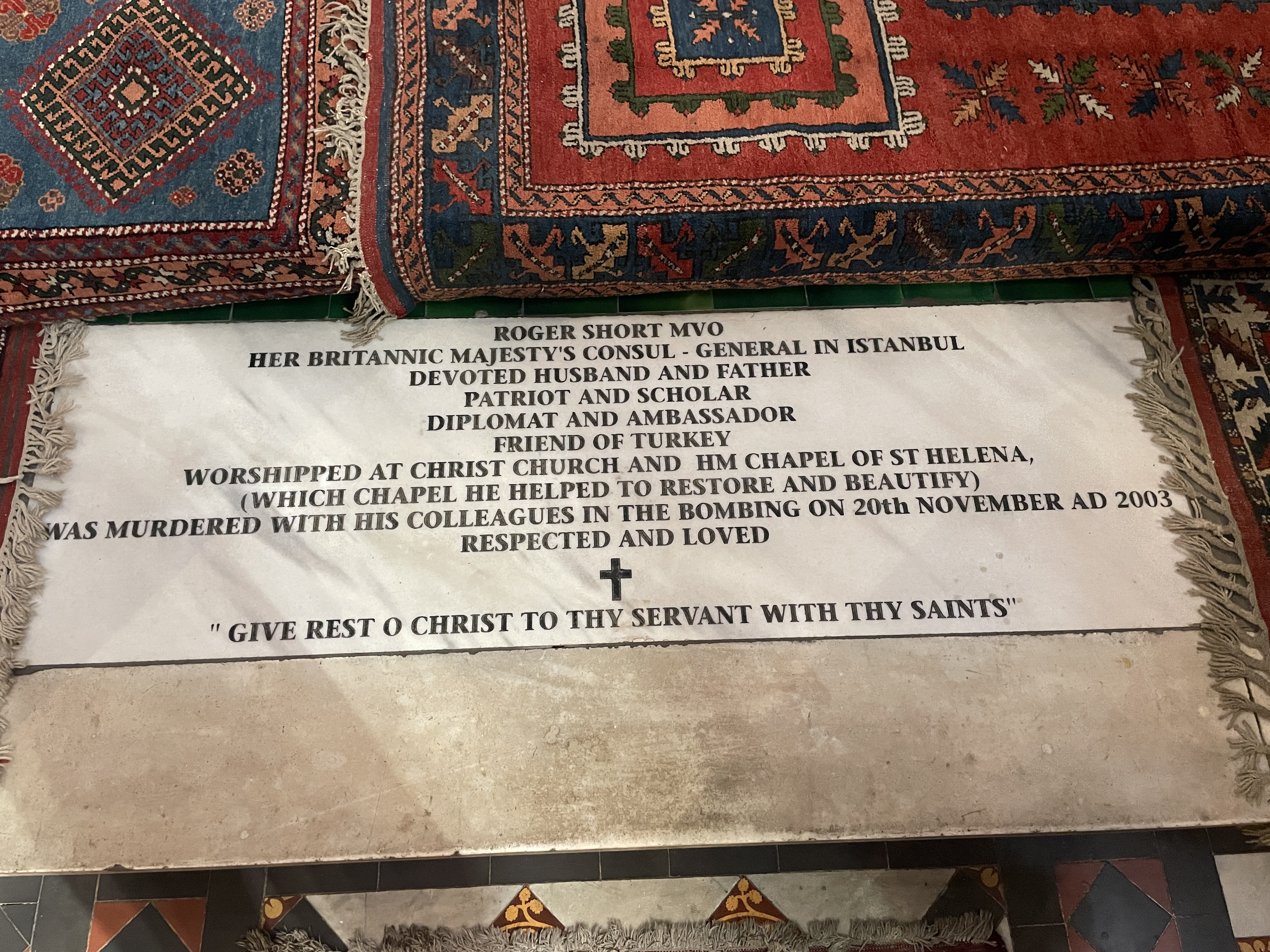
Memorial to Roger Short in Christ Church, Istanbul.

The wooden rood screen was erected in 1923 in memory of those who died at Gallipoli. Between 1995 and 2005 the Scottish artist Mungo McCosh adorned it with images of saints and others set against a backdrop of the İstanbul skyline. Figures associated with the congregation provided the models for the saints' faces. In another Turkish twist, the Christ child is shown holding a simit.

The chancel contains a memorial to Roger Short, the British Consul-General killed by a bomb that destroyed the original entrance to the British Consulate on 30 November 2003.

== Work of the Church ==
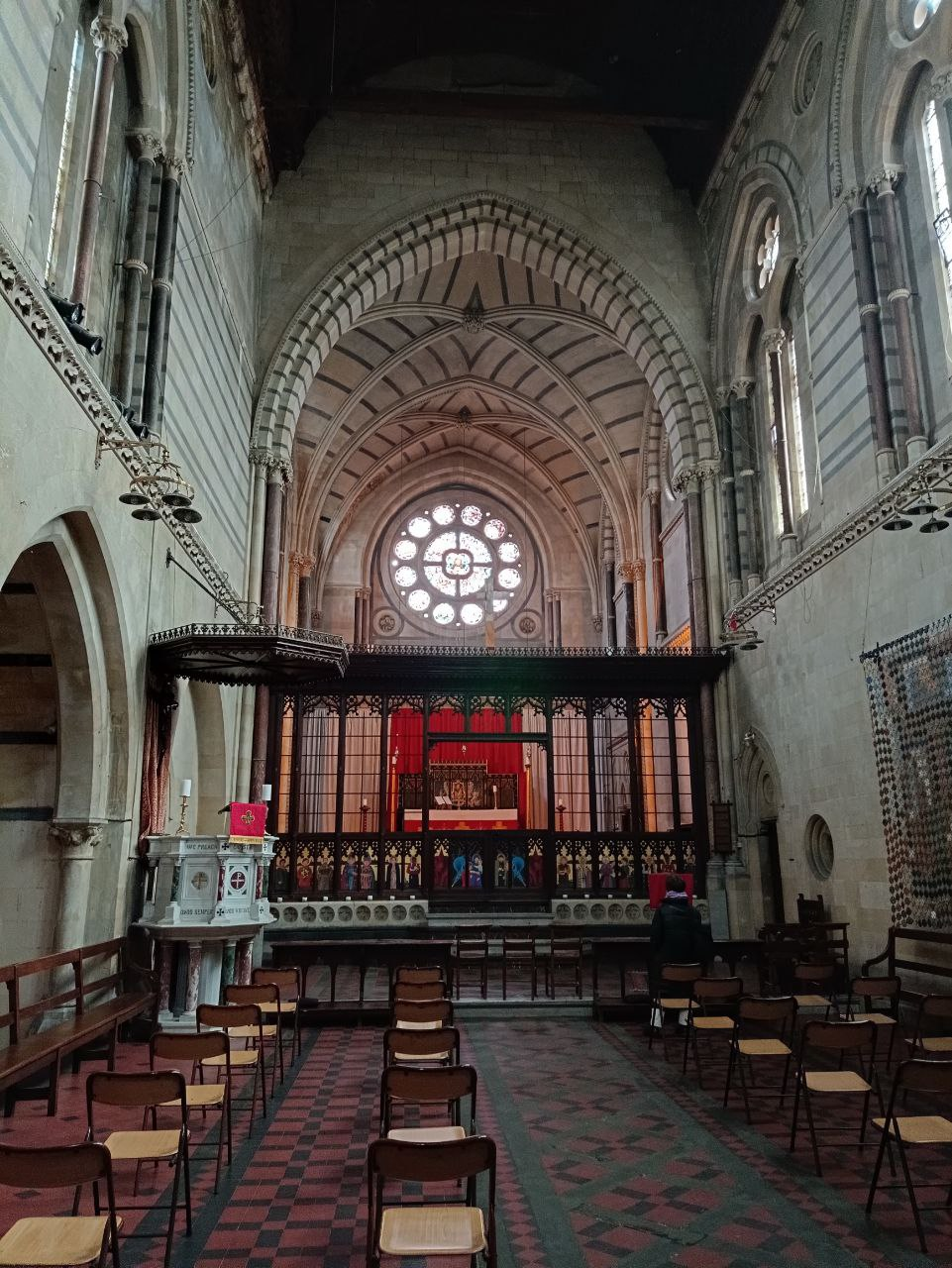
Inside the Church, 2023

The main Sunday liturgy is celebrated in the church every week at 11 a.m., and attendance is open to all. There is a resident priest who serves the three Anglican churches in Istanbul, namely Christ Church (Galata), All Saints (Moda), and St Helena (at the British Consulate).

Since the church was reopened, the crypt has served as St George's Hostel, the focus of the church's charitable work to help refugees and migrants who find themselves in Istanbul. The church has housed over 2000 homeless people in recent years and continues to provide assistance to displaced people, notably Christians who have fled Pakistan.

== Gallery ==
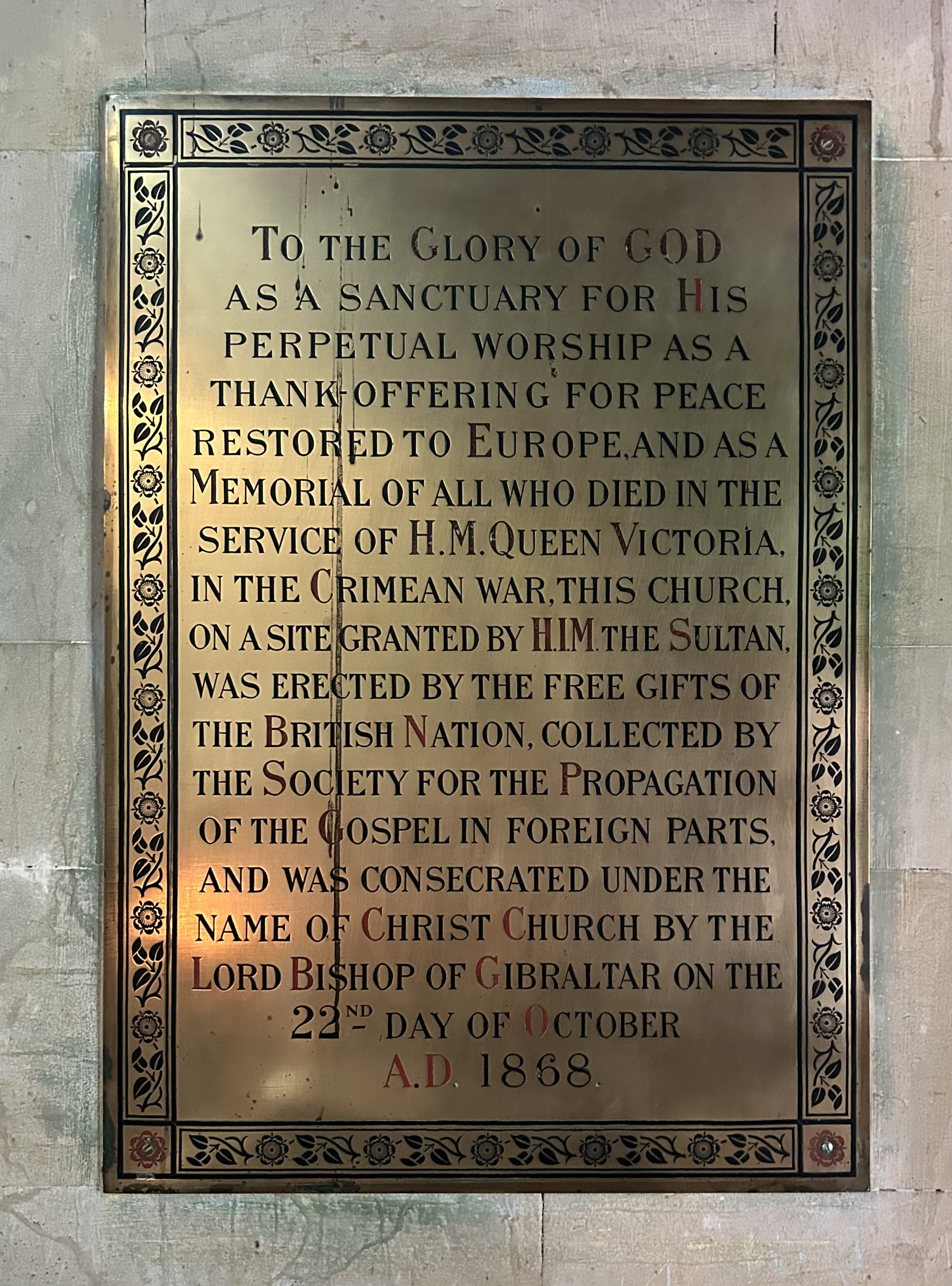
Memorial tablet to consecration of Crimea Memorial Church

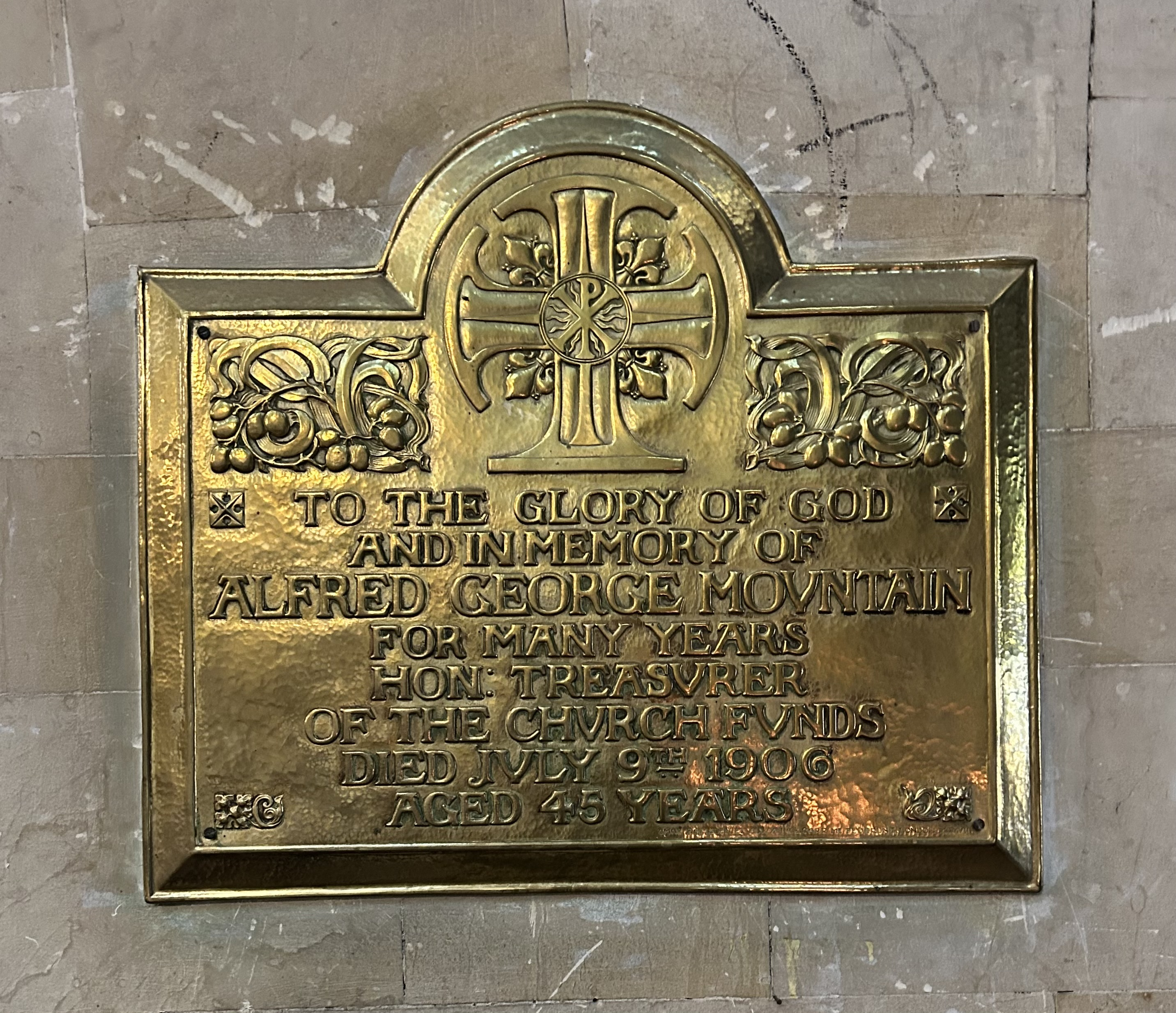
Memorial tablet to Alfred George Mountain

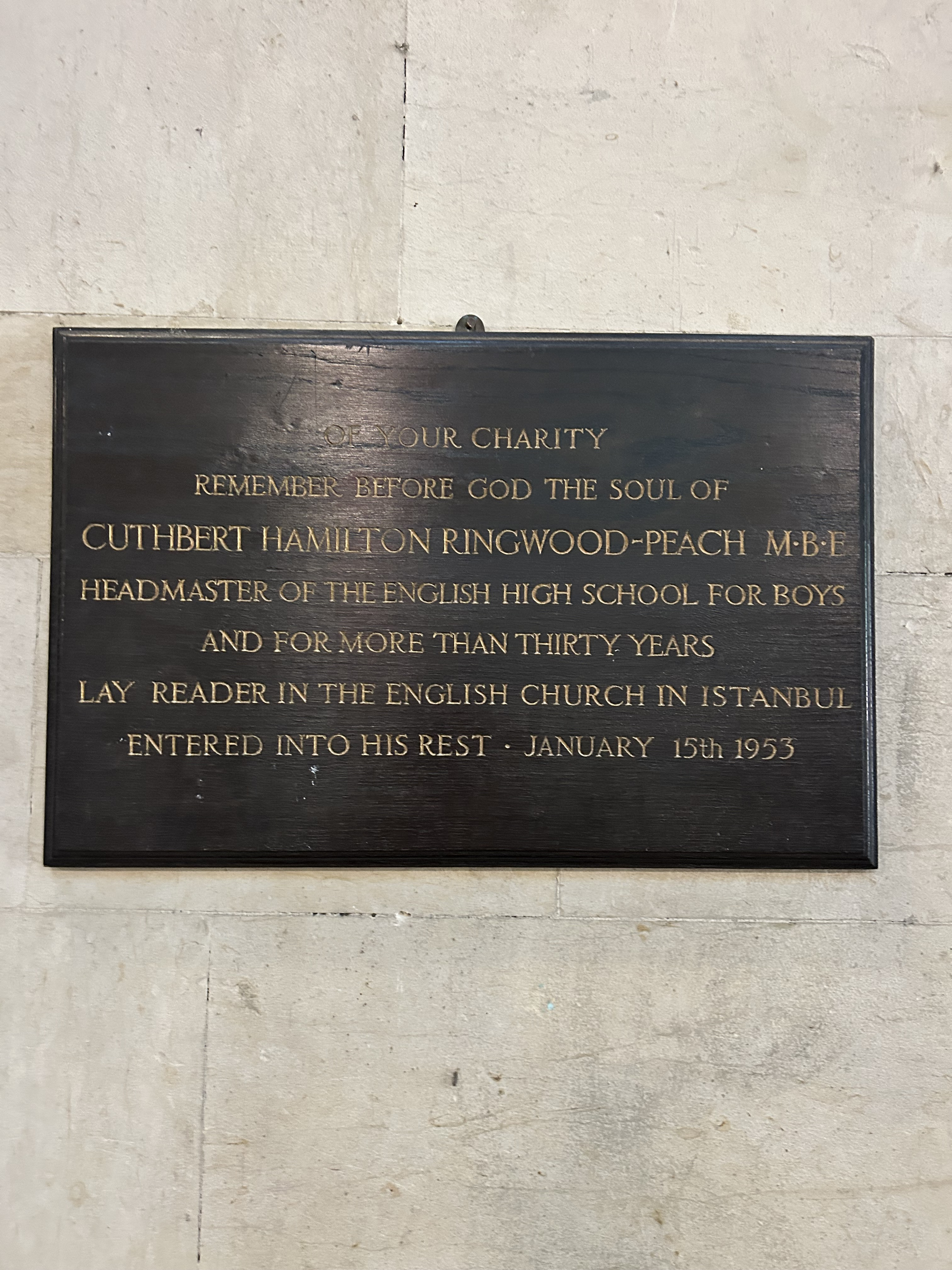
Memorial tablet to Cuthbert Hamilton Ringwood-Peach

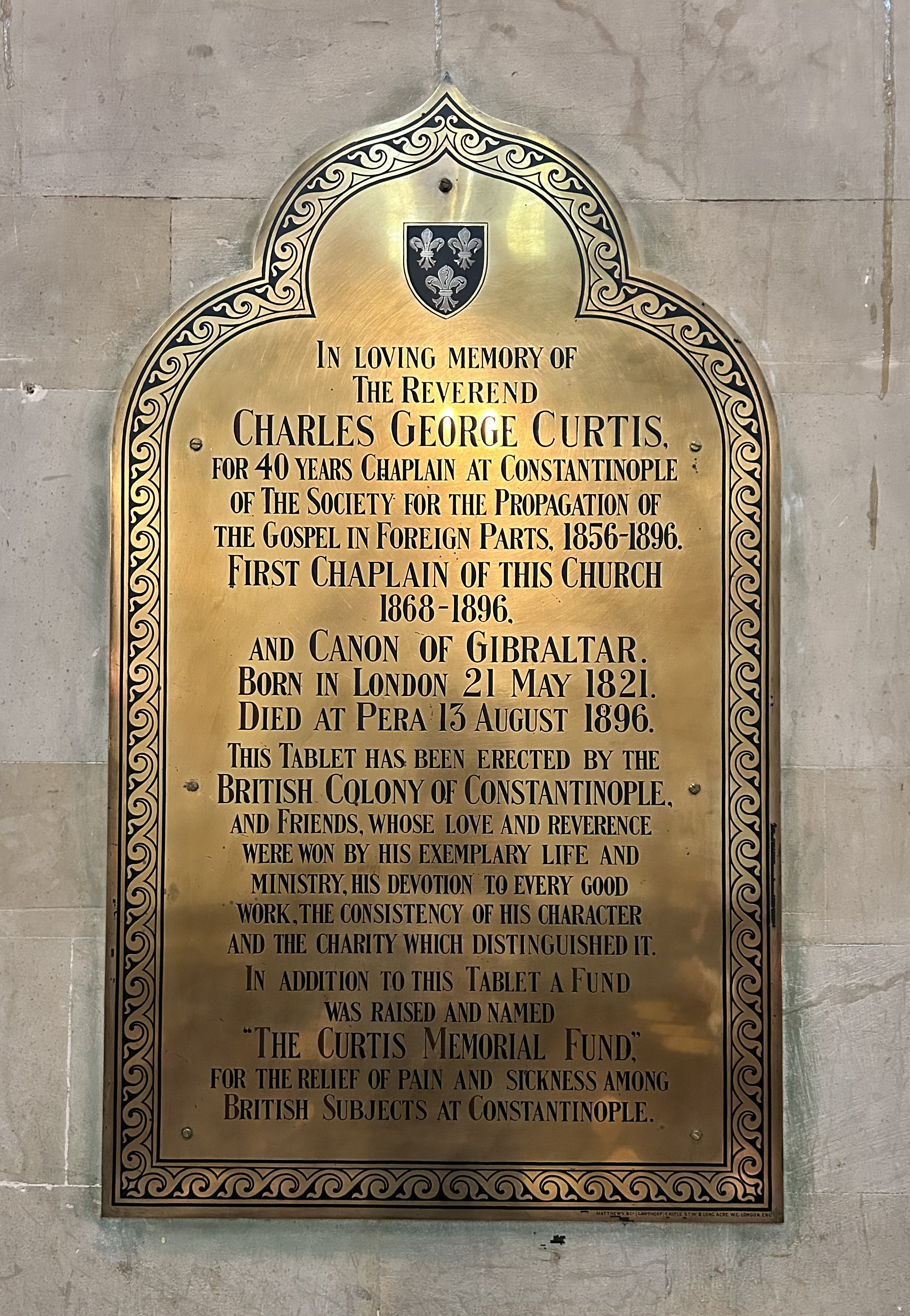
Memorial tablet to Charles George Curtis

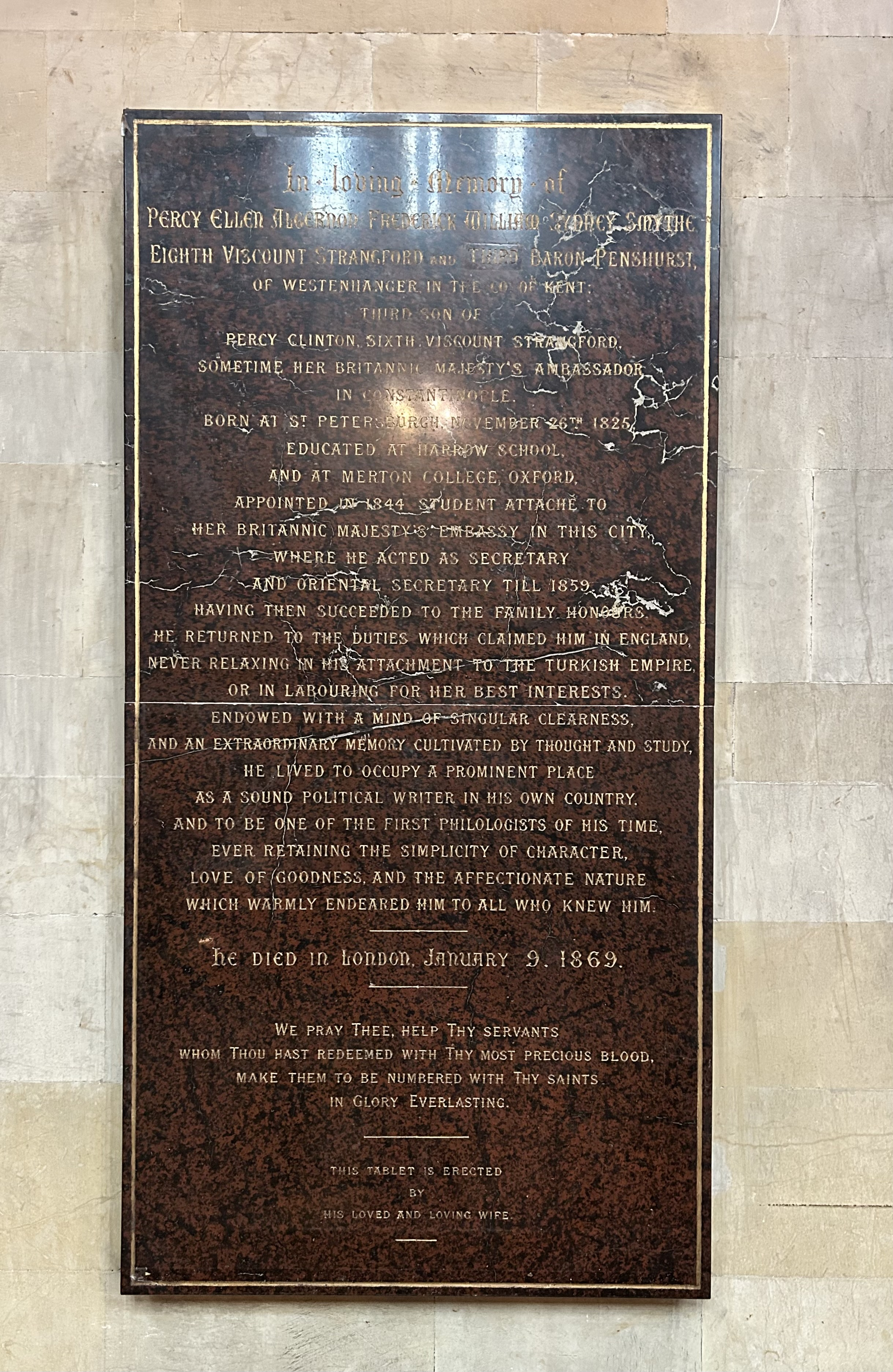
Memorial tablet to Percy Smythe, 8th Viscount Strangford

== See also ==
- Pera House
