= 1998 in Turkey =

- Centuries: 20th; 21st
- Decades: 1970s; 1980s; 1990s; 2000s; 2010s
- See also: List of years in Turkey

Events in the year 1998 in Turkey.

== Parliament ==
- 20th Parliament of Turkey

== Incumbents ==
- President – Süleyman Demirel
- Prime Minister – Mesut Yılmaz
- Leader of the opposition –

Necmettin Erbakan (up to 16 January)
Recai Kutan (from 14 May)

== Ruling party and the main opposition ==
- Ruling party

Motherland Party (ANAP) with coalition partners Democratic Left Party (DSP) and Democrat Turkey Party (DTP)

- Main opposition

Welfare Party (RP) (up to 16 January)
Virtue Party (from 14 May)

== Cabinet ==
- 55th government of Turkey

== Events ==
- 3 January – First Wind farm of Turkey in İzmir Province
- 17 January – Welfare Party (main party of the 54th government of Turkey) was closed by the court
- 17 February – First female military pilots graduated from the military academy
- 10 May – Galatasaray won the championship of the Turkish football league
- 27 June – The 6.3 M_{w} Adana–Ceyhan earthquake shook the area with a maximum Mercalli intensity of IX (Violent), leaving at least 145 dead and 1,500–1,600 injured.
- 1 July – Agreement with the International Money Fund
- 18 August – Operation against the Turkish mafia. Subsequently, relations between some politicians and mafia were revealed
- 16 September – Atilla Ateş, the land forces commander, accused Syria of "hosting terrorists."
- 6 November – High court deposed Recep Tayyip Erdoğan, the future prime minister, as Istanbul Mayor

== Deaths ==
=== January ===
- January 11 – Aydan Siyavuş, basketball coach and player (born 1947)
- January 12 – Sadi Koçaş, military officer and politician (born 1919)
- January 14 – Safiye Ayla, singer of Turkish classical music (born 1907)

=== March ===
- March 16 - Pertev Naili Boratav, folklorist and researcher of folk literature (b. 1907)
- March 17 - Ecmel Kutay, general and 24th Mayor of Istanbul (b. 1927)
- March 19 - Sabiha Rüştü Bozcalı, visual artist and illustrator (b. 1904)

=== April ===
- April 12 - Hanzade Osmanoğlu, Ottoman princess (b. 1923)

=== May ===
- May 15 - Naim Talu, economist, politician and former Prime Minister of Turkey (b. 1919)
- May 16 - Sevim Tanürek, singers of Turkish classical music (b. 1934)

=== June ===
- June 26 - Hacı Sabancı, businessman and philanthropist (b. 1935)

=== July ===
- July 17 - Sedat Celasun, general and former General Commander of the Gendarmerie of Turkey (b. 1915)
- July 26 - Zeki Kuneralp, diplomat (b. 1914)

=== August ===
- August 7 - Bekir Büyükarkın, poet and novelist (b. 1921)
- August 23 - Ahmet Hamdi Boyacıoğlu, judge and former president Constitutional Court of Turkey (b. 1920)
- August 31 - Sabiha Gökçül Erbay, teacher and politician (b. 1900)

=== September ===
- September 1 - Osman F. Seden, film director, screenwriter and film producer (b. 1924)
- September 5 - Lütfü Aksoy, footballer (b. 1911)
- September 7 - Şaban Kartal, footballer (b. 1952)
- September 13 - Necdet Calp, civil servant and politician (b. 1922)

=== October ===
- October 5 - Ahmet Uzel, composer (b. 1930)

=== November ===
- November 8 - Erol Taş, actor Constitutional Court of Turkey (b. 1928)

== Gallery ==
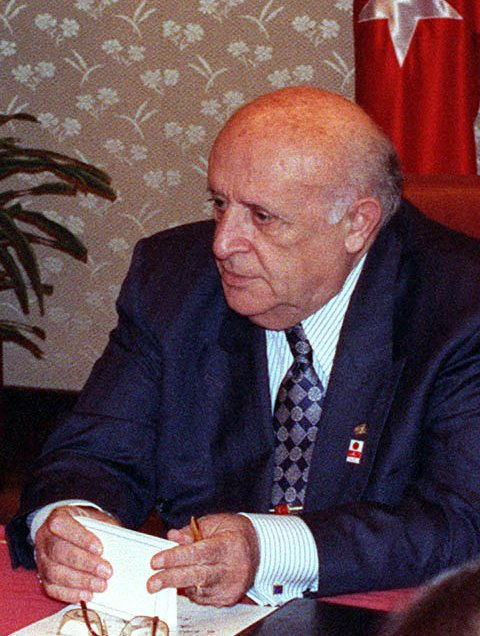
Süleyman Demirel

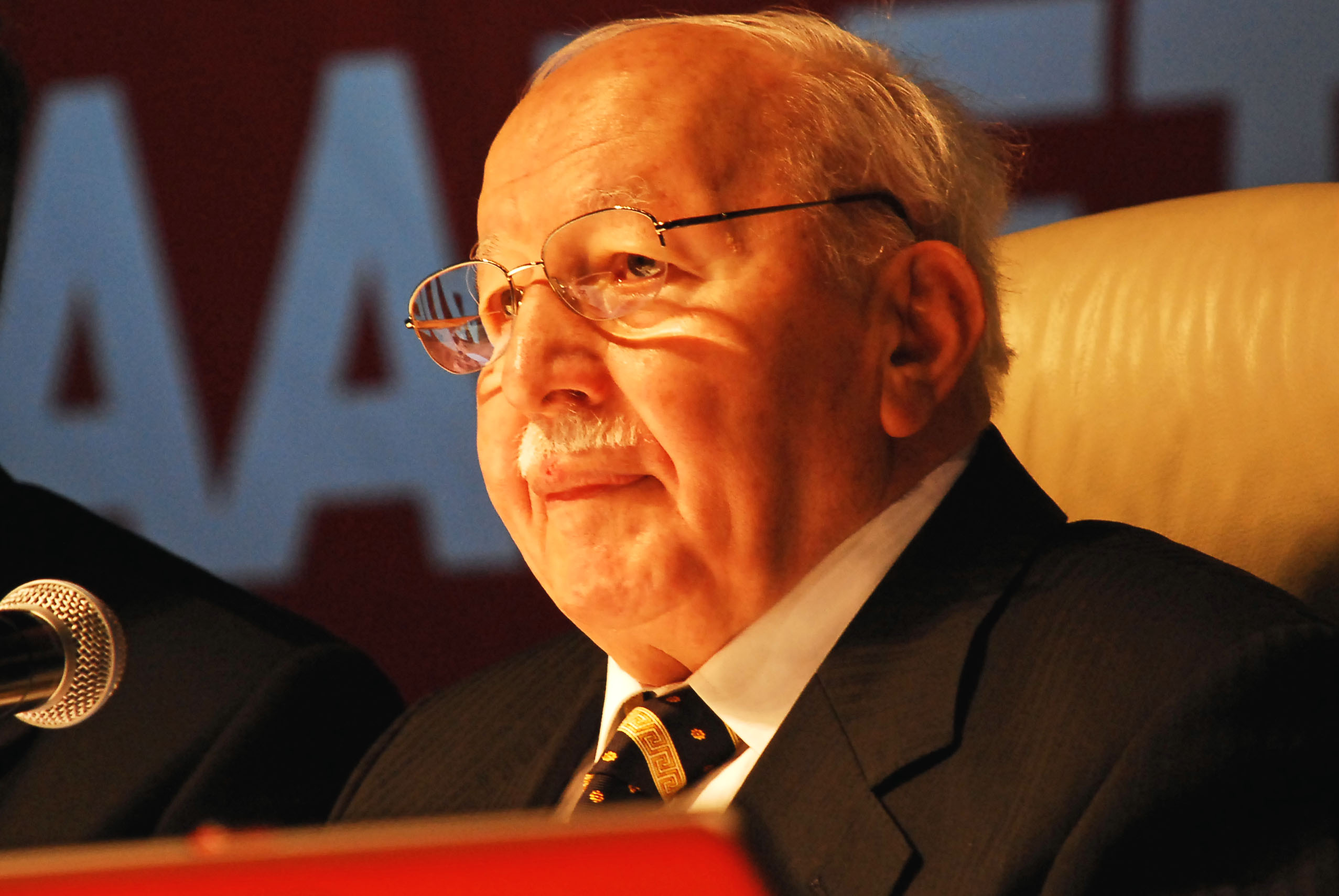
Necmettin Erbakan

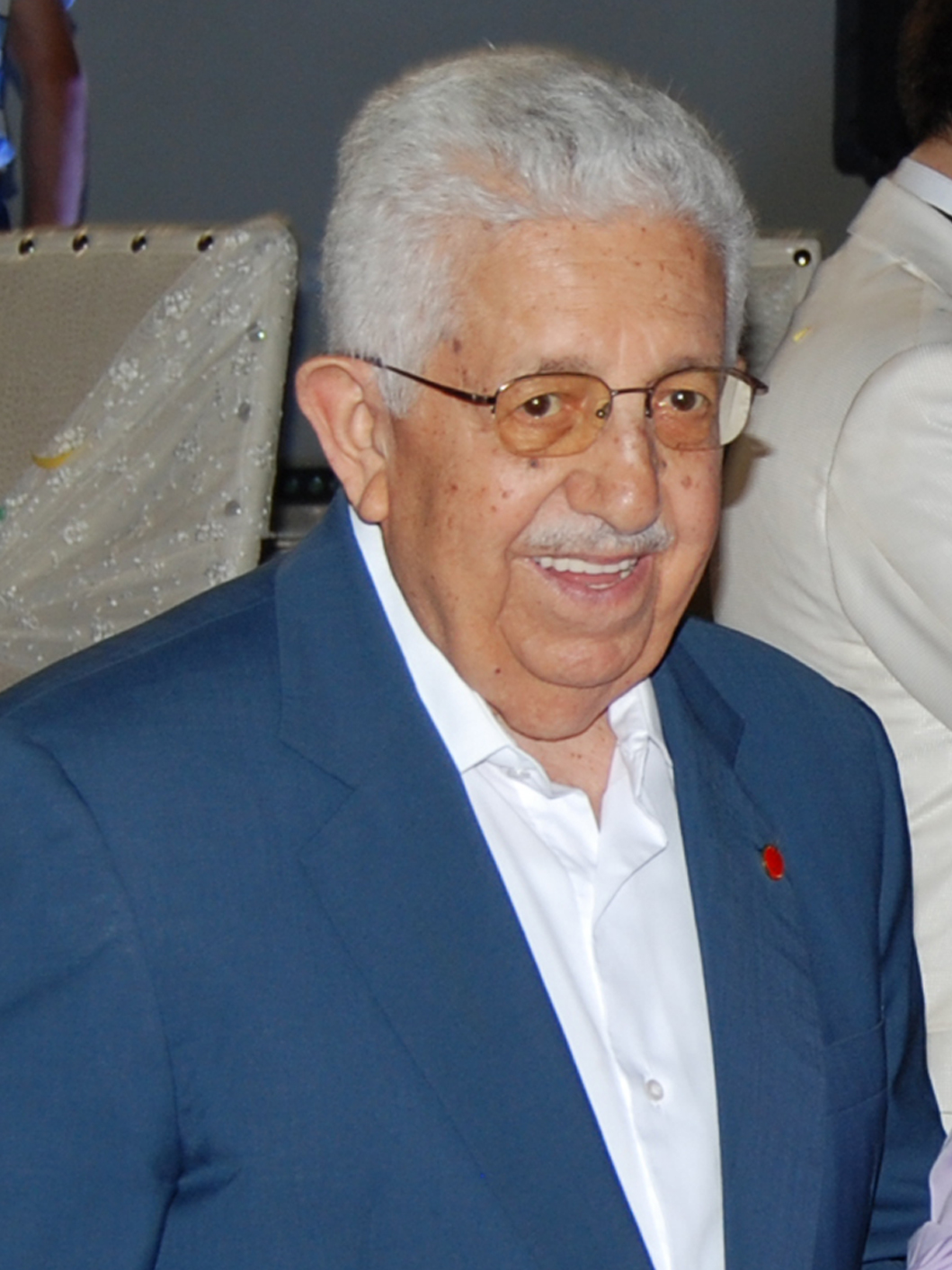
Recai Kutan

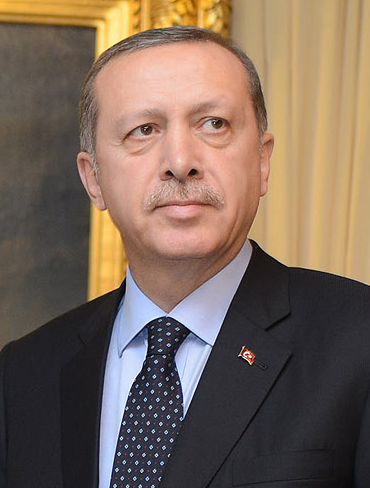
Recep Tayyip Erdoğan

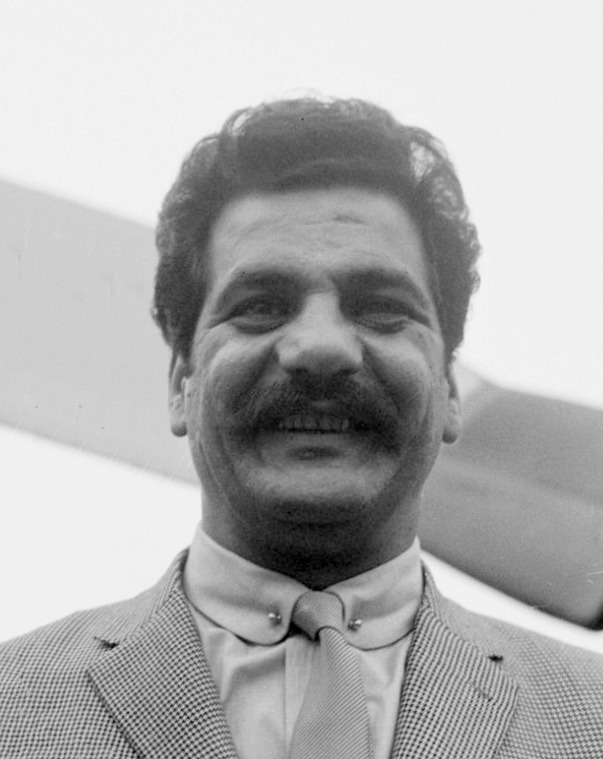
Erol Taş

== See also ==
- 1997-98 1.Lig
- Turkey in the Eurovision Song Contest 1998
- Turkey at the 1998 Winter Olympics
