= Roger Short =

British diplomat (1944–2003)

Roger Guy Short MVO
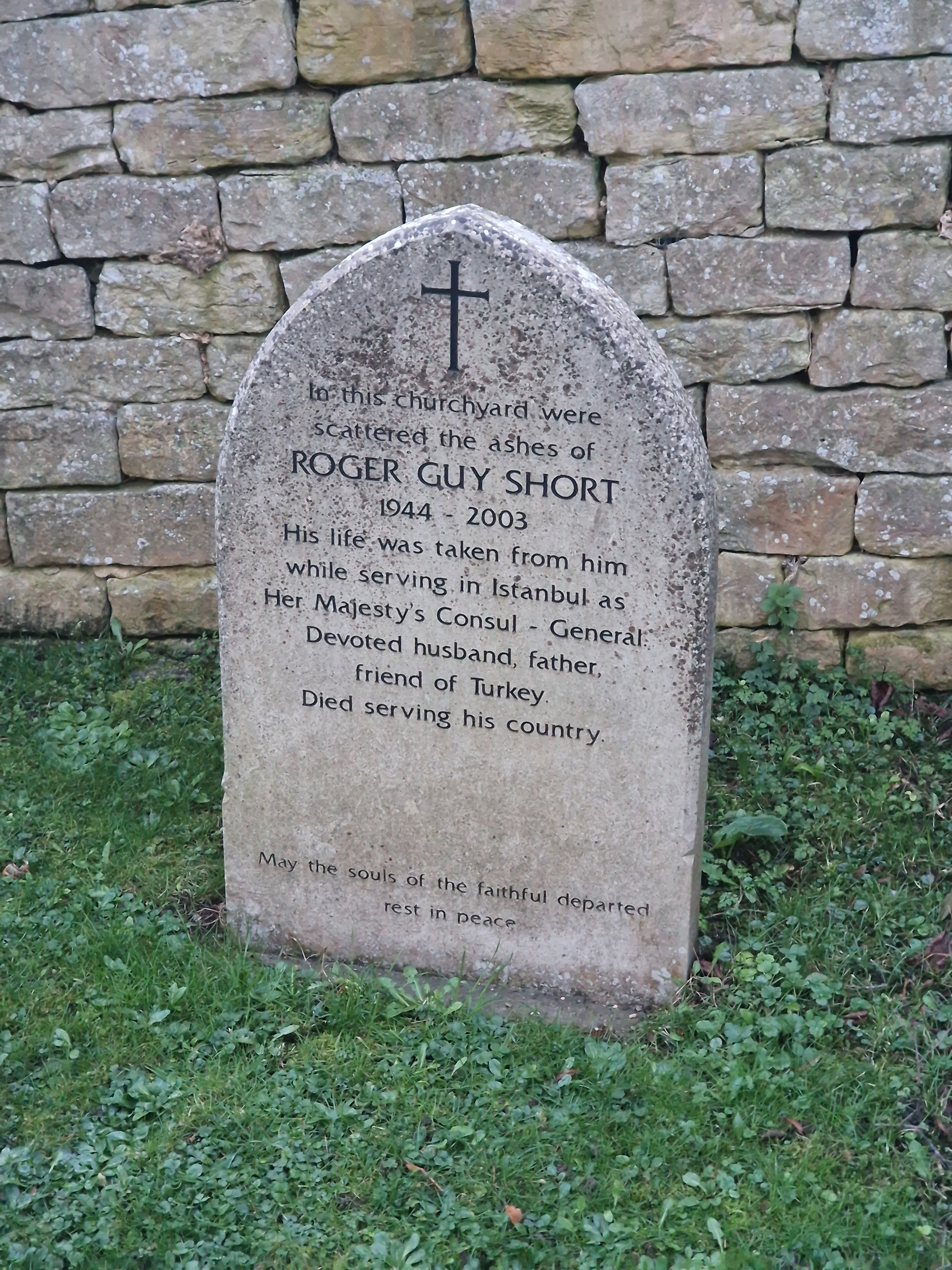
- Roger Short's tombstone, St. Bartholomew's Church, Oakridge Lynch

British Consul-General to Turkey

Personal details
- Born: 9 December 1944 Cape Town, Cape Province, Union of South Africa
- Died: 20 November 2003 (aged 58) Istanbul, Turkey
- Education: University College, Oxford
- Occupation: Diplomat

Roger Guy Short MVO (9 December 1944 – 20 November 2003) was a British diplomat who was murdered on 20 November 2003 in an Al-Qaeda terrorist truck bombing in Istanbul while serving as the British Consul-General in Turkey. The bombing is likely to have been targeted directly at Short and his consular staff because they were diplomatic representatives of the United Kingdom.

Two bombs exploded within five minutes of each other, one at the British consulate, the other at a local branch of HSBC Bank. A statement issued by the Office of the Istanbul Governor Public Order Operations Centre on the day of the attacks reported that 27 people had died (11 at the HSBC General Directorate, and 16 at the British Consulate) with more than 450 people injured. On 24 November the Istanbul Provincial Health Directorate confirmed the total number injured and hospitalised as 462 people, of whom 30 were still receiving treatment, 6 of them in a critical condition.

== Birth and education ==
Born in Cape Town, Union of South Africa, in December 1944, Short was educated in England at Malvern College. He won a scholarship to read Classics at University College, Oxford, and went up to the college in Michaelmas term 1963. He graduated in 1967.

== Diplomatic career ==
Short joined the British Foreign Office in 1967 and was widely considered to be an expert in Turkish affairs, as well as being fluent in the Turkish language. His first overseas posting was to Ankara, the Turkish capital, in 1969. He served as commercial consul in Rio de Janeiro from 1978 to 1980, returning to Turkey in 1981 as Head of Chancery. He moved to Norway as Head of Chancery and consul-general in Oslo from 1986 to 1990, and served as the British ambassador to Bulgaria from 1994 to 1998, and Chief of Staff of the Office of the High Representative in Sarajevo from 1999 to 2000. He was made a Member of the Royal Victorian Order in 1971.

== Personal life ==
Short was married to Victoria, and they had three children, Katherine, Lizzie, and Thomas. He was an active member of the Church of England and was personally responsible for leading the restoration of the Chapel of St Helena, one of three Anglican churches in Istanbul. He was a regular worshipper at Christ Church, Istanbul, the Anglican Church in the Karaköy (Galata) area of the city. He had been entertaining the Archbishop of Canterbury, Dr Rowan Williams, just two days before the terrorist attack in which he died. The Archbishop expressed his personal "shock and grief" at Short's murder.

== Death and memorials ==
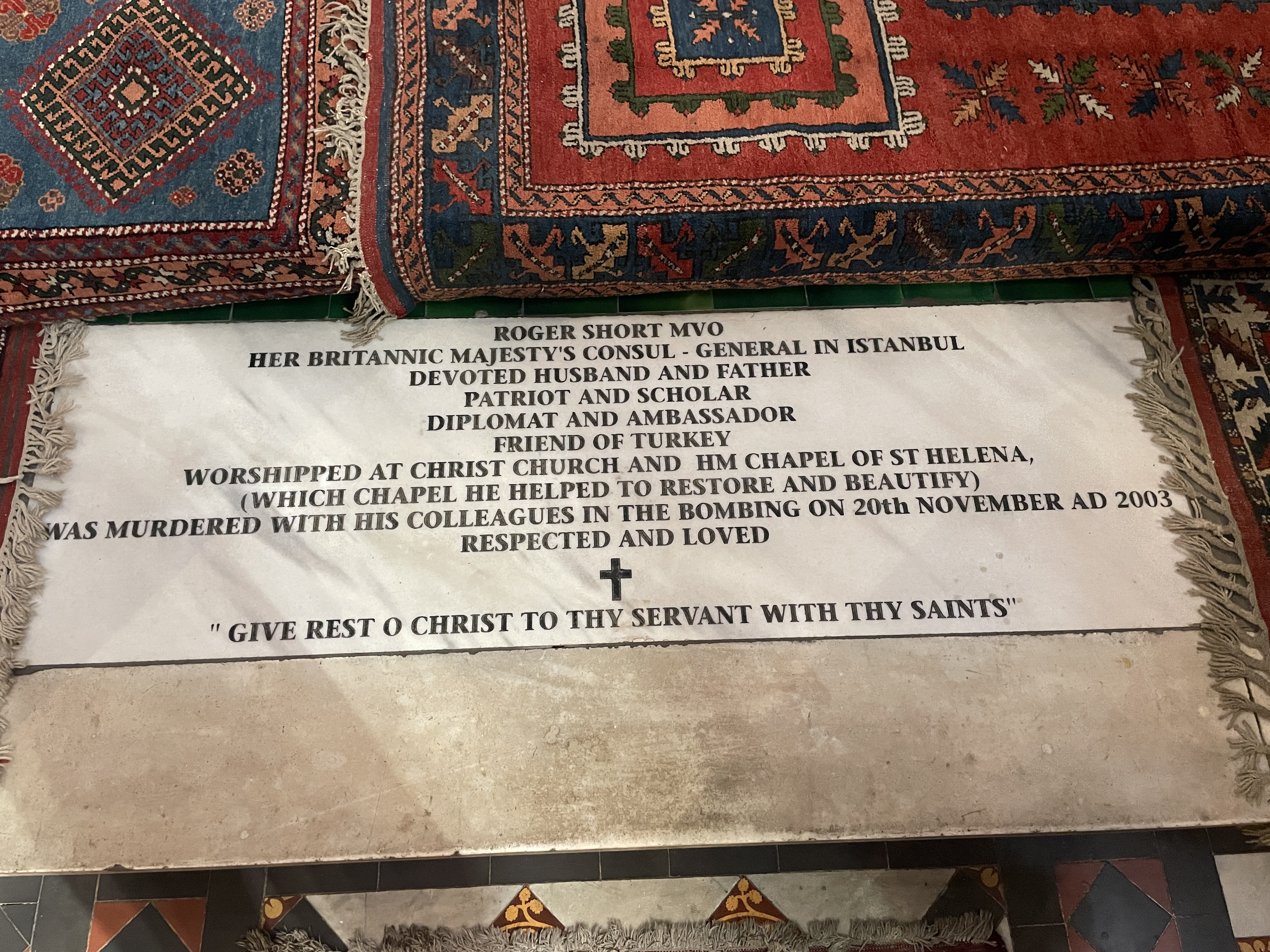
Memorial to Roger Short in Christ Church, Istanbul.

Following his funeral, Roger Short was cremated, and his ashes were scattered in the churchyard of St. Bartholomew's Church, Oakridge Lynch, in Gloucestershire. The Roger Short Memorial Fund was established in his memory, and is administered by his former college in Oxford. The fund provides travel bursaries for students wishing to explore Turkey or its immediately neighbouring countries. There is also an annual Roger Short Dinner, at which a prize is awarded to one of the travel bursary recipients for their travel journal. A permanent memorial stone was installed prominently in the chancel of his regular church, Christ Church, Istanbul.
