= 2001 sex strike for running water =

2001 protest in Turkey

The 2001 sex strike for running water in Turkey began when women in a Turkish village initiated a nonviolent direct action to persuade the men of the village to fix a broken water system. It has been considered an example of a successful sex strike.

== Background ==
In 2001, a southern Turkish village Sırtköy suffered from a broken down water supply system. This was not the first time the system had stopped, leaving the 600-person village without running water for months at a time. When the water system breaks down, the women must walk several miles to a small public fountain in order to have water for drinking, cooking and bathing.

In mid-July 2001, women in the village began a sex strike to encourage their husbands to demand that the government repair the water system. The idea of the sex strike came from a Turkish movie from 1983 named Şalvar Davası in which women held a sex strike for better equality between the genders.

The lack of running water prevented women from bathing after sex, which is traditionally required of Muslim women. This ritual is known as ritual purification, which has to do with preparation for prayer that occurs five times a day.

Within one month of the sex strike, the men began asking the Antalya government for assistance to fix the water system. On August 15, the government supplied the village with enough resources to fix the water system themselves.

== Related events ==
A film, The Source, was created in 2011 capturing a similar story in a North Africa. In the film, the women of the village take part in a sex strike against having to walk to a water source to collect water.
