= Etenna =

Archaeological site in Turkey

Coordinates: 37°00′06″N 31°26′57″E

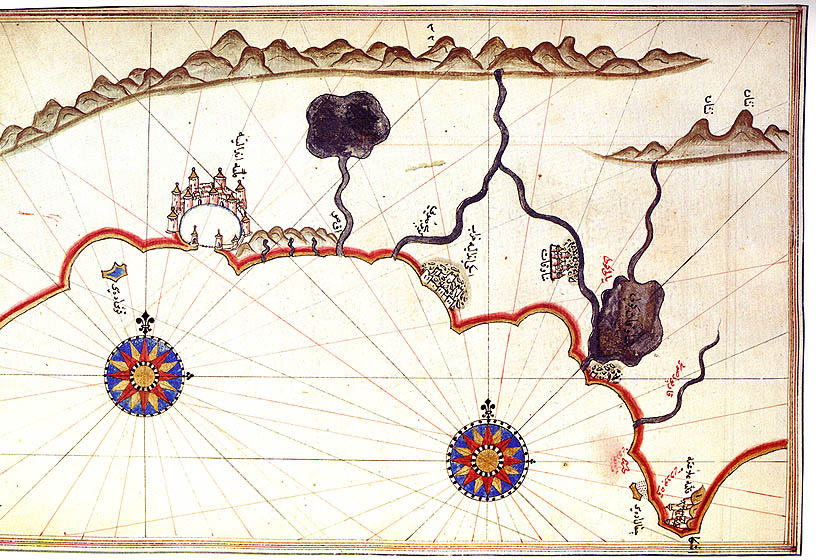
Map of the Etenna area in 1520, Etinna is in the hills behind Side.

Etenna (Ancient Greek: Ἔτεννα) was a city in the late Roman province of Pamphylia Prima. Centuries earlier, it was reckoned as belonging to Pisidia, as by Polybius, who wrote that in 218 BC, the people of Etenna "who live in the highlands of Pisidia above Side" provided 8,000 hoplites to assist the Seleucid usurper Achaeus.

== Coinage ==
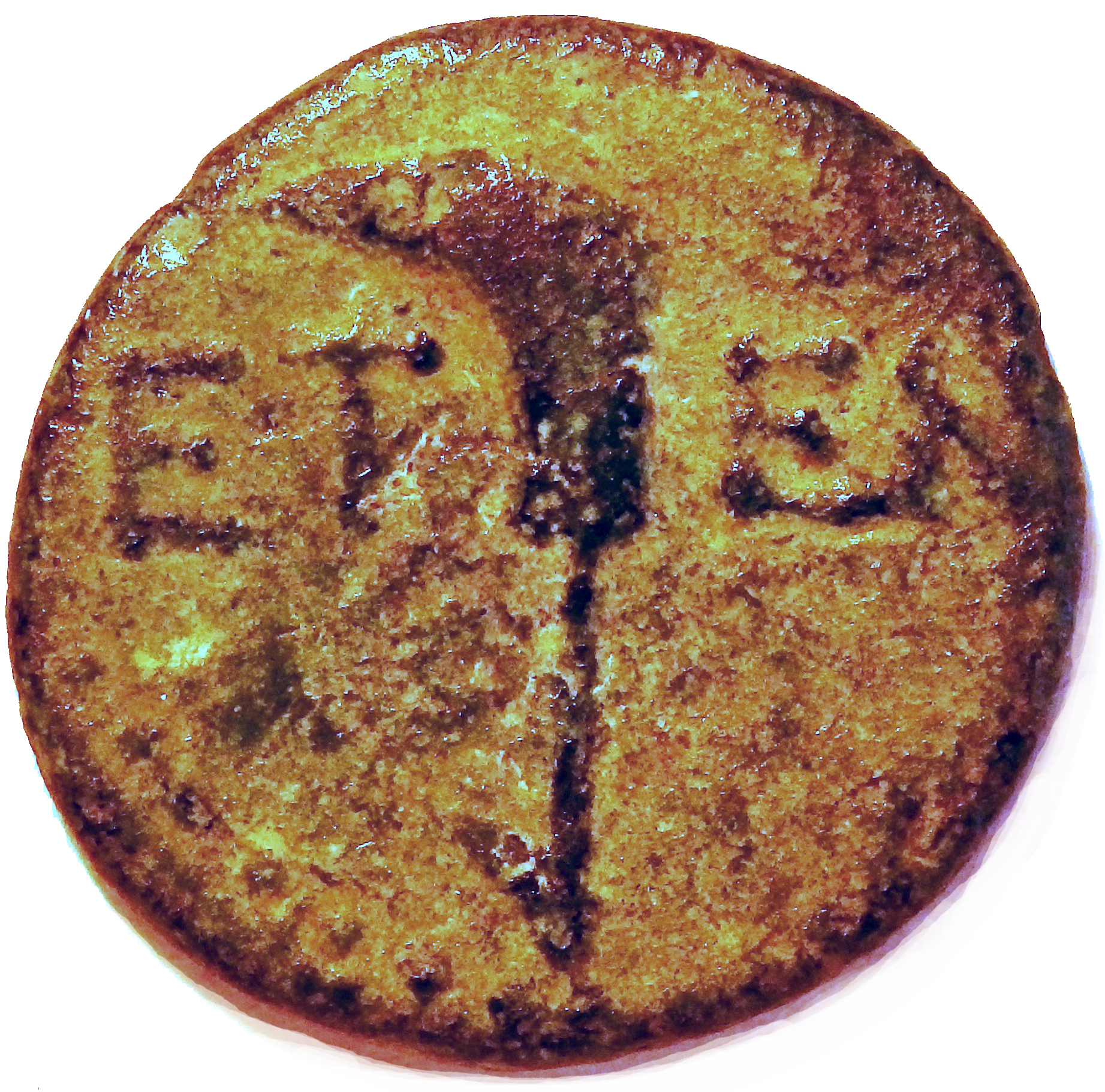
A coin from Etenna.

There is no other mention of Etenna in extant documents until the record of the participation of bishops of Etenna in the ecumenical councils of the 4th century AD and later. However, there are examples of its fine silver coinage of the 4th and 3rd century BC and of its bronze coins dating from the 1st century BC to the 3rd century AD.

== Bishopric ==
The Christian bishopric of Etenna was ecclesiastically a suffragan of the metropolitan see of Side, the capital of the province of Pamphylia Secunda. Known Bishops include:

- Troilus was at the First Council of Constantinople in 381,
- Eutropius at the Council of Ephesus in 431.
- Eudoxius at the Council of Chalcedon in 451,
- Ioannes at the Second Council of Nicaea in 787, and
- Petrus at the Photian Council of Constantinople (879).

Seeing Etenna as no longer a residential bishopric, the Catholic Church lists it as a titular see, although the area around Etenna was never actually of Catholic confession. Among the titular bishops of Etenna were

- Francis Xavier Ford (18 June 1935 – 11 April 1946, later bishop of Kaying, martyred for his faith),
- James Byrne (10 May 1947 – 16 June 1956, later bishop of Boise),
- Thomas Holland (31 October 1960 – 28 August 1964, later bishop of Salford).
- Henri-Louis-Marie Mazerat (1 Sep 1958 Appointed - 30 Jun 1960)

The town and bishopric of Cotenna, also given as belonging to the Roman province of Pamphylia Prima, is by some reckoned to be the same as Etenna, but appears in the Notitiae Episcopatuum side by side with Etenna and distinct.

== Remains ==
On the basis of the preponderance of locally minted coins Etenna and the presence of potsherds of the Classical period in Greece, unusual inland elsewhere, Etenna has been identified with the rather undistinguished ruins on a steep hillslope 250–500 metres north of the modern village of Sirt, which lies north of Manavgat, Antalya Province, Turkey. They have not been systematically excavated, but include remains of city walls, a roofed reservoir, baths, two basilicas, a church and rock tombs.

The identification of Etenna with Gölcük, near the modern village of Sarraçlı, further east beyond the river Melas, is considered less likely.
