= 2003 Istanbul bombings =

Al-Qaeda suicide bombings in Istanbul, Turkey

- Map showing the locations of the bombing attacks
- Location: Istanbul, Turkey
- Date: First attacks – 15 November 2003: 9:30 a.m. (first explosion); 9:34 a.m. (second explosion); Second attacks – 20 November 2003: 10:55 a.m. (first explosion); 11:00 a.m. (second explosion) (UTC+02:00)
- Target: First attacks: The Bet Israel Synagogue in Şişli and the Neve Shalom Synagogue in Beyoğlu; Second attacks: The British Consulate in Beyoğlu and the HSBC General Directorate building in Beşiktaş
- Attack type: Mass bombing
- Weapons: Trucks laiden with improvised explosive device made of ammonium nitrate and nitrocellulose
- Deaths: 55 civilians, 4 bombers
- Injuries: Over 750
- Perpetrators: Al-Qaeda; Great Eastern Islamic Raiders' Front
- Motive: Islamic terrorism

The 2003 Istanbul bombings were a series of suicide attacks carried out with trucks fitted with bombs detonated at four locations in Istanbul, Turkey, on 15 and 20 November 2003.

On 15 November, two truck bombs were detonated, one in front of the Bet Israel Synagogue in Şişli at around 9:30 a.m. local time (UTC+2.00) and another in front of the Neve Shalom Synagogue in Beyoğlu at around 9:34 a.m. As a result of these bombings, 28 people died, included the attackers, and more than 300 people were wounded. Five days after the first attacks, on 20 November, two attacks were perpetrated against the British Consulate General at around 10:55 a.m. and the HSBC General Headquarters in Beşiktaş at around 11:00 a.m., again using truck bombs. In the second round of attacks, 31 people lost their lives and more than 450 were injured. In total, 59 people died, including the four suicide bombers, and more than 750 were wounded in the bombings.

Investigations launched in the wake of the attacks determined that Al-Qaeda had orchestrated the bombings. The criminal case that began with 69 defendants and, with additions, included 76 defendants in February 2004 regarding the attacks concluded in April 2007 with the sentencing of 49 defendants, of whom seven were sentenced to life in prison, and the remainder to various periods of incarceration. Some of the figures allegedly from the upper echelons of the militant organization fled to Iraq after the attacks and died there, while a portion were captured by security forces. After a retrial held because the Court of Cassation reversed some of the verdicts delivered in the initial trial, 16 defendants were not sentenced to prison.

== First bombings and aftermath ==
The first attacks were carried out on 15 November 2003 against two synagogues in Istanbul, Turkey. At approximately 9:30 a.m. local time (UTC+2.00), a bomb-laden truck that had parked in front of the Bet Israel Synagogue on Nakiye Elgün Street in Şişli was detonated. Many of the worshippers praying at the synagogue that Saturday, a day considered sacred by Jews, and those near the temple lost their lives, and the area surrounding the synagogue was badly damaged.

Approximately four minutes after the first explosion, at around 9:34 a.m., a second attack occurred with the detonation of another bomb-laden truck passing by the Neve Shalom Synagogue on Büyük Hendek Avenue in Beyoğlu. Prayers were being held in three separate rooms of the synagogue, and a child's bar mitzvah ceremony was being held with 400 people in attendance. Because the walls of the synagogue had been fortified after previous attacks, the internal walls of the structure were not badly damaged, but the external wall and surrounding shops and buildings were damaged, and passers-by were killed by the blast. A hole approximately three meters wide and two meters deep appeared at the spot where the bomb exploded.

Teams from the Istanbul Metropolitan Fire Department, Health Department, Directorate of Road Maintenance, and Directorate of Cemeteries; the Istanbul Gas Distribution and Trade; and the Istanbul Water and Sewage Administration arrived at the scenes of both attacks. Search-and-rescue teams dug survivors out from beneath the debris resulting from the explosions and sent them to nearby health institutions. A team from ZAKA coming from Israel that comprised seven people who were experts in search-and-rescue and identification participated in the work after the explosions.

An Islamic militant group, IBDA-C, claimed responsibility for the blasts, but it was later determined that the attacks had been carried out by Al-Qaeda.

== Second bombings and aftermath ==
Five days later, on 20 November, as US President George W. Bush was in the United Kingdom meeting with Prime Minister Tony Blair, two more truck bombs exploded. The first attack occurred at around 10:55 a.m. (UTC+2.00) with the detonation of a bomb, comprising 700 kilograms of ammonium sulfate, ammonium nitrate, and compressed fuel oil, in a truck that had parked in front of the HSBC Bank AS building on Büyükdere Avenue in the Levent neighborhood of Beşiktaş. There were fatalities and injuries inside and near the building, and after the explosion, the first six aboveground stories of the building became unusable and the front side of the building was badly damaged. Inside the building, an elevator that had been in motion at the time of the bombing collapsed. Body parts were flung from the site of the explosion, some even being found as far as 400 meters away at a petrol station.

Approximately five minutes later, at around 11:00 a.m., another bomb-laden truck drove through security and detonated in front of the British Consulate on Meşrutiyet Avenue in Istanbul's Beyoğlu district. Deaths and injuries were immediately reported from the explosion, and the outer wall of the consulate's front garden collapsed onto cars driving by in the street, and a fire burned in the garden itself. Buildings nearby the consulate, including the entrance to the Çiçek Passage market, and cars on the street were also badly damaged.

After the attack on the HSBC building, police cordoned off the area and began collecting evidence. Electrical and gas lines were shut off, and metro services were stopped. The wounded and other personnel were evacuated from the rear entrance of the building. The fire department, civil defense, provincial health directorate, police, and consulate officials dispatched to the area began search-and-rescue operations. Police also cordoned off the area surrounding the consulate. Within a day, Interior Minister Abdülkadir Aksu, Istanbul Governor Muammer Güler, and Istanbul Provincial Security Director Celalettin Cerrah participated in the investigations. Shortly after the two attacks, a warning of an additional bombing at the Galleria Shopping Center in Bakırköy began to spread; the Akmerkez, Galleria, and Carousel shopping centers were evacuated, although the warnings ended up being baseless.

The bombers appeared to have waited for the traffic lights in front of the HSBC headquarters to turn red to maximize the effects. Police say that the bombers may have timed the attacks to coincide with Bush's visit to the UK.

== Casualties ==
=== First attacks ===
On the day the attacks were carried out, the Istanbul Provincial Health Directorate issued a statement at 4:00 p.m. that 20 people had died and 257 were injured in the bombings. A few hours later, Health Minister Recep Akdağ announced that the number of deaths was 20 and that 302 people had referred to various hospitals because of the bomb attacks. Interior Minister Abdülkadir Aksu, however, stated that the identified number of injured people was 277. Later the evening of the attack, a statement issued by the Istanbul Security Directorate increased the number of casualties to 23, it shortly thereafter brought the number back down to 20. The following day, Istanbul Provincial Health Director Erman Tuncer reported, again, that 23 people had died and that about 71 people, of whom four were in critical condition, continued to receive medical attention at various hospitals. The number of casualties rose to 24 on 17 November when the body of a woman was found at the scene of the bombing and later to 25 when a victim receiving treatment at a hospital succumbed to their injuries. In a statement he made on 19 November, Istanbul Governor Muammer Güler announced that 25 people had died and approximately 300 people were injured as a result of the attacks. On 28 November, Istanbul Deputy Security Director Halil Yılmaz reported, in a press release riddled with inaccuracies, that 23 people had died from the first bombings but later corrected the mistakes in a statement to the press and changed the number of casualties to 27. This number rose to 28 on 9 February 2004 when Celal Dilsiz, a patient who had been receiving care in a hospital for almost three months, died from his injuries.

The funeral ceremonies for six Jews who died in the attacks—Yoel Ülçer Kohen, Berta Özdoğan, Yona Romano, Annette Rubinstein, Anna Rubinstein, and Avram Varol—were held at the Ulus Ashkenazi Jewish Cemetery. The six people were laid to rest in the front section of the mausoleum where 23 people killed in the 1986 attack on the Neve Shalom Synagogue were buried.

=== Second attacks ===
A statement issued by the Office of the Istanbul Governor Public Order Operations Center on the day of the second attacks reported that 27 people had died—11 in the attack in front of the HSBC General Directorate and 16 at the British Consulate—and more than 450 people were injured in the bombings. According to a written statement on 24 November from the Istanbul Provincial Health Directorate, 432 people had been treated and discharged from the hospital and 30 people, of whom six were in intensive care, were still receiving treatment. On 28 November, Istanbul Deputy Security Director Halil Yılmaz reported that 28 people had died in the second attacks, shortly thereafter later raising this figure to 30. Two months later, on 13 January 2004, the number of casualties in the second two attacks rose to 31, when Sefer Gündoğdu, a 35-year-old father of three, died at around 5:00 p.m. at Şişli Etfal Hospital after undergoing a series of surgeries.

Turkish actor and singer Kerem Yılmazer died in the HSBC bombing as he was going to the NTV building, where he worked as a voice actor on the Life Style program at the TV channel. Yılmazer's wife, actress Göksel Kortay, was on a live program on TV8 when the news of the bombings broke. The 58-year-old British consul general and career diplomat Roger Short also perished in the attack.

== Damage ==
Istanbul Governor Muammer Güler, in a statement on 19 November, announced that inspections of 58 buildings in Beyoğlu after the synagogue attacks revealed nine buildings that were severely damaged, three that were moderately damaged, and eight that were somewhat damaged, amounting to damages of TL 37 billion (equivalent to approximately US$25 million in November 2003). In Şişli, of the 52 buildings examined, none were severely damaged, seven were moderately damaged, and 12 were somewhat damaged, with damages totaling TL 33 billion (about US$22.5 million in November 2003). There was a total of TL 110 billion (approximately US$75 million in November 2003) in damages and 33 cars—15 in Beyoğlu and 18 in Şişli—were made unusable due to the first bombings.

A total of 113 buildings were damaged in the second round of attacks. Beyloğlu Municipal Mayor Kadir Topbaş announced that 38 buildings, of which 25 were considered historic, were damaged in Beyloğlu. Beşiktaş Municipal Mayor Yusuf Namoğlu reported that 75 buildings were damaged in Levent, including a historic school building in the nearby Zincirlikuyu quarter.

== Reactions ==
Various nations condemned the attacks and offered their condolences, including the US and Germany.

== Responsibility ==
Initially, a militant Turkish Islamic group, the Great Eastern Islamic Raiders' Front took responsibility.

Turkey charged 74 people with involvement in the bombings, including Syrians Loai al-Saqa and Hamid Obysi, and a Turk, Harun Ilhan. Ilhan admitted that he and two other suspected ringleaders — Habib Akdaş and Gurcan Bac — were responsible; Ilhan referred to himself as ‘an al-Qaeda warrior'. Akdas fled to Iraq, where he was reportedly involved in a kidnapping, and was later killed by coalition forces in Fallujah. Bac's location remains undetermined. Other reporting indicates that Bac was suspected of preparing the bombs with Fevzi Yitiz, and that Akdas and Ibrahim Kus participated in a meeting with bin Laden in 2002. Al-Saqa had already been tried in absentia in Jordan for his part, along with al-Qaeda in Iraq leader Abu Musab al-Zarqawi, in the failed poison gas attack in 2002. On 16 February 2007, Al-Saqa and Ilhan were convicted and sentenced to 67 consecutive life sentences, one for every victim for the bombing plus additional terms for terrorism and conspiracy, as were five other Turkish men convicted of organising the bombing: Fevzi Yitiz (for helping to build the truck bombs) and Yusuf Polat, Baki Yigit, Osman Eken and Adnan Ersoz. Seyit Ertul was sentenced to 18 years' imprisonment for leading an al-Qaeda cell, and Obysi was sentenced to 12 years and 6 months for al-Qaeda membership, forgery and bomb-making. Of the other individuals who were charged, 29 were sentenced to 6 years and 3 months for aiding and abetting al-Qaeda, 10 were sentenced to 3 years and 9 months membership in al-Qaeda, and 26 were acquitted. A Turkish intelligence official who was part of the investigation said: "They planned and carried out the attack independently after receiving the blessing of bin Laden."

However, in 2010, Turkish investigators accused three of the highest-ranking military leaders at the time of the bombing of orchestrating the attacks in the hopes of destabilising the government and prompting a military coup. Gen Çetin Dogan, head of the 1st Army and then deputy chief of the military staff, Gen Ibrahim Fırtına, ex-air force chief, and former naval commander Admiral Özden Örnek, along with 35 other ex-military personnel were arrested and questioned concerning their roles in Operation Sledgehammer, of which the bombings were reportedly a part.

== See also ==
- 1999 Istanbul bombings
- 2008 Istanbul bombings
- 2022 Istanbul bombing
- List of terrorist incidents, 2003
