= Ali Akan =

Namibian football manager

Personal information
- Date of birth: Turkey

Managerial career
- Years: Team
- Black Africa SC
- Blue Waters FC
- FC Civics Windhoek
- FC AK
- Orlando Pirates SC

Ali Akan is a Kurdish-Namibian football manager who last managed FC Civics Windhoek.

== Life and career ==
Akan is of Kurdish ethnicity. He obtained Namibian citizenship through marriage. He has been nicknamed "Mr Fix It". He was appointed manager of Namibian side Black Africa SC, and helped the club win the league. After that, he was appointed manager of Namibian side Blue Waters FC, also helping the club win the league. Thereafter, he was appointed manager of Namibian side FC Civics Windhoek. He helped the club win the league. After that, he was appointed manager of South African side FC AK. He helped the club win the league.

After that, he was appointed manager of Namibian side Orlando Pirates SC. He has been described as "coached the Hardap Region team to victory in the annual Namibian Newspaper Youth Cup in Walvis Bay in 2006". He became the first manager to win the Namibian top flight with three different sides. He has been regarded as one of the most prominent managers in Namibia. He has also been regarded as one of the most decorated managers in Namibia. In 2015, he returned to Namibian side Orlando Pirates SC as chairman.
