= Kerem Yılmazer =

Turkish actor and singer (1945–2003)

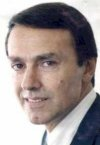
- Born: Muhittin Kerem Yilmazer; 2 February 1945; Denizli, Turkey
- Died: 20 November 2003 (aged 58); Istanbul, Turkey
- Occupation(s): Actor, singer
- Years active: 1960s–2003
- Spouse: Göksel Kortay (m. 1979)

Muhittin Kerem Yılmazer (2 February 1945 – 20 November 2003) was a Turkish actor and singer who was killed in the 2003 terrorist bombings in Istanbul.
