= Bet Israel Synagogue (Istanbul) =

Synagogue in Istanbul, Turkey

- Hebrew: קהל קדוש בית ישראל
- Location of the synagogue in Istanbul

Religion
- Affiliation: Judaism
- Rite: Nusach Sefard
- Ecclesiastical or organizational status: Synagogue
- Status: Active

Location
- Location: Efe Street, Şişli, Istanbul, Istanbul Province
- Country: Turkey
- Interactive map of Bet Israel Synagogue
- Coordinates: 41°03′15″N 28°59′09″E

Architecture
- Architects: Aram Deragobyan; Jak Pardo
- Type: Synagogue architecture
- Completed: 1952; 1961 (additions)
- Materials: Concrete

The Bet Israel Synagogue (Hebrew: קהל קדוש בית ישראל), also known as the Beit Israel Synagogue, is a Jewish congregation and synagogue, located on Efe Street, in Şişli, Istanbul, in the Istanbul Province of Turkey.

== History ==
The Bet Israel Synagogue, together with the Neve Shalom Synagogue, is supported and governed by the Neve Shalom Foundation. A synagogue was initially built in the 1920s and enlarged into its present size in the early 1950s due to the majority of the Jewish population moving to that area and the immigration from Nazi occupied territories. It is currently the most populated synagogue in Turkey. The Bet Israel Synagogue can be visited by appointment with the Neve Shalom Foundation.

The synagogue was targeted in the 2003 Istanbul bombings.

== See also ==
- History of the Jews in Turkey
- List of synagogues in Turkey
