= Sırtköy, Manavgat =

Sırtköy
- Neighbourhood
- Location in Turkey
- Coordinates: 36.9941°N 31.4439°E
- Country: Turkey
- Province: Antalya
- District: Manavgat
- Population (2022): 274
- Time zone: UTC+3 (TRT)

Sırtköy is a neighbourhood in the municipality and district of Manavgat, Antalya Province, Turkey. Its population is 274 (2022). Sirtkoy is 104 km from the town of Manavgat.

The ruins of the Roman and Byzantine era city of Etenna lie scattered 400 meters from the modern village. The Altınbeşik Cave National Park lies to the east of the village.
