= HSBC Bank Turkey =

Turkish bank

HSBC Bank A.Ş.
- Company type: Subsidiary of HSBC Holdings plc
- Industry: Finance and Insurance banking financial services
- Founded: 1990; 36 years ago
- Headquarters: Istanbul, Turkey
- Number of locations: 77 branches in Turkey
- Area served: Turkey
- Key people: Brian Robertson (Chairman); Selim Kervancı (CEO)
- Products: Financial services, credit cards, mortgage loans
- Services: Consumer banking Corporate banking Investment banking Private banking Wealth management
- Number of employees: Approx. 2000 (2020)
- Subsidiaries: HSBC Yatırım Menkul Değerler A.Ş. HSBC Portföy Yönetimi A.Ş. HSBC Ödeme Sistemleri Bilgisayar Teknolojileri Basın Yayın ve Müşteri Hizmetleri A.Ş. HSBC İnternet ve Telekomünikasyon Hizmetleri A.Ş.
- Website: www.hsbc.com.tr

HSBC Bank A.Ş., the Turkey subsidiary of the HSBC Group, is a bank with its head office in Istanbul.

== History ==
HSBC Bank A.Ş. was established as Midland Bank A.Ş. in 1990. It was a subsidiary of Midland Bank and was the first British bank in Turkey to be established. Then it was renamed HSBC Bank A.Ş. in 1999. In October 2001, HSBC Bank A.Ş. acquired Demirbank T.A.Ş., the fifth-largest private bank in Turkey from the Turkish financial regulator after it was rescued, during the financial crisis. Demirbank's wholly owned stockbroking and fund management subsidiary, Demir Yatirim was also acquired and the merger of HSBC Bank A.Ş. and Demirbank was successfully completed in December 2001. Other subsidiaries of HSBC Bank A.Ş. are HSBC Ödeme Sistemleri Bilgisayar Teknolojileri Basın Yayın ve Müşteri Hizmetleri A.Ş., HSBC İnternet ve Telekomünikasyon Hizmetleri A.Ş.

== Turkish banking ==
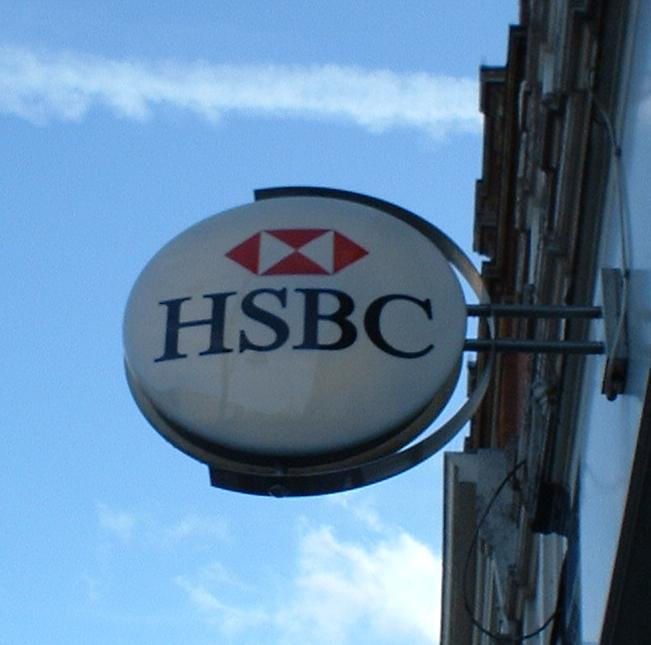
HSBC logo

Under the HSBC brand the bank maintains a network of around 77 branches nationwide (as of July 2020) and offers a comprehensive range of products and services to corporate, commercial and personal customers. HSBC Turkey is part of the European structure within the HSBC Group and therefore reports to HSBC Bank plc.

== Consumer finance ==
On 8 August 2002, HSBC Bank A.Ş. signed a Sale and Purchase Agreement for the acquisition of Benkar Tüketici Finansmanı ve Kart Hizmetleri A.Ş. (Consumer Finance and Card Services) and the Advantage brand from Boyner Holding A.Ş. The purchase of Benkar was completed on 19 September 2002.

== Regional operations ==
HSBC Bank A.Ş. operated 4 branches in the Turkish Republic of Northern Cyprus until the end of 2017. As of 1 December 2017, Friday, HSBC Bank TRNC Operations were transferred to ALBANK.

== Bombing ==
On 20 November 2003, HSBC's headquarters on the Büyükdere Avenue in Levent neighborhood of Şişli, Istanbul were severely damaged in one of a series of bombings in Istanbul in 2003. Three members of HSBC staff lost their lives and a total of 43 were injured in the blasts.

The bank was fully open for business on the following working day, with a temporary headquarters being established in Esentepe, Istanbul and over 3,000 corporate customers informed of the situation on the day of the blast.
