= 2015 in Turkey =

- Centuries: 20th; 21st
- Decades: 1990s; 2000s; 2010s; 2020s; 2030s
- See also: List of years in Turkey

The following lists events that happened in 2015 in Turkey.

== Incumbents ==
- President: Recep Tayyip Erdoğan
- Prime Minister: Ahmet Davutoğlu

== Events ==
=== January ===
- January 6 – A suicide bomber kills two people in an attack on a police station in a popular tourist district in Istanbul.

=== April ===
- April 24, 25 – The 100th anniversary of the Gallipoli campaign was commemorated in Çanakkale and Istanbul.

=== June ===
- June 7 – 24th General election was held to elect the 550 new members of Grand National Assembly of Turkey.

=== July ===
- July 20 – 2015 Suruç bombing

=== October ===
- October 10 – 2015 Ankara bombings

=== November ===
- November 15, 16 – The tenth G20 summit was held in Antalya.

== Deaths ==
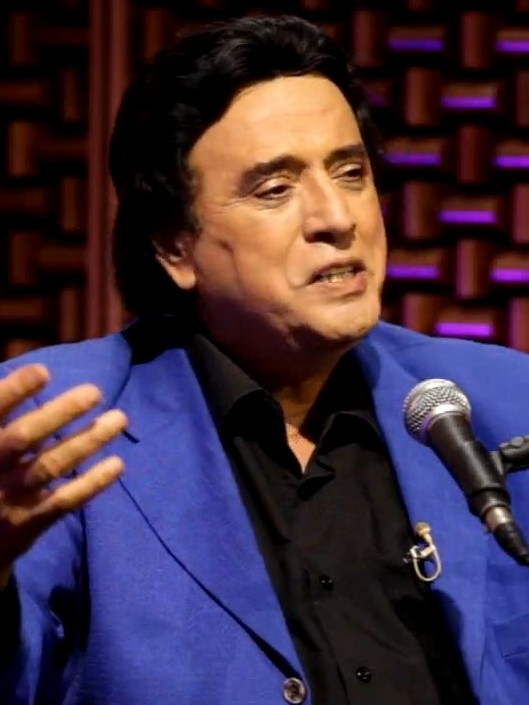
Erol Büyükburç

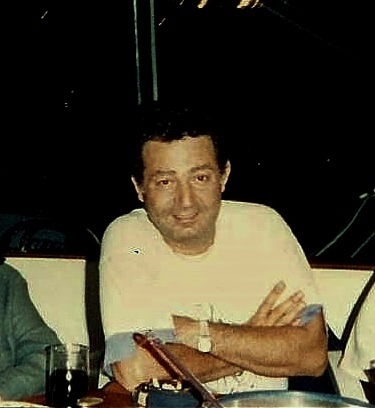
Kayahan

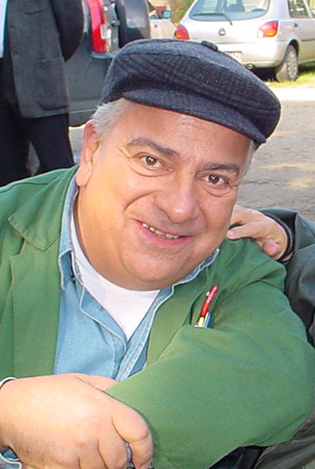
Zeki Alasya

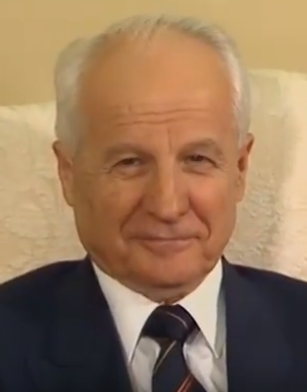
Kenan Evren

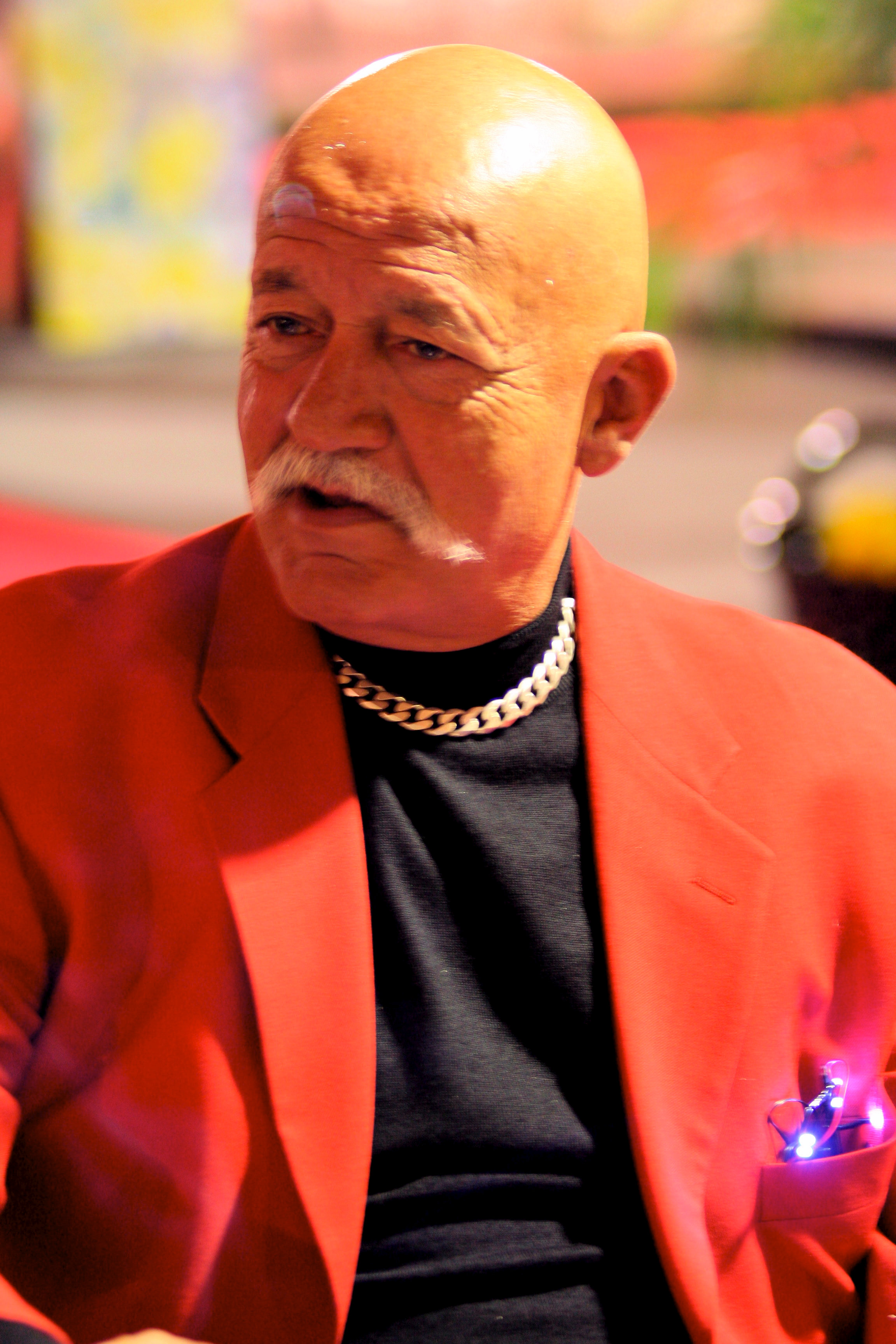
Sümer Tilmaç

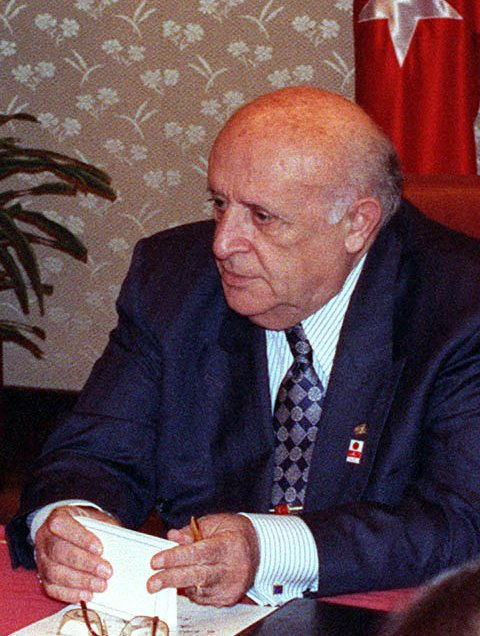
Süleyman Demirel

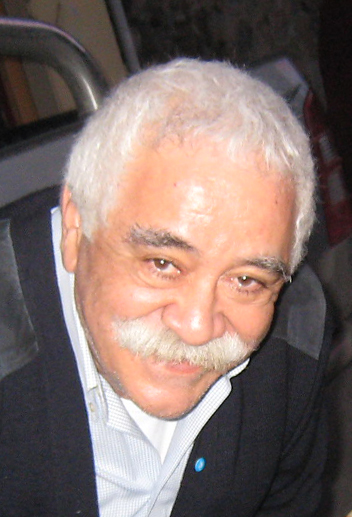
Levent Kırca

=== January ===
- January 4 - Neşe Aybey, miniaturist (b. 1930)

=== February ===
- February 8 - Müzeyyen Senar, classical music performer (b. 1918)
- February 14 - Beria Onger, feminist activist and writer (b. 1921)
- February 16 - Fikret Şeneş, songwriter (b. 1921)
- February 18 - Asuman Baytop, botanist, plant collector, pharmacologist, and educator (b. 1920)
- February 28 - Yaşar Kemal, writer and human rights activist (b. 1923)

=== March ===
- March 16 - Nazmi Yükselen, singer, songwriter and folk music composer (b. 1926)
- March 12 - Erol Büyükburç, singer and songwriter (b. 1936)
- March 29 - Ayla Arslancan, actress (b. 1936)

=== April ===
- April 1 - Muzaffer Tekin, military officer (b. 1950)
- April 3 - Kayahan, singer and songwriter (b. 1949)
- April 19 - Oktay Sinanoğlu, physical chemist and molecular biophysicist (b. 1935)
- April 22 - Şevket Müftügil, judge and former president of the Constitutional Court of Turkey (b. 1917)

=== May ===
- May 8 - Zeki Alasya, actor (b. 1943)
- May 9 - Kenan Evren, politician, military officer, former Chief of the Turkish General Staff and 7th President of Turkey (b. 1917)
- May 14 - Aysel Ekşi, psychiatrist and professor (b. 1934)
- May 31 - Behiye Aksoy, singer (b. 1933)

=== June ===
- June 5 - Sadun Boro, amateur sailor to circumnavigate the globe by sailing (b. 1928)
- June 2 - Besim Üstünel, economics, politician (b. 1927)
- June 12 - Sümer Tilmaç, actor (b. 1948)
- June 17
  - Süleyman Demirel, politician, engineer, 12th Prime Minister of Turkey and 9th President of Turkey (b. 1924)
  - Başar Sabuncu, director, screenwriter and cinematographer (b. 1943)
- June 29 - Osman Necmi Gürmen, novelist (b. 1927)

=== July ===
- July 9 - Tahsin Şahinkaya, Air Force general and former Commander of the Turkish Air Force (b. 1925)

=== August ===
- August 5 – Nuri Ok, judge (b. 1942)
- August 9 – Fikret Otyam, painter and journalist (b. 1926)
- August 19 – Fikri Alican, scientist and physician (b. 1929)

=== September ===
- September 24 – Uğur Dağdelen, footballer (b. 1973)

=== October ===
- October 5 – Tomris İncer, actress (b. 1948)
- October 12 – Levent Kırca, comedian, stage and film actor, columnist and politician (b. 1950)
- October 16 – Memduh Ün, film producer, director, actor and screenwrite (b. 1920)
- October 22
  - Çetin Altan, writer and journalist (b. 1927)
  - Yılmaz Köksal, actor (b. 1939)
- October 30 – Sinan Şamil Sam, heavyweight professional boxer (b. 1974)

=== November ===
- November 3 – Semih Özmert, judge (b. 1921)
- November 4 – Gülten Akın, poet (b. 1933)
- November 21 – Cavit Şadi Pehlivanoğlu, politician (b. 1927)
- November 23 – Kâmran İnan, diplomat, scholar and politician (b. 1929)

=== December ===
- December 23
  - Nimet Özgüç, archaeologist (b. 1916)
  - Bülend Ulusu, admiral and 18th Prime Minister of Turkey (b. 1923)
- December 27 – Hüseyin Başaran, sports commentator (b. 1958)

== See also ==
- List of Turkish films of 2015
