= International Law and Economics Conference =

The first International Law and Economics Conference in Turkey was organized by Bilkent University Faculty of Law in Ankara between 25–26 April 2014. During the conference, speakers coming from 13 different countries made more than 40 presentations. Some of the papers presented were later published in the European Journal of Law and Economics.

Organization Committee of the International Law and Economics Conference was composed of:

- Osman B. Gürzumar Dean of the Faculty of Law of Bilkent University
- Hans-Bernd Schäfer Professor at Bucerius Law School (Hamburg), visiting professor at the Faculty of Law of Bilkent University
- Halil Baha Karabudak Instructor at the Faculty of Law of Bilkent University
- Aslı E. Gürbüz Usluel Assoc. Dean of the Faculty of Law of Bilkent University
- Hüseyin Can Aksoy (Conference Secretary), Instructor at the Faculty of Law of Bilkent University

Keynote lectures and invited speeches were delivered by:

- Robert Cooter, Berkeley School of Law
- William Kovacic, George Washington University
- Timur Kuran, Duke University
- David Levi-Faur, Hebrew University of Jerusalem
- Stefan Voigt, Hamburg University

A second International Law and Economics Conference was held at Bilkent University on 9 May 2015.
