= 2014 in Turkey =

- Centuries: 20th; 21st
- Decades: 1990s; 2000s; 2010s; 2020s; 2030s
- See also: List of years in Turkey

The following lists events in the year 2014 in Turkey.

== Incumbents ==
- President: Abdullah Gül (until 28 August), Recep Tayyip Erdoğan (starting 28 August)
- Prime Minister: Recep Tayyip Erdoğan (until 28 August), Ahmet Davutoğlu (starting 28 August)

== Events ==
=== January ===
- 3 January – Turkish lira falls on world currency markets following moves by Central Bank to halt capital flight and strong criticism by Prime Minister Erdogan.
- 20 January – Two car bombs kill at least 16 people in an attack on a border post on the Turkish-Syrian border.
- 28 January – Turkish lira and other emerging market currencies fall further, despite doubling of interest rate by Central Bank.

=== February ===
- 7 February – A plane is forced to land in Turkey following a bomb threat from a passenger on board a flight from Kharkiv in Ukraine.
- 9 February – Tear gas and water cannons used by the Erdoğan government against street protests against his government's internet restrictions.
- 10 February – Stalled negotiations over Cyprus resume between Turkish and Greek governments.

=== April ===
- 25-26 April – The first International Law and Economics Conference was held at Bilkent University.

=== May ===
- 13 May – an underground coal fire at a mine in Soma, Manisa, killing 301 people.
- 24 May – The 6.9 M_{w} Aegean Sea earthquake shook the area with a maximum Mercalli intensity of VIII (Severe). Three hundred and twenty-four were injured.

=== June ===
- 8 June – Turkey starts work on huge Istanbul Airport.

=== August ===
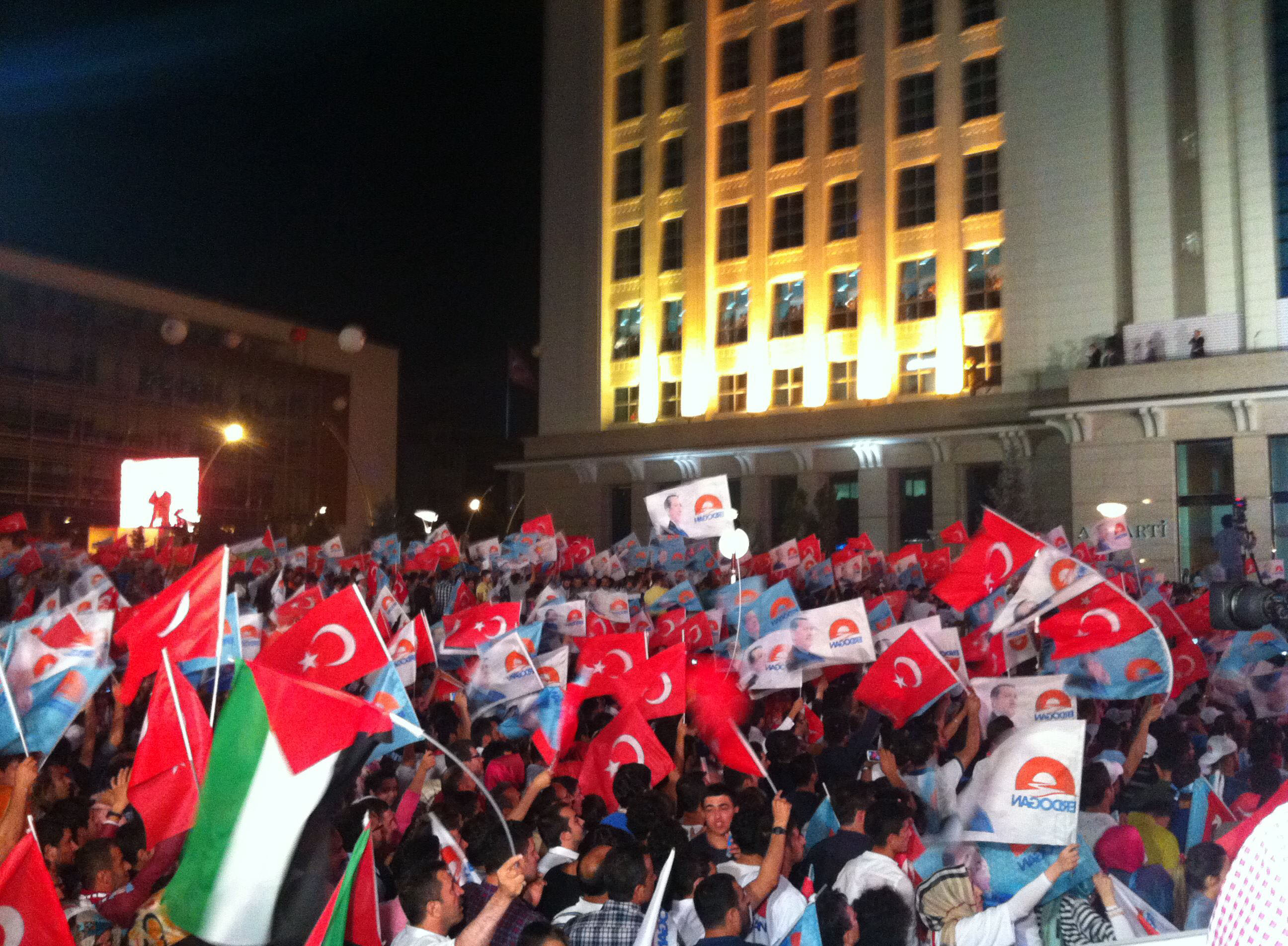
Justice and Development Party fans celebrating victory of Erdoğan in front of the AK Party headquarter after Turkish Presidential election, Ankara.

- 10 August – Turkey's Premier Is Proclaimed Winner of 2014 Turkish presidential election. Erdoğan's presidential win.

=== October ===
- 10 October – 36 killed during mass protests across Turkey in protests over Ankara's policies towards the ISIL.

=== November ===
- 1 November – Turkey breaks from its policy of preventing Kurdish fighters from entering Syria and allows 150 Iraqi Peshmerga to cross into Kobani.
- 3 November – A small boat carrying asylum seekers sinks in the Black Sea near Istanbul resulting in at least 21 deaths.
- 28 November – Pope Francis visits Turkey, calling for interfaith dialogue and an end to Islamic extremism, and meeting with President Recep Tayyip Erdoğan and Bartholomew I of Constantinople.

=== December ===
- 1 December – Russia abandons its plans for the South Stream pipeline to Bulgaria due to European Union objections instead looking at a pipeline to Turkey.

== Deaths ==
- 8 January – Selçuk Uluergüven, 73, actor.
- 22 February – Behsat Üvez, 53, singer-songwriter (lung cancer)
- 11 March – Berkin Elvan, 15, student.
- 20 June – Murat Sökmenoğlu, 69, politician

== See also ==
- List of Turkish films of 2014
