= 2012 in Turkey =

- Centuries: 20th; 21st
- Decades: 1990s; 2000s; 2010s; 2020s; 2030s
- See also: List of years in Turkey

Events in the year 2012 in Turkey.

== Incumbents ==
- President: Abdullah Gül
- Prime Minister: Recep Tayyip Erdoğan

== Events ==
- 18 March – Police intervene in early Navroz gatherings in multiple cities; clashes cause one death, numerous injuries, and a great many arrests.
- 5 April – The Call to Poetry, a one-night performance art / international poetry gathering event, is held in Istanbul.
- 22 June – Syria's air defenses shoot down a Turkish military aircraft after it enters Syrian airspace over territorial waters.
- 6 September – An overcrowded migrant boat sinks off Ahmetbeyli on the Aegean coast, resulting in 61 deaths; 46 people are rescued, and the vessel's captain and assistant are detained.
- 18 November –
  - Clashes in Hakkari province result in the deaths of five Turkish soldiers and four PKK fighters.
  - Hundreds of imprisoned Kurdish militants end a 68-day hunger strike following a call from Abdullah Öcalan.

== Deaths ==
- 1 April – Ekrem Bora, actor
- 12 April – Ayten Alpman, jazz and pop singer
- 25 April – Şahap Kocatopçu, engineer and politician
- 4 August – Metin Erksan, film director
- 15 October – Erol Günaydın, actor
- 14 December – Ertuğ Ergin, alternative pop-rock singer-songwriter

== See also ==
- List of Turkish films of 2012
