= 2013 in Turkey =

- Centuries: 20th; 21st
- Decades: 1990s; 2000s; 2010s; 2020s; 2030s
- See also: List of years in Turkey

The following lists events in the year 2013 in Turkey.

== Incumbents ==
- President: Abdullah Gül
- Prime Minister: Recep Tayyip Erdoğan
- Speaker: Cemil Çiçek

== Events ==
=== January ===
- 7 January - An explosion at a coal mine in the Zonguldak province kills eight miners.
- 17 January - Thousands of Kurds pour into the streets of Diyarbakır to mourn the death of Sakine Cansız, the founder of the Kurdistan Workers' Party, who was killed in Paris, France on the 9th.

=== February ===
- 1 February - The United States embassy is bombed in the capital of Ankara, killing 2 people.
- 2 February - Radical leftist group Revolutionary People's Liberation Party/Front claims responsibility for yesterday's bombing.

=== March ===
- 13 March - Kurdish rebels free eight Turkish citizens who have been held captive for two years.
- 19 March - Two people are injured in bombings on Turkey's justice ministry and headquarters of the governing AK Party in Ankara. This was allegedly done by Kurdish militants.
- 21 March - PKK leader Abdullah Öcalan makes historic calls for peace talks with Turkey after nearly 30 years of violent conflict.
- 22 March - Israeli Prime Minister Benjamin Netanyahu apologises to Prime Minister Erdogan for the killing of nine activists in a raid on Gaza and the US reports they are normalising relations.

=== April ===
- 7 April - US Secretary of State John Kerry arrives in Turkey where discussions over relations with Israel and the Syrian civil war are expected to take place.

=== May ===
- 20 May - A hot air balloon crashes in Cappadocia resulting in 2 tourists dying and another 20 injured.
- 31 May - Protesters are violently removed by riot police in Gezi Park, Taksim Square, Istanbul after days of anti-government unrest based on government attempts in making the country more religious.

=== June ===
- 3 June - Riot police fire tear gas on protesters continuing to demand the downfall of the current government in Istanbul and Ankara.

== Deaths ==
- 19 January – Toktamış Ateş (born 1944), Turkish academician, political commentator, columnist, writer and professor of political sciences at Istanbul University
- 22 February – Behsat Üvez, singer-songwriter, 53 (lung cancer)
- 20 September – Ercan Aktuna
- 29 September – İsmet Kür (born 1916), educator, journalist, columnist and writer
- 6 November – Hayri Polat (born 1948), wrestler
- 25 December – Adnan Şenses

== See also ==
- 2013 in Turkish television
- List of Turkish films of 2013
