= 2016 Gaziantep bombing =

2016 Gaziantep bombing may refer to:

- May 2016 Gaziantep bombing
- August 2016 Gaziantep bombing
