= 2016 in Turkey =

- Centuries: 20th; 21st
- Decades: 1990s; 2000s; 2010s; 2020s; 2030s
- See also: List of years in Turkey

The following lists events that happened during 2016 in Turkey.

== Incumbents ==
- President: Recep Tayyip Erdoğan
- Prime Minister: Ahmet Davutoğlu (until 24 May), Binali Yıldırım (from 24 May)
- Speaker: İsmail Kahraman

== Events ==
- Purges in Turkey (2016–present), 16 July 2016–current
- Kurdish–Turkish conflict (2015–present), 24 July 2015–current
- Turkey–ISIL conflict, 11 May 2013–current

=== January ===
- 12 January – At least ten people were killed and 15 were injured following an explosion in Istanbul's Sultanahmet Square. A suicide bomber was reported to be responsible.
- 14 January – PKK rebels bombed police headquarters in Cinar, Diyarbakır, killing five people and injuring another 39.
- 27 January – .istanbul and .ist begin to be used as domain names on the Internet.
- 30 January – Bakırköy; Picasso's previously stolen painting "Naked Woman Scanning" is recovered by police in Istanbul.

=== February ===
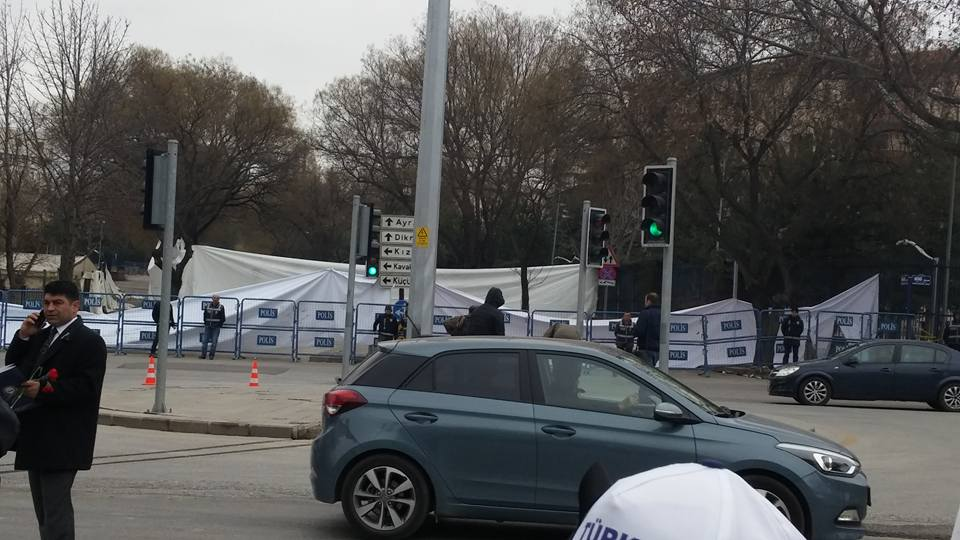
Ceremonies street, the bomb attack in Ankara. An attack by a suicide bomber.

- 17 February – 28 people were killed in a car bombing in Ankara.

=== March ===
- 4 March – The Turkish government seized control of the Zaman newspaper.
- 13 March – 37 people were killed in a car bombing in Ankara.
- 19 March – 5 people were killed in a suicide bombing in Istanbul.

=== April ===
- 10 April – Vodafone Arena was opened.
- 23 - 30 October – the international exhibition organization Expo 2016 was held in Antalya.

=== May ===
- 1 May – May 2016 Gaziantep bombing

=== June ===
- 7 June – A bomb attack occurs in Istanbul's Fatih district by ISIS.
- 17 June - The Istanbul government bans pride marches in Istanbul.
- 28 June – 2016 Atatürk Airport attack by ISIS.

=== July ===
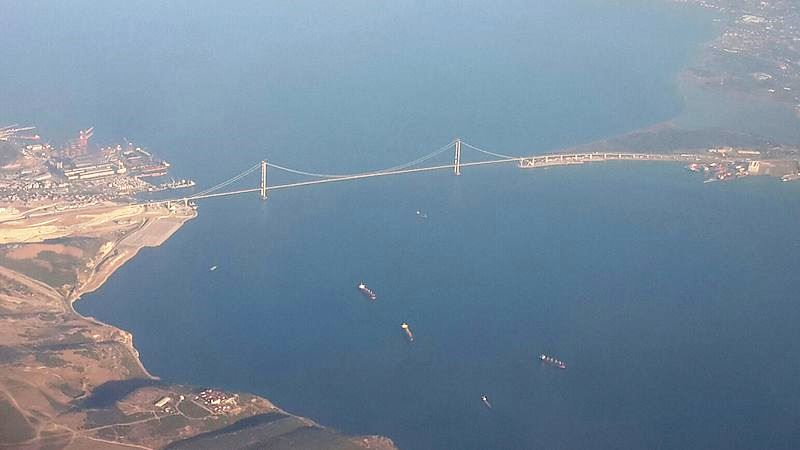
View of Osman Gazi Bridge

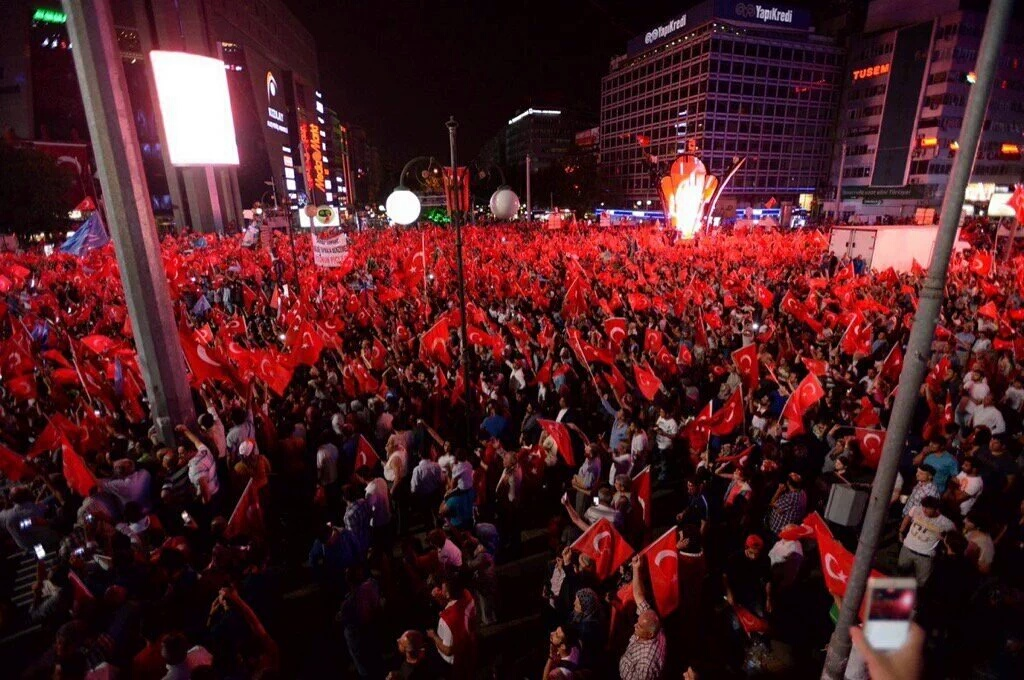
15 July failed coup d'état attempt democracy protests, Kızılay Square.

- 1 July – The world's fourth longest span suspension bridge, the Osman Gazi Bridge was opened to service.
- 15 July – 2016 Turkish coup d'état attempt
- 19 July – Turkey has made a formal request to the U.S. for the extradition of Gülen movement leader Fethullah Gülen.

=== August ===
- 24 August – Turkey has launched a cross border operation with Jarabulus under the code name "Operation Euphrates Shield". The region was cleared by ISIS and handed over to the Syrian National Army.
- 27 August – Yavuz Sultan Selim Bridge opened to service.
- 29 August – The Loud House (Gürültü Ailesi) subsequently premieres on Nickelodeon HD CEE.

=== October ===
- 5 October – 9 October – 2016 Extreme Sailing Series in Istanbul.

== Deaths ==
=== January ===
- January 2 – Sabri Yirmibeşoğlu, Turkish soldier (born 1928)
- January 3 – Halis Toprak, a Turkish businessman
- January 4 – Sedat Üründül, Turkish businessman
- January 5 – Önol Şakar, Turkish politician
- January 7 – Remzi Evren, Turkish cinematographer
- January 14 – Şefik Döğen, Turkish actor
- January 21 – Mustafa Vehbi Koç, Turkish businessman (born 1960)
- January 22 – Kamer Genç, Turkish politician (born 1940)

=== February ===
- February 23 – Tosun Terzioğlu, Former President of TÜBİTAK (born 1942)

=== April ===
- April 20 – Attila Özdemiroğlu, Turkish composer and singer (born 1943)

=== May ===
- May 15 – Oya Aydoğan, Turkish cinematographer (d 1957)

=== July ===
- July 7 – Turgay Şeren, Turkish Football Player and Former Technical Director (born 1932)
- July 15 – Nevzat Yalçıntaş, economist, academic and politician (born 1933)
- July 25 – Halil İnalcık, Turkish historian, history professor (born 1916)

=== August ===
- August 23 – İsrafil Köse, Turkish actress (born 1970)
- August 29 – Vedat Türkali, Turkish writer (born 1919)
- August 30 – Naşide Göktürk, Turkish composer, writer and commentator (born 1965)

=== September ===
- September 8 – Arif Ahmet Denizolgun, 55. Minister of Transport of the Turkish Government (born 1955)
- September 16 – Tarık Akan, Turkish cinema and serial player (born 1949)

=== October ===
- October 12 – Kemal Unakıtan – Turkish politician (born 1946)
- October 20 – Altemur Kılıç – Turkish journalist and writer (born 1924)
- October 26 – Nail Güreli – Turkish journalist and writer (born 1932)

=== November ===
- November 2 – Korkut Özal, Turkish politician (born 1929)
- November 2 – Gönül Ülkü Özcan, Turkish cinema theater and series player (born 1931)
- November 2 – Mete Akyol, Turkish journalist (born 1935)
- November 30 – Erdal Tosun – Turkish actor (born 1963)

=== December ===
December 18 – Süleyman Yalçın – physician and conservative thinker (born 1926)

== See also ==
- 2016 in Turkish television
- List of Turkish films of 2016
