= 2003 in Turkish television =

List of years in Turkish television
- … 1993; 1994; 1995; 1996; 1997; 1998; 1999; 2000; 2001; 2002; 2003; 2004; 2005; 2006; 2007; 2008; 2009; 2010; 2011; 2012; 2013 …
- Art; Archaeology; Architecture; Literature; Music; Philosophy; Science; +...

This is a list of Turkish television related events from 2003.

== Events ==
- 24 May - Turkey wins the 48th Eurovision Song Contest in Riga, Latvia. The winning song is "Everyway That I Can", performed by Sertab Erener.
- June: The "Turkish broadcasting institution (TRT) declares its official aim to launch programmes in languages other than Turkish".

== Channels ==
Launches:

- 19 January: Fenerbahçe TV
- 15 March: Dream TV

== See also ==
- 2003 in Turkey
