= 2004 in Turkish television =

List of years in Turkish television
- … 1994; 1995; 1996; 1997; 1998; 1999; 2000; 2001; 2002; 2003; 2004; 2005; 2006; 2007; 2008; 2009; 2010; 2011; 2012; 2013; 2014 …
- Art; Archaeology; Architecture; Literature; Music; Philosophy; Science; +...

This is a list of Turkish television-related events from 2004.

== Background ==
"By 2004 there were approximately one million Cable-TV subscribers" in the country. Doğan Media Group controlled approximately 40 percent of the broadcasting advertising market. Medya TV, a Kurdish satellite channel, that had been emitting from France since 1999 after having their license (as MED TV) revoked by British authorities, faced the same problem with the French authorities due to alleged links with the PKK; the channel was renamed again and, as Roj TV, started emitting from Denmark from 2004 onwards before repeated Turkish efforts to stop the channel from emitting.

== Events ==
- 15 May - The 49th Eurovision Song Contest is held at the Abdi İpekçi Arena. Ukraine wins the contest with the song "Wild Dances", performed by Ruslana.
- 19 June - Emrah Keskin wins the first season of Türkstar.
- Also in June various channels start broadcasting programmes in non-Turkish languages in the country, an event saluted as a breakthrough for the rights of non-Muslim Turkish people
- July - Barış Akarsu wins the first season of Academi Türkiye.

== Channels ==
Launches:

- 10 June: Kanalturk
- 29 November: TGRT Haber

== Bibliography ==
- Television in Turkey: Local Production, Transnational Expansion and Political Aspirations. (2020). Germany: Springer International Publishing.

== See also ==
- 2004 in Turkey
