= 2018 in Turkey =

- Centuries: 20th; 21st
- Decades: 1990s; 2000s; 2010s; 2020s; 2030s
- See also: List of years in Turkey

Events in the year 2018 in Turkey.

== Incumbents ==
- President: Recep Tayyip Erdoğan
- Prime Minister: Binali Yıldırım
- Speaker of the Grand National Assembly: İsmail Kahraman

== Events ==
=== Ongoing ===
- 2016–present purges in Turkey
- 2018–2022 Turkish currency and debt crisis

=== January ===
- 13 January - The Pegasus Airlines Flight 8622, which was leaving Trabzon Airport for Ankara, landed on the ground 25 meters away from the sea due to technical problems. 162 passengers and 6 crew survived without any injury.
- 17 January - CASA CN 235 military training aircraft crashed in Isparta. 3 soldiers were killed.
- 20 January - Operation Olive Branch started.
- 24 January - A rocket fired from Syria fell into the Çalık Mosque in Kilis city center and damaged a house 100 meters away. 2 people were killed.
- 28 January - Alican Kaynar won the bronze medal at the 2018 Sailing World Cup.

=== February ===
- 3 February - Kemal Kılıçdaroğlu, who received 86.7% of the signatures in the 36th Republican People's Party Ordinary Convention, was elected as the chairman for the 5th time.
- 18 February - In the 2018 Turkish Basketball Cup, Anadolu Efes S.K. defeats Tofaş S.K., winning their 11th title.
- 16 February - The training plane that took off from the İzmir Çiğli 2nd Main Jet Base Command fell down. 2 pilots died.
- 20 February - President Erdoğan said that Turkey should again consider criminalizing adultery and that Turkey made a mistake by not criminalizing adultery to join EU in 2004.

=== March ===
- 11 March - A Bombardier Challenger 604 private jet owned by Turkish group Başaran Holding crashed in the Zagros Mountains near Shahr-e Kord, Iran, while returning to Turkey from the United Arab Emirates. All three crew members and eight passengers on board were killed.
- 13 March - The proposal regarding the creation of the election alliance of the political parties was passed by the Grand National Assembly of Turkey and made into law.
- 18 March - Afrin falls under the control of the Turkish Armed Forces and the Syrian National Army.
- 18 March - In the 12th Ordinary Grand Congress held by the Nationalist Movement Party, Devlet Bahçeli, who was the only candidate, was re-elected as the chairman.
- 22 March - The F-16 aircraft that made a training flight crashed near Nevşehir. 1 soldier died.
- 26 March - The EU–Turkey Summit was held in Varna, Bulgaria.

=== April ===
- 1 April - Meral Akşener, who was the only candidate in the 1st Extraordinary Convention held by the Good Party, was re-elected as the chairman.
- 3 April - The UBAKUSAT nanosatellite was launched into space on board a Falcon 9 rocket.
- 3 April - The construction for the Akkuyu Nuclear Power Plant started.
- 13 April - Darüşşafaka defeats Lokomotiv Kuban in the finale of 2017–18 EuroCup Basketball, winning its first title.
- 18 April - Galatasaray defeats Reyer Venezia in the finale of 2017–18 EuroCup Women, winning its second title.
- 20 April - Proposal concerning a snap election on 24 June was passed and enacted by the Grand National Assembly.

=== May ===
- 6 May - VakıfBank S.K. defeats CSM Volei Alba Blaj in the final of 2017–18 CEV Women's Champions League, winning its fourth title.
- 10 May - Akhisar Belediyespor competed in the finale of the 2017–18 Turkish Cup and by defeating Fenerbahçe S.K. won its first title.
- 13 May - President Erdoğan announced a "mega-scheme" towards infrastructure, including the construction of a large 400 metre wide canal which would cause disruption to farming communities. In response, critics questioned the need for the canal and warned it will destroy an 8,500-year-old archaeological site near Istanbul. They also voiced concern for predicted widespread environmental damage.
- 21 May - In the finale of 2017–18 season of the Women's Basketball Super League, Fenerbahçe Women's Basketball defeats Yakın Doğu Üniversitesi, winning its 13th title.
- 22 May - DenizBank, acquired by Sberbank of Russia in 2012, was sold to Emirates NBD in Dubai for $3.2 billion.

=== June ===
- 10 June - President Erdoğan warned that if the Austrian government were to expel Muslims, it could lead to war. He said: “These measures taken by the Austrian prime minister are, I fear, leading the world towards a war between the cross and the crescent. They say they're going to kick our religious men out of Austria. Do you think we will not react if you do such a thing? That means we're going to have to do something".
- 12 June - TANAP, which connects the giant Shah Deniz gas field in Azerbaijan to Europe, was inaugurated by having its first gas flow.
- 13 June - Ovit Tunnel was opened.
- 13 June - In the 2017–18 Basketbol Süper Ligi, Fenerbahçe Basketball defeats Tofaş S.K., winning its 9th title and 3rd consecutive victory.
- 24 June - The presidential and general elections took place.

=== July ===
- 1 July - Ahmet Çelik won the 92nd Gazi Race with his horse named Hep Beraber. This was the 4th victory for Ahmet Çelik in a row.
- 7 July - The 27th Parliament of Turkey started by the MPs taking their oath.
- 8 July - The Çorlu train derailment occurred in northwestern Turkey when a train derailed, killing 24 passengers and injuring 318, including 42 severely.
- 9 July - After winning an absolute majority in the 2018 Turkish presidential election, Recep Tayyip Erdoğan took his oath during a ceremony attended by leaders of 22 countries and the presidential system in Turkey started.
- 10 July - General Yaşar Güler was appointed as the Chief of General Staff of the Republic of Turkey.
- 12 July - In the third round of the elections held by the Grand National Assembly, Binali Yıldırım was elected as the 28th Speaker of the Grand National Assembly.
- 19 July - The state of emergency, announced on 20 July 2016, officially ended.

=== August ===
- 5 August - Akhisar Belediyespor wins the finale of 2018 Turkish Super Cup by defeating Galatasaray S.K. 5–4 on penalties.

=== October ===
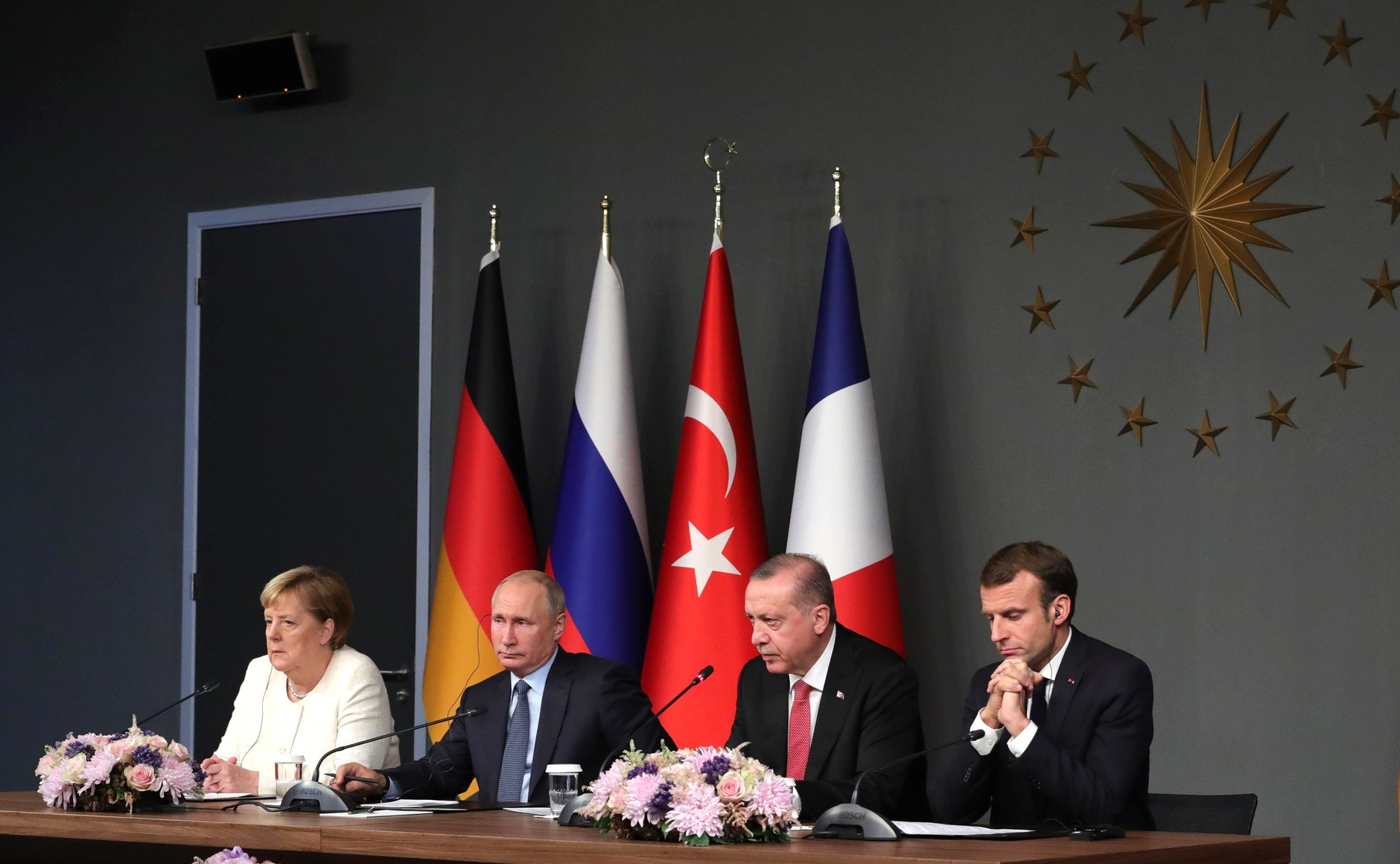
Angela Merkel, Vladimir Putin, Recep Tayyip Erdoğan and Emmanuel Macron when giving a press conference as part of Syria summit in Istanbul, Turkey.

- 14 October - Road accident left 15 migrants dead in Gaziemir, İzmir.
- 19 October - STAR Refinery was commissioned in Aliağa, İzmir.
- 27 October - Russian President Vladimir Putin, German Chancellor Angela Merkel, French President Emmanuel Macron and President Recep Tayyip Erdoğan came together at the Vahdettin Pavilion in Istanbul as part of a summit on the Syrian civil war.

=== November ===
- 11 November - In the 40th Istanbul Marathon, Kenyan Felix Kimutai won the men's title, while Kenyan Ruth Chepngetich won the women's.
- 18 November - Can Öncü became the youngest Grand Prix motorcycle racing winner when he won the 2018 Valencian Community motorcycle Grand Prix aged 15 years, 115 days, and the first Turkish winner of a GP motorcycle road race.
- 23 November - Necmettin Erbakan's son Fatih Erbakan established a party under the name of the Yeniden Refah Party.
- 26 November - A UH-1 type military helicopter crashed in Sancaktepe, Istanbul. 4 soldiers died.

=== December ===
- 13 December - Marşandiz train collision killed 9.

== Deaths ==
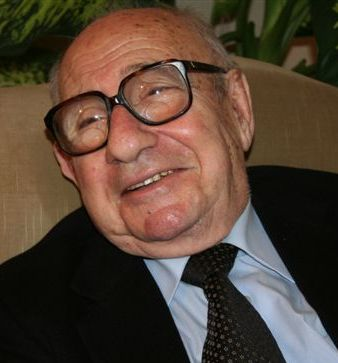
Aydın Boysan

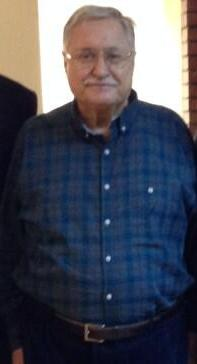
Hasan Celal Güzel

- 5 January –
  - Aydın Boysan, architect (b. 1921).
  - Münir Özkul, actor (b. 1925).
- 9 January – Yılmaz Onay, writer, theatre director and translator (b. 1937).
- 23 January – Lütfi Doğan (politician), theologian and politician (born 1927)
- 7 February – Nabi Şensoy, diplomat (born 1945).
- 14 February – Nuray Hafiftaş, folk singer (b. 1964)
- 15 February – Tosun Bayrak, writer (b. 1926)
- 23 February –
  - Ali Teoman Germaner, sculptor (b. 1934).
  - Celal Şahin, musician and actor (b. 1925)
- 6 March – Muhibbe Darga, archaeologist (b. 1921)
- 8 March – Ercan Yazgan, actor (b. 1946)
- 14 March – Halit Deringör, footballer (b. 1922)
- 19 March – Hasan Celal Güzel, journalist and politician (b. 1945)
- 29 April – Özden Örnek, admiral (b. 1943).
- 16 May – Salih Mirzabeyoğlu, writer and Islamist leader (b. 1950).
- 18 May – Doğan Babacan, football referee (b. 1929).
- 28 May – Semavi Eyice, art historian (b. 1922).
- 29 May – Zeyyat Hatiboğlu, university professor (b. 1925)
- 4 June – Canel Konvur, high jumper (b. 1939).
- 6 June – Ümit Kayıhan, footballer (b. 1954).
- 28 June – Şarık Tara, executive (Enka) (b. 1930).
- 30 June – Fuat Sezgin, orientalist (b. 1924)
