= List of Turkish films of 2012 =

A list of films to be produced by the Turkish film industry in Turkey in 2012.

== Highest-grossing films ==
Highest-grossing Turkish films of 2012
Rank	Title	Studio	Gross (TL)	Gross (US$)
1	Fetih 1453	Tiglon	55,710,841 TL	$31,052,991
2	Evim Sensin	UIP	23,690,977 TL	$13,260,180
3	Berlin Kaplani	UIP	18,246,578 TL	$10,378,337
4	Sen Kimsin?	UIP	14,218,718 TL	$7,910,416
5	Dance with the Jackals 2	Warner Bros.	7,685,732 TL	$4,849,491
6	Moskova'nın Şifresi Temel	Pinema	7,494,482 TL	$4,312,072
7	Çanakkale 1915	Tiglon Film	7,472,906 TL	$4,249,012
8	A Long Story	UIP	6,656,008 TL	$3,781,091
9	Last Stop: Salvation	UIP	5.393.534 TL	$3,031,673
10	Dabbe: Bir Cin Vakası	Pinema	3,155,362 TL	$1,795,788

== Released films ==
Opening	Title	Director	Cast	Genre	Notes
?	Valley of the Wolves: Karabakh	Zübeyr Şaşmaz	Necati Şaşmaz	Action	Part of Valley of the Wolves franchise.
?	Ölü Bölgeden Fısıltılar	Firat Çagri Beyaz	Mete Pere, Leman Özdogan, and Sevcan Çerkez	Drama	

Çanakkale 1915

== See also ==
- 2012 in Turkey
