= List of Turkish films of 2015 =

A list of films produced by the Turkish film industry in Turkey in 2015.

== Highest-grossing films ==
Highest-grossing Turkish films of 2015
Rank	Title	Studio	Gross (TL)	Gross (US$)
1	Dugun Dernek 2: Sunnet	Mars	59,667,404 TL	$23,228,258
2	The Miracle	Pinema	37,700,964 TL	$15,301,749
3	Husband Factor	UIP	20,895,151 TL	$8,052,835
4	Ali Baba and the Seven Dwarfs	Mars	21,850,253 TL	$7,488,205
5	Telling Tales	UIP	16,883,440 TL	$6,740,968
6	Delibal	Warner Bros.	16,793,198 TL	$5,622,792
7	Selam: Bahara Yolculuk	Mars	13,067,237 TL	$4,774,732
8	Ask Sana Benzer	Mars	14,532,504 TL	$4,556,469
9	Stuck with You!	Mars	10,387,448 TL	$4,035,238
10	Niyazi Gül Dörtnala	UIP	10,347,281 TL	$3,841,737

== See also ==
- 2015 in Turkey
