= 2019 in Turkey =

- Centuries: 20th; 21st
- Decades: 1990s; 2000s; 2010s; 2020s; 2030s
- See also: List of years in Turkey

Events of 2019 in Turkey.

== Incumbents ==
- President: Recep Tayyip Erdoğan
- Speaker of the Grand National Assembly: Binali Yıldırım (until 19 February)
- Speaker of the Grand National Assembly: Mustafa Şentop (from 24 February)

== Events ==
=== Ongoing ===
- Purges in Turkey (2016–present)
- 2018–2022 Turkish currency and debt crisis

=== February ===
- 6 February - An 8-storey building in Kartal collapsed killing, 8 people and injuring 14 others.
- 10 February - The grand breaking ceremony for the Atatürk Cultural Center was held in the place of the previously demolished building.
- 11 February - A UH-1 military helicopter crashed in Çekmeköy, killing 4 soldiers. On 26 November 2018, the same type of helicopter had departed this location and fell of around Sancaktepe.
- 13 February - In a call for tinder organized for İddaa, Şans Venture Partnership won the tender.
- 18 February - The Speaker of the Grand National Assembly, Binali Yıldırım, resigns from his post to become a candidate for the Mayor-ship of the Istanbul Metropolitan Municipality at the local elections. He was temporarily succeeded by the Deputy Speaker Celal Adan.
- 24 February - By winning 336 votes, Mustafa Şentop is elected as the new Speaker of the Grand National Assembly.
- 25 February - Turkish scientists established a temporarily base in Antarctica.
- 25 February - Emlak Kredi Bank, which had become defunct in 2001, is reopened under the name Emlak Katılım Bank following an announcement in the Official Gazette.

=== March ===
- 7 March - Çamlıca Mosque is opened on the day corresponding to the Night of Wishes.
- 12 March - Gebze-Halkalı Commuter train line was opened as the second phase of Marmaray expansions. Expeditions were stopped in 2013 for the renewal of suburban lines.
- 31 March - Local elections took place across the country. Ekrem İmamoğlu says he won Istanbul's mayoral election by 29,000 votes, although the country's ruling party says they garnered 48.70% of the votes compared to only 48.65% for İmamoğlu. Binali Yıldırım claims he received 48.71% of the votes and claims victory.

=== June ===
- 23 June - June 2019 Istanbul mayoral election took place. Ekrem İmamoğlu was elected as the new mayor.

=== August ===
- 8 August - A 6-magnitude earthquake occurred in Bozkurt, Denizli. There was no loss of life during this earthquake.
- 19 August - Diyarbakır, Mardin and Van Metropolitan mayors were removed from their posts and temporarily replaced by trustees.

=== September ===
- 16 September - Turkish, Russian and Iranian leaders met during a summit on Syria in Ankara.
- 17 September - Teknofest 2019 started, lasting for a week.
- 26 September - A 5.8 magnitude earthquake occurred offshore the Sea of Marmara in Silivri, Istanbul.
- 26 September - Anadolu Efes S.K. defeated Fenerbahçe Basketball in the finale for the Turkish Basketball Presidential Cup, winning the cup for the 12th time.

=== October ===
- October 10 – Turkish president Recep Tayyip Erdoğan threatens to send the millions of refugees in Turkey to EU member states, over criticism of its Syria offensive.
- 9 October — Rojava offensive.

=== December ===
- 27 December - TOGG Turkish national car is introduced to the public.

== Deaths ==
- 4 January – Turhan Erdoğan, Turkish academic in civil engineering (born 1938)
- 23 January – Ayşen Gruda, Turkish actress and comedian (born 1944)
- 3 February – Turgut Uçar, Turkish football manager and coach (born 1964)
- 19 February - Abdullah Çevrim, Turkish football player (born 1941)
- 26 February – Aytaç Arman, Turkish actor (born 1949)
- 8 March – Mesrob II Mutafyan of Constantinople, the 84th Armenian Patriarch of Constantinople (born 1956)
- 13 March – Beril Dedeoğlu, Turkish academic and politician (born 1961)
- 5 May – Kadir Mısıroğlu, Turkish conspiracy theorist (born 1933)
- 28 July – Ferruh Bozbeyli, Turkish politician (born 1927)
- 15 October – Orhan Birgit, lawyer and politician (born 1927)
- 20 November – F. Tulga Ocak, academic (born 1946)
- 16 December – Sevim Tekeli, academic (born 1924)
