= 2016 in Turkish television =

This is a list of Turkish television related events from 2016. In 2016 Turkey was the fifth largest television program exporter in the world.

== Events ==
- 2 February - Emre Sertkaya wins the fifth season of O Ses Türkiye.
- 6 March - The first season of Big Brother Türkiye is won by Sinan Aydemir.

== Television shows ==
=== 2010s ===
- O Ses Türkiye (2011–present)
- Big Brother Türkiye (2015–present)

== Channels ==
Launches:

- 23 April: Boomerang
- November: Zarok TV

Closures:

- 29 September: Zarok TV

== See also ==
- 2016 in Turkey
