= 2017 in Turkey =

- Centuries: 20th; 21st
- Decades: 1990s; 2000s; 2010s; 2020s; 2030s
- See also: List of years in Turkey

The following lists events that happened during 2017 in Turkey.

== Parliament ==
- 26th Parliament of Turkey

== Incumbents ==
- President: Recep Tayyip Erdoğan
- Prime Minister: Binali Yıldırım
- Speaker: İsmail Kahraman

== Events ==
=== Ongoing ===
- Purges in Turkey (2016–present)

=== January ===
- 1 January – A terrorist attack on the Reina nightclub in Istanbul leaves 39 people dead.
- 2 January – The Islamic State of Iraq and the Levant claims responsibility for the attack on the nightclub yesterday.
- 3 January – The Grand National Assembly of Turkey votes to extend the state of emergency by 3 months after the attempted coup last year.
- 5 January – A car bomb explodes in İzmir perpetrated by TAK, killing 2 people.
- 13 January – President Erdogan vows that Turkish troops will remain in Cyprus in perpetuity and describes proposed terms of a rotating presidency to be unacceptable.
- 14 January – The Parliament of Turkey approves two constitutional amendments to expand the president's power to appoint new legislation and select the cabinet.
- 26 January – Greece refuses to extradite eight soldiers accused of playing a role in the coup attempt last year.
- 28 January – President Erdogan signs a 100 million pound deal with British prime minister Theresa May over the construction of fighter jets.
- 30 January – In the capital of Ankara, 269 people are put on trial after being charged for their roles in the coup attempt last year.
- 31 January – The Eurasia Tunnel, which combines the Asian and European continents with a black tunnel, has started uninterruptedly.

=== February ===
- 5 February – Over 800 suspected ISIL members are arrested by the Turkish police.
- 8 February – 4400 public servants are dismissed in another purge following the attempted coup last year.
- 9 February – A Russian airstrike accidentally killed 3 Turkish troops in al-Bab, Syria.
- 11 February – Abdulgadir Masharipov is charged with murder in relation to the night club shooting at the start of the year and remains incarcerated.
- 14 February – Over 800 people are detained by police due to allegations of them being members of the banned Kurdistan Workers' Party (PKK).
- 17 February – 2017 European Youth Olympic Winter Festival was held in Erzurum.
- 22 February – Turkey lifts the ban on female army soldiers wearing the hijab.
- 28 February – A trial of 330 suspects in last year's attempted coup opens as the largest trial to date.

=== March ===
- 4 March - A Syrian fighter jet crashed in Hatay Province near the Syria–Turkey border.
- 11 March – Dutch authorities withdrew landing permissions for a Turkish minister following his support for the referendum in April. President Erdogan calls the Dutch authorities "Nazi remnants". In response, Dutch authorities expel another minister from Rotterdam to the border with Germany.
- 13 March – Dutch ambassador to Turkey, Cornelis Van Rij, was expelled from Ankara following a Dutch ban on Turkish ministers speaking at pro-Erdogan rallies.
- March 16 - Turkey's Minister of the Interior Süleyman Soylu threatens to send to Europe, 15,000 refugees a month.
- 29 March – Prime Minister Yildirim declares an end to Operation Euphrates Shield in Syria but says an operation will follow under a different name.

=== April ===
- 16 April – The 2017 Turkish constitutional referendum occurred.
- 17 April – President Erdoğan makes favorable statements on the reinstatement of capital punishment, announcing he would discuss the possibility with Devlet Bahçeli of the Nationalist Movement Party (MHP) and the then-Turkish prime minister Binali Yıldırım.
- 19 April – The 2017 Turkvision Song Contest was held in Ankara.
- 29 April – The 2017 block of Wikipedia in Turkey

=== May ===
- 19–21 May – 2017 EuroLeague Final Four

=== June ===
- 23 June – It is reported that the Turkish education ministry announced the removal of evolution from the secondary school curriculum.

=== July ===
- 4 July – "Önce Vatan" Party was shut down by the Constitutional Court of Turkey.

=== September ===
- 22 September – Kadir Topbaş resigned from his position as the Mayor of Istanbul

=== October ===
- 10–15 October – 2017 Presidential Tour of Turkey

== Deaths ==
- 20 January – Vahit Melih Halefoğlu, diplomat and politician (born 1919)
- 28 January – Engin Cezzar, director and actor (born 1935)
- 30 March – Halit Akçatepe, actor (born 1938)
- 1 May – Ahmet İsvan, politician and agronomist (born 1923)
- 6 September – Şerif Mardin, social scientist (born 1927)

== See also ==
- List of Turkish films of 2017
