= Hans-Bernd Schäfer =

German economist (born 1943)

- Born: May 25, 1943 (age 83); Münster

Academic background
- Education: University of Bochum (Dr. disc. oec.); University of Cologne (Diplom-Volkswirt)

Academic work
- Discipline: law and economics (Germany and Europe), development economics, institutional economics
- School or tradition: Law and Economics
- Institutions: Bucerius Law School (Affiliate Prof.), University of Hamburg (Prof. emeritus)
- Website: Information at IDEAS / RePEc

Hans-Bernd Schäfer (born 25 May 1943 in Münster, Germany) is a German economist and a pioneer in the field of law and economics in Germany and Europe.

Schäfer is professor emeritus at the University of Hamburg and former director of the Institute of Law & Economics. Currently he is an affiliate professor at Bucerius Law School in Hamburg, Germany. He has been visiting professor at various universities abroad, including the University of Toronto Faculty of Law, Tel Aviv University faculty of law, George Mason University School of Law (distinguished visiting professor from 2002–2009), and the Indira Gandhi Institute of Development Research. He was a visiting scholar at the University of California, Berkeley, School of Law.

Schäfer served as President of the European Association of Law & Economics from 2004–2007 and was Director of the European Master Programme in Law & Economics from 2004–2008.

In 2012 the faculty of law of the Universidad de San Martín de Porres in Lima awarded him the title of an honorary professor, whilst in 2013 he was awarded the scholar prize of the European Association of Law and Economics. The Latin American and Iberian Law and Economics Association awarded him the scholar prize in 2016. He was appointed to an honorary membership of the Polish Law and Economics Association in 2013 and of the German Law and Economics Association in the year 2016.

== Research and publications ==
Schäfer has published extensively in the field of law and economics, development economics, as well as institutional economics. His textbook "The Economic Analysis of Civil Law" (co-authored with Claus Ott) is broadly considered to be the leading textbook on the economic analysis of civil law, having been translated into English, Spanish, Chinese, Polish, and Portuguese.

- Hans-Bernd Schäfer and Robert D. Cooter. Solomon's Knot: How Law Can End the Poverty of Nations. Princeton University Press, 2012.
- Hans-Bernd Schäfer and Hein Kötz. Judex oeconomicus. 12 höchstrichterliche Entscheidungen, kommentiert aus ökonomischer Sicht. Mohr Siebeck, Tübingen 2003.
- Hans-Bernd Schäfer and Robert Cooter: Solomon’s Knot: How Law Can End the Poverty of Nations

== Education ==
- Diplom-Volkswirt, University of Cologne (1967)
- Dr. disc. oec., University of Bochum (1970)
