= Beria Onger =

Turkish feminist activist and writer

Bakiye Beria Onger
- Born: 1921; Çanakkale, Ottoman Empire
- Died: February 13, 2015 (aged 93); Istanbul
- Education: Ankara University, Law School
- Title: President of the Progressive Women's Organization of Turkey
- Term: 1975–1979
- Political party: Communist Party of Turkey

Bakiye Beria Onger (1921 – February 13, 2015) was a Turkish feminist activist and writer, a pioneer of the progressive women's movement in Turkey. She led the Progressive Women's Organization of Turkey until it was banned ahead of the 1980 coup. Onger also ran for Senate as a member of the Communist Party of Turkey in 1979.

== Early life and education ==
Beria Onger was born Bakiye Beria Hanım in Çanakkale, Ottoman Empire, in 1921.

She studied to become a lawyer at Ankara University, Law School, graduating in 1941. She worked as a government civil servant, then began practicing law independently in 1957.

== Activism ==
Onger founded a small organization of women activists in 1965. Then, in 1975, she became the founding president of İlerici Kadınlar Derneği, the Progressive Women's Organization of Turkey, which fought for women's democratic and economic rights.

She also worked as a journalist, publishing articles in defense of women's rights in the newspaper Cumhuriyet and trade union magazines, including Akşam during the years when it was owned by the Confederation of Turkish Trade Unions. She also owned the newspaper that was the official organ of the Progressive Women's Organization, Kadınların Sesi (Women's Voice). Onger published several books and booklets on the liberation of women in Turkey.

She ran the Progressive Women's Organization until it was shut down by the government in 1979.

Onger was also a founding director of the Peace Association of Turkey, which operated from 1977 until it was banned in 1980.

In the 1979 elections, she ran for a seat in the Senate of the Republic as an independent candidate affiliated with the Communist Party of Turkey. She received 22,000 votes in Istanbul but was not elected.

She was forced to flee abroad after the 1980 Turkish coup d'état, but later returned to Turkey.

== Personal life ==
Onger was married to the writer and critic Fahir Onger from 1946 until his death in 1971. The couple had two children.

She died in Istanbul in 2015 and is buried at Zincirlikuyu Cemetery.
