= European Journal of Law and Economics =

- Discipline: Law and economics
- Language: English
- Edited by: Jürgen G. Backhaus

Publication details
- History: 1994-present
- Publisher: Springer Science+Business Media
- Frequency: Bimonthly
- Impact factor: 0.481 (2016)

Standard abbreviations
- ISO 4: Eur. J. Law Econ.

Indexing
- ISSN: 0929-1261
- LCCN: 97652920
- OCLC no.: 890314336

Links
- Journal homepage; Online archive

The European Journal of Law and Economics is a bimonthly peer-reviewed academic journal covering law and economics. with a focus on European countries. It was established in 1994 and is published by Springer Science+Business Media. The editor-in-chief is Jürgen G. Backhaus (University of Erfurt).

According to the Journal Citation Reports, the journal had a 2016 impact factor of 0.481. Its 2024 impact factor was 1.1.
