= Big Brother Türkiye =

- Presented by: Asuman Krause
- No. of days: 101
- No. of contestants: 17
- Winner: Sinan Aydemir
- Runner-up: Arsel Şentürk

Release
- Original network: Star TV
- Original release: 28 November 2015 – 7 March 2016

Big Brother Türkiye is the Turkish adaptation of the Dutch television competition format Big Brother. Presented by Asuman Krause. The first season of the program, produced by Endemol Shine Turkey and music composed by Murat Ezber, started to be broadcast on Star TV on November 28, 2015. The prize of the first season was 1,000,000 TL.

The winner of the first season is Sinan Aydemir.

The House was located at the Area of the Marma Convention Center in Maltepe.

== Schedule ==
Monday	Tuesday	Wednesday	Thursday	Friday	Saturday	Sunday
Morning Highlights Shows (09:45am–11:00am); Evening Highlights Shows (YouTube: 11:30pm–12:30am; TV: 02:15am–03:30am); Nightly Live Special (03:30am–04:45am)					Evening Highlights Shows (YouTube: 11:30pm–12:30am; TV: 02:15am–03:30am); Nightly Live Special (03:30am–04:45am)	Weekly Finale (10:00pm–01:00am)

== Housemates ==
On Day 1, sixteen housemates entered the House.

Name	Age	Occupation	Residence	Day entered	Day exited	Status
Sinan Aydemir	20	Student	Şırnak	1	101	Winner
Arsel Şentürk	27	Manager	Paris, France	1	101	Runner-up
Onur Aydemir	20	Student	Bursa	1	101	3rd Place
İdil Naz Kaluç	20	Student	Sivas	1	101	4th Place
Seda Gümüşçü	29	Cosmetic sales manager	Diyarbakır	71	92	15th Evicted
Seda Gümüşçü	29	Cosmetic sales manager	Diyarbakır	1	57	9th Evicted
Gökçen Yurt	30	Fitness trainer	Aydın	1	92	14th Evicted
Rezan Denizmen	37	Organizer	Istanbul	1	92	13th Evicted
Yasin Özegemen	26	Actor	Konya	71	85	12th Evicted
Yasin Özegemen	26	Actor	Konya	1	22	3rd Evicted
Hüseyin Kantarcı	33	Truck driver	Kastamonu	1	78	11th Evicted
Alphan Yuvalı	21	Student	Istanbul	50	64	10th Evicted
Alphan Yuvalı	21	Student	Istanbul	1	8	1st Evicted
Funda Güven	31	Teacher	Çanakkale	1	57	8th Evicted
Emrah Karakaş	30	Model	Tekirdağ	27	50	7th Evicted
Çağla Çoban	33	Swimming coach	Tekirdağ	1	43	6th Evicted
Demir Kırılmaz	42	Foreign trade expert	Erzurum	1	36	5th Evicted
Tuğra Özer	19	Footballer	Ardahan	1	29	4th Evicted
Oktay Yavuzarslan	35	National sportsman	Ankara	1	26	Walked
Gülşen Dinçer	26	Fashion designer	Malatya	1	15	2nd Evicted

== Nominations table ==
	Week 1	Week 2	Week 3	Week 4	Week 5	Week 6	Week 7	Week 8	Week 9	Week 10	Week 11	Week 12	Week 13	Week 14 Final	Nominations received
Sinan	~~İdil,~~; ~~Gülşen~~	Gökçen, İdil	İdil, Gökçen	İdil, Arsel	Çağla, Gökçen	Gökçen, Çağla	Gökçen, Seda	Hüseyin, Funda	Gökçen, Rezan	No nominations	Gökçen, Rezan	Gökçen, Seda	No nominations	Winner (Day 101)	12
Arsel	~~Tuğra,~~; ~~Gülşen~~	Gülşen, Tuğra	Gökçen, Sinan	Onur, Tuğra	Çağla, Gökçen	Gökçen, Emrah	Gökçen, Emrah	Funda, Sinan	Alphan, Onur	No nominations	Rezan, Onur	Seda, Yasin	No nominations	Runner-up (Day 101)	2
Onur	~~Yasin,~~; ~~Tuğra~~	Gökçen, İdil	İdil, Gökçen	İdil, Gökçen	Gökçen, Çağla	Çağla, Gökçen	Gökçen, Seda	Hüseyin, İdil	Rezan, Gökçen	No nominations	Rezan, Gökçen	Gökçen, Rezan	No nominations	Third place (Day 101)	19
İdil	~~Onur,~~; ~~Seda~~	Onur, Gülşen	Gökçen, Seda	Hüseyin, Onur	Onur, Sinan	Çağla, Emrah	Emrah, Onur	Funda, Hüseyin	Alphan, Sinan	No nominations	Onur, Hüseyin	Seda, Yasin	No nominations	Fourth place (Day 101)	12
Seda	~~Rezan,~~; ~~İdil~~	Gökçen, Çağla	Çağla, Rezan	Rezan, Tuğra	Çağla, Onur	Çağla, Emrah	Rezan, Hüseyin	Sinan, Hüseyin	Evicted (Day 57)		Exempt	Yasin, Gökçen	No nominations	Re-evicted (Day 92)	12
Gökçen	~~Hüseyin,~~; ~~Onur~~	Gülşen, Funda	Rezan, Yasin	Rezan, Tuğra	Onur, Çağla	Hüseyin, Funda	Arsel, Hüseyin	Hüseyin, Funda	Hüseyin, Sinan	No nominations	Onur, Hüseyin	Onur, Sinan	No nominations	Evicted (Day 92)	65
Rezan	~~Funda,~~; ~~Çağla~~	Çağla, Gülşen	Gökçen, Oktay	Hüseyin, Gökçen	Çağla, Funda	Çağla, Funda	Hüseyin, Emrah	Funda, Hüseyin	Hüseyin, Sinan	No nominations	Gökçen, İdil	Sinan, Seda	No nominations	Evicted (Day 92)	20
Yasin	~~Onur,~~; ~~Funda~~	Oktay, Onur	Oktay, Seda	Evicted (Day 22)							Exempt	Seda, Sinan	Re-evicted (Day 85)		14
Hüseyin	~~Funda,~~; ~~Gülşen~~	Gökçen, Onur	Gökçen, İdil	Rezan, İdil	Gökçen, Çağla	Gökçen, Çağla	Gökçen, Rezan	Sinan, Funda	Rezan, Gökçen	No nominations	Gökçen, Rezan	Evicted (Day 78)			18
Alphan	~~Yasin,~~; ~~Tuğra~~	Evicted (Day 8)						Exempt	Rezan, Gökçen	Re-evicted (Day 64)					3
Funda	~~Yasin,~~; ~~Rezan~~	Gökçen, Oktay	Gökçen, Oktay	Tuğra, Gökçen	Gökçen, Demir	Emrah, Gökçen	Rezan, Gökçen	Sinan, Hüseyin	Evicted (Day 57)						14
Emrah	Not in House				Exempt	Gökçen, Rezan	Gökçen, Rezan	Evicted (Day 50)							7
Çağla	~~Yasin,~~; ~~Rezan~~	Gökçen, Yasin	Tuğra, Seda	Tuğra, Rezan	Demir, Onur	Seda, Rezan	Evicted (Day 43)								20
Demir	~~Onur,~~; ~~Hüseyin~~	Onur, Oktay	Oktay, Hüseyin	Gökçen, Onur	Çağla, Gökçen	Evicted (Day 36)									4
Tuğra	~~Onur,~~; ~~Alphan~~	Gökçen, Yasin	Yasin, Çağla	Funda, Seda	Evicted (Day 29)										9
Oktay	~~Demir,~~; ~~Yasin~~	Gökçen, Yasin	Yasin, İdil	Walked (Day 26)											7
Gülşen	~~Çağla,~~; ~~Demir~~	Gökçen, Rezan	Evicted (Day 15)												4
Notes	1, 2, 3	4	5	6	none	7	none	8, 9	10	11, 12, 13	none	14	none	15	
Head of House	Oktay	Sinan	Funda	Sinan	Rezan	İdil	Sinan	Onur	Arsel	İdil	Sinan	Arsel	Sinan	none	
Against public vote	Alphan, Gökçen, ~~Funda,~~; Onur, ~~Sinan,~~; ~~Yasin~~	Gökçen, Gülşen, ~~Oktay,~~; Onur	Gökçen, İdil, ~~Oktay,~~; Yasin	Gökçen, ~~İdil,~~; Rezan, Tuğra	~~Çağla,~~; Demir, Gökçen, Onur	Çağla, ~~Emrah,~~; Funda, Gökçen	Emrah, Gökçen, Hüseyin, Rezan	Funda, Gökçen, Rezan, Seda	Alphan, Gökçen, Rezan, Sinan	~~Arsel,~~; ~~Gökçen,~~; ~~Onur,~~; ~~Sinan~~	Gökçen, Hüseyin, Onur, Rezan	Gökçen, Seda, Sinan, Yasin	Gökçen, İdil, Rezan, Seda	Arsel, Onur, Sinan, İdil	
Immunity Winner	Sinan	Oktay	Oktay	İdil	Çağla	Emrah	none								
Walked	none			Oktay	none										
Evicted	Alphan; 29% to save	Gülşen; 10% to save	Yasin; 19% to save	Tuğra; 24% to save	Demir; 15% to save	Çağla; 15% to save	Alphan; Onur's choice to return	Seda; 8 of 10 votes to evict	Alphan; 8% to save	Seda; 30% to return	Hüseyin; 9% to save	Yasin; 11% to save	Rezan; 19% to be finalist	İdil; 6% to win	
Evicted	Alphan; 29% to save	Gülşen; 10% to save	Yasin; 19% to save	Tuğra; 24% to save	Demir; 15% to save	Çağla; 15% to save	Alphan; Onur's choice to return	Seda; 8 of 10 votes to evict	Alphan; 8% to save	Seda; 30% to return	Hüseyin; 9% to save	Yasin; 11% to save	Gökçen; 21% to be finalist	Onur; 9% to win	
Evicted	Alphan; 29% to save	Gülşen; 10% to save	Yasin; 19% to save	Tuğra; 24% to save	Demir; 15% to save	Çağla; 15% to save	Emrah; 14% to save	Funda; 10% to save	Alphan; 8% to save	Yasin; 26% to return	Hüseyin; 9% to save	Yasin; 11% to save	Gökçen; 21% to be finalist	Onur; 9% to win	
Evicted	Alphan; 29% to save	Gülşen; 10% to save	Yasin; 19% to save	Tuğra; 24% to save	Demir; 15% to save	Çağla; 15% to save	Emrah; 14% to save	Funda; 10% to save	Alphan; 8% to save	Yasin; 26% to return	Hüseyin; 9% to save	Yasin; 11% to save	Seda; 29% to be finalist	Arsel; 21% to win	
Saved	Gökçen; 38% Onur; 33%	Onur; 74% Gökçen; 16%	Gökçen; 49% İdil; 32%	Gökçen; 50% Rezan; 26%	Onur; 55% Gökçen; 30%	Gökçen; 66% Funda; 19%	Rezan; 35% Gökçen; 34% Hüseyin; 17%	Rezan; 71% Gökçen; 19%	Sinan; 52% Gökçen; 23% Rezan; 17%	No eviction	Onur; 36% Rezan; 28% Gökçen; 27%	Sinan; 33% Seda; 32% Gökçen; 24%	İdil; 31% to be finalist	Sinan; 64% to win	

=== Notes ===
This housemate were the current Head of House.
This housemate were given or won immunity for that week.
This housemate were automatically put up for eviction by Big Brother.

- ^Note 1: Because Oktay became Head of House, he had to choose 3 people. Bad or good things could happen to them. He picked Gökçen, Arsel and Onur respectively. Arsel became nominated for the eviction, Gökçen won immunity for that week and Onur had to stay in the lantern for 6 hours.
- ^Note 2: There was a tie between Funda, Gülşen, Rezan and Tuğra. As a Head of House, Oktay had to pick a nominee from those names and he picked Funda.
- ^Note 3: Because Alphan, Onur, Sinan broke the rules, they received the automatic nomination. Funda and Yasin's nominations are canceled.
- ^Note 4: There was a tie between Oktay and Yasin. As a Head of House, Sinan had to pick a nominee from those names and he picked Oktay.
- ^Note 5: There was a tie between Seda and Yasin. As a Head of House, Funda had to pick a nominee from those names and she picked Yasin.
- ^Note 6: There was a tie between İdil and Onur. As a Head of House, Sinan had to pick a nominee from those names and he picked İdil.
- ^Note 7: There was a tie between Funda and Rezan. As a Head of House, İdil had to pick a nominee from those names and she picked Funda.
- ^Note 8: On Day 50, a fortune's wheel appeared in the Big Brother house. Each housemate had to spin one time, Sinan and Hüseyin could pick someone to be the new Head of House and they picked Onur, İdil and Seda could put someone to the nomination, İdil picked Seda and Seda picked Rezan, Rezan could make someone immune for the upcoming week and she picked Gökçen, Funda and Onur could bring one of the evicted housemates back, Funda wanted Çağla to return but later Onur wanted Alphan to return to the house and Alphan returned to the house.
- ^Note 9: On Day 57, the housemates voted for the one who they want to leave the house. Seda voted Alphan, Rezan voted Funda and the rest of the housemates voted Seda. She left the house immediately.
- ^Note 10: There was a tie between Alphan and Hüseyin. As a Head of House, Arsel had to pick a nominee from those names and he picked Alphan.
- ^Note 11: In Week 9, Alphan, Hüseyin, Onur and Sinan made an alliance to evict Rezan. This caused them to be put up for eviction and Big Brother granted Rezan immunity.
- ^Note 12: Arsel gave up on the Head of House competition on purpose to let İdil win and İdil became HoH. This caused him to be put up for eviction.
- ^Note 13: Seda got the most votes (30%) in the public voting for a Housemate to return to the House. Afterwards, Yasin, who became second in the public voting also returned to the house.
- ^Note 14: On Day 85, after Yasin's eviction, housemates voted to select the first finalist of the season. There was a tie between Arsel (2) and Onur (2), housemates voted between them. By a vote of 3-2, Arsel became the first finalist of the season. Later, Sinan became the second finalist by won the competition.
- ^Note 15: This week the public were voting to win, rather than to save.
