= Robert Cooter =

American economist and legal scholar (1945–2025)

Robert D. Cooter
- Born: May 2, 1945
- Died: September 8, 2025 (aged 80)

Academic background
- Education: Harvard University (Ph.D.); Oxford University (M.A.) Swarthmore College (B.A.)

Academic work
- Discipline: Private law, constitutional law and economics, law and economic development
- School or tradition: Law and Economics
- Institutions: University of California, Berkeley, School of Law

Robert D. Cooter (May 2, 1945 – September 8, 2025) was an American economist and legal scholar who was the Herman F. Selvin Professor of Law at the University of California, Berkeley, School of Law.

Cooter worked in the field of law and economics. He was co-editor of the International Review of Law and Economics, and was among those convened by George Mason University Law School dean, Henry Manne, in January, 1990, to discuss organizing a professional association, prior to formation of the American Law and Economics Association; Cooter was subsequently elected as a founding board member, then served as its president for 1994. In 1999 he was elected to the American Academy of Arts and Sciences.

"Not the Power to Destroy: An Effects Theory of the Tax Power," a paper Cooter coauthored with Neil S. Siegel (Duke Law professor), provided the legal framework for the Supreme Court ruling on the Affordable Care Act in 2012.

== Background ==
Cooter was born on May 2, 1945. He was married and had three grown children with his wife Blair. He graduated from Swarthmore College in 1967 and attended Oxford University as a Fulbright Scholar from 1967 to 1969, graduating with a degree in philosophy, politics, and economics. He earned a Ph.D. in economics from Harvard University in 1975. Cooter was the 2018 recipient of the Ronald H. Coase medal recognizing his contributions to the fields of law and economics.

Cooter died on September 8, 2025, at the age of 80.

== Academic career ==
Cooter began teaching in the Department of Economics at University of California, Berkeley in 1975, joining the Berkeley Law faculty in 1980. He was a visiting member of the Institute for Advanced Study in Princeton and a recipient of various awards and fellowships, including Guggenheim, the Jack N. Pritzker Visiting Research Professorship at Northwestern Law School, and the Max Planck Research Prize. He was an Olin visiting professor at the University of Virginia School of Law and lectured at the University of Cologne in 1989.

== Research and publications ==
His publications included the sixth edition of the textbook "Law and Economics" (co-authored with Thomas Ulen), and "Solomon's Knot: How Law Can End the Poverty of Nations" (co-authored with Hans-Bernd Schäfer).

Books

- Robert D. Cooter and Hans-Bernd Schäfer. Solomon's Knot: How Law Can End the Poverty of Nations. Princeton University Press, 2012.
- Robert D. Cooter and Thomas Ulen. Law and Economics. Pearson Series in Economics, 6th edition, 2012.

Selected Articles

- Robert D. Cooter. "Maturing into Normal Science: The Effect of Empirical Legal Studies on Law and Economics," University of Illinois Law Review, October 2011, Number 5, page 1475.
- Robert D. Cooter and Michael D. Gilbert. "A Theory of Direct Democracy and the Single Subject Rule" A Theory of Direct Democracy and the Single Subject Rule 110 (2010): 687.
- Robert D. Cooter and Brian Broughman. "Charity and Information: Correcting the Failure of a Disjunctive Social Norm" Michigan Journal of Law Reform 43 (2010): 871.
- Robert D. Cooter and Neil Siegel. "Collective Action Federalism: A General Theory of Article I, Section 8" Stanford Law Review 63 (2010): 115–185.

In October 2012, Cooter delivered the keynote address at the Eighth Annual Friedrich A. von Hayek Lecture, "Freedom, Innovation, and Intellectual Property," sponsored by the New York University Journal of Law and Liberty.

== Non-academic projects ==
In 1999 Cooter joined two U.C. Berkeley economics professors, Aaron Edlin and Benjamin Hermalin, to create the online publishing platform called Berkeley Electronic Press, or Bepress. The current portfolio of Bepress includes ten peer-reviewed electronic journals, a platform called SelectedWorks for academics to create online professional pages, and the online law review paid submission program ExpressO.

== Education ==
- B.A., Swarthmore College (1967)
- M.A., Oxford University (1969)
- Ph.D., Harvard University (1975)
