= Fikret Otyam =

Turkish journalist, writer and painter

- Born: December 19, 1926; Aksaray, Aksaray Province, Turkey
- Died: August 9, 2015 (aged 88); Antalya, Turkey
- Resting place: Hacıbektaş, Nevşehir
- Education: Arts
- Alma mater: Academy of Fine Arts in Istanbul
- Occupations: Painter, journalist
- Spouse: Filiz Otyam (married 1977)

Fikret Otyam (December 19, 1926 – August 9, 2015) was a Turkish painter and journalist.

He was born in Aksaray, where his father was running a pharmacy store. After attending elementary school in Aksaray, he graduated from İstanbul State Fine Arts Academy, the present-day Mimar Sinan Fine Arts University, where he studied under Bedri Rahmi Eyüboğlu. (1953).

He began his career in journalism before moving to painting and photography. He has worked in Son Saat, Dünya, Akın, Ulus, Kudret and Cumhuriyet newspapers. Recently, he wrote a weekly column for the Aydınlık daily.

He made a name for himself with his series of interviews with ordinary people of southeastern and eastern Turkey. Those interviews were later published as books.

After his retirement in 1979, he moved to his farm in Antalya where he started focusing more on his paintings. His painting style was largely influenced by artists Turgut Zaim, Namık İsmail and Bedri Rahmi Eyüboğlu. Depictions of veiled Anatolian women and goats are two figures that appear frequently in his paintings. After his first exhibition in 1952, Otyam held more than 30 exhibitions in Turkey and abroad, and his works were included in the collections of foreign museums and private collectors.

He died of renal failure at Antalya on August 9, 2015, at the age of 88.
