= Hüseyin Başaran =

Turkish sports commentator

Hüseyin Başaran (1958, Eskişehir Province, Turkey – December 27, 2015, Söğütözü, Turkey) was a Turkish sports commentator.
