= Zeyyat Hatiboğlu =

- Born: March 16, 1925; Trabzon, Turkey
- Died: May 29, 2018 (aged 93)
- Occupations: Professor of Economics and Business

Zeyyat Hatiboğlu (March 16, 1925 - May 29, 2018) was a Turkish professor of economics and business administration at Istanbul Technical University, Istanbul, Turkey. He also served on the board of trustees of Doğuş University.

== Career ==
Hatiboğlu completed elementary school and high school in Trabzon, Turkey, his birthplace. He obtained his BA in economics at Istanbul University in 1946 and his Ph.D. in economics at Istanbul University in 1950. He became an assistant professor at Istanbul Technical University and became an associate professor in 1952 and a full professor in 1962. He completed post-doctoral studies at Harvard Business School in 1955 and at London School of Economics in 1964.

He was a founding member of Istanbul University, Institute of Management and Istanbul Technical University, Management Engineering Faculty (1978). He served as the dean of the faculty until 1983. In addition to serving as a consultant and board member at various institutions, he also worked as the dean of Business Administration Faculty of Bahrein University between 1983 and 1985. He continued to serve as a member of board of trustees of Doğuş University since its inception in 1997.

== Publications ==
Zeyyat Hatiboğlu has over 200 books, of which more than 30 are in English. He covers a wide range of topics, including macroeconomics, economic growth, Turkish economy, commerce, finance, marketing and accounting. The Library of Congress houses 30 of his books.

His cornerstone work is "An Unconventional Analysis of the Turkish Economy", in which he describes an alternative system for describing economic growth and other macroeconomic parameters.

A list of selected publications:

- İktisat Bilimi ve Türkiye İktisadı (The Science of Economics and the Turkish Economy) (10 volumes).
- The filling of the gaps and correction of inadequate analyses in introductory and intermediate textbooks on the princinples of economics (2 volumes)
