= Osman Necmi Gürmen =

Turkish novelist (1927–2015)

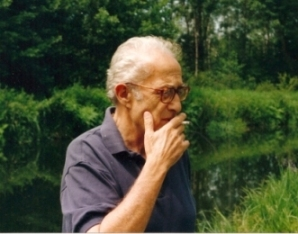
Osman Gürmen Portrait

Osman Necmi Gürmen (1927 – 29 June 2015) was a Turkish novelist. Gürmen was careful to use historical sources for his historical novels.

== Career ==
His first novel was written in French, L'echarpe d'iris, was published in France in 1976, by Éditions Gallimard. The book was published in Turkish by Hürriyet Books in 1977, under the name Ebem Kuşağı. Gürmen's second novel, Kılıç Uykuda Vurulur, was written in Turkish, and published by Hürriyet Books in 1978. The novel was translated into French in 1979, and was published in France by Gallimard under the title L'espadon. The book was translated to Norwegian in 1981 and was published with the title Sverdfisken by Aschehoug.

After a break, Gürmen started working on Le Renegat in French at the beginning of the 1990s. The work, being very large, could not be published. Later on, the author decided to rewrite the book, again in French due to the sources used, and brought the content to a manageable size. The book was published with the title Mühtedi, in Turkish, in 2007. His fourth novel, Râna, was published in 2006, prior to Le Renegat. Râna was on the Turkish best-seller charts for over 6 months.
