= Fikri Alican =

Turkish scientist and physician (1929-2015)

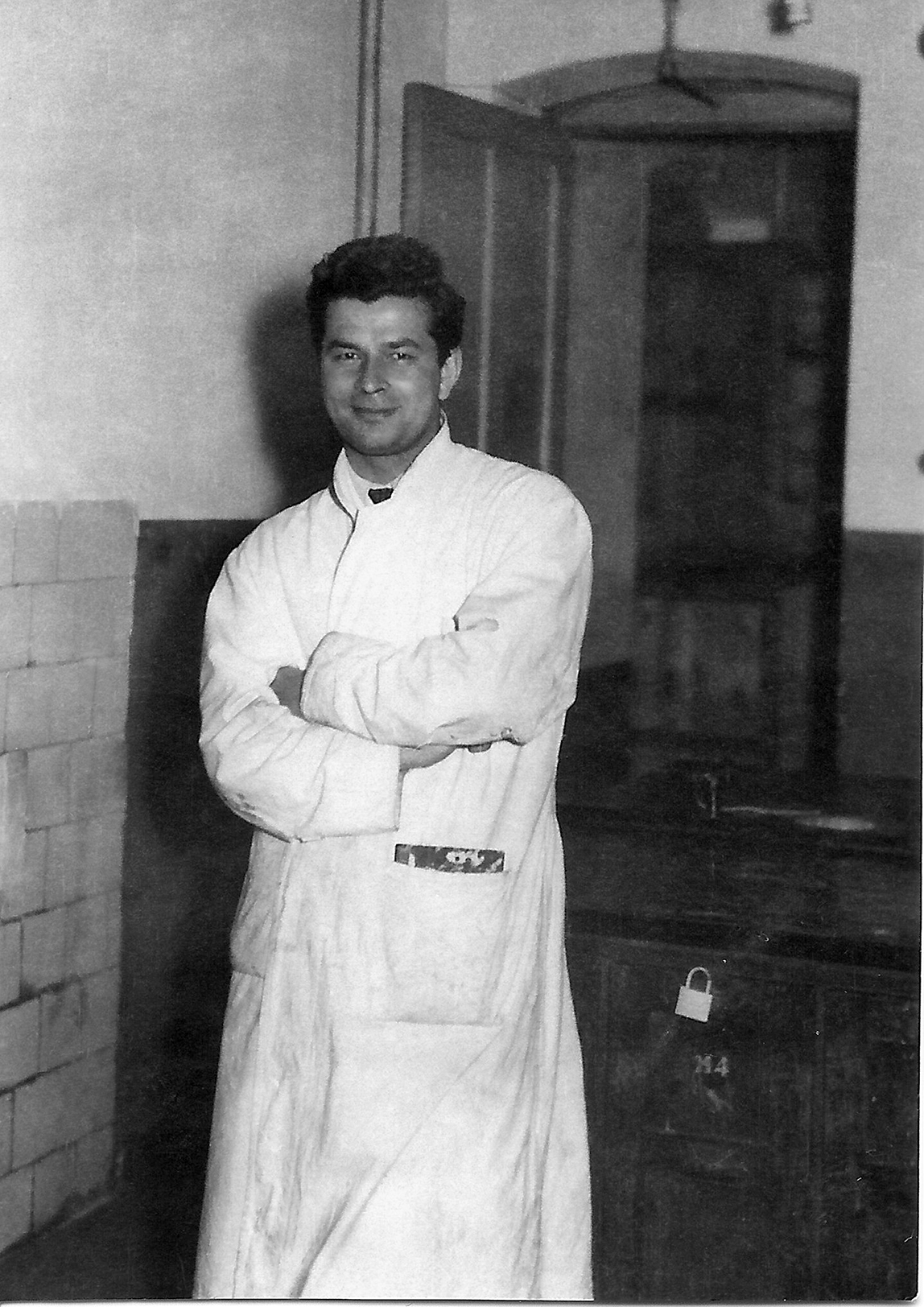
- Fikri Alican (age 26) in May 1955
- Born: 2 April 1929; Adapazarı, Sakarya, Turkey
- Died: 19 August 2015 (aged 86); Istanbul, Turkey
- Resting place: Adapazarı, Sakarya, Turkey
- Education: Robert College (B.S., 1949); Istanbul University (M.D., 1955); University of Mississippi (M.S., 1962)
- Known for: Laboratory and clinical research in the transplantation of the liver, lungs, and small intestines; studies in physiology, most notably in transplantation biology and in the physiology of shock
- Spouse: Halide Alican (1960–2015, his death)
- Children: Necip Fikri Alican; Fuat Varol Alican
- Scientific career
- Fields: Medicine, physiology, general surgery, organ transplantation
- Institutions: Istanbul University; University of Mississippi

Fikri Alican (2 April 1929 – 19 August 2015) was a Turkish scientist and physician with various contributions to medical science, ranging from organ transplantation to physiology. (Note: Alican's official record of birth, 2 April 1930, is off by one year, a relatively common practice at the time by Turkish families hoping to secure, through late declaration of male births, an extra year of growth for their sons prior to conscription (formally at age eighteen).)

== Early life and career ==
Alican was born in Adapazarı, a city in northwestern Turkey, 150 km east of Istanbul. He left his hometown after middle school, attending high school and college in Istanbul, where he graduated from Robert College with a B.S. (1949) and from Istanbul University with an M.D. (1955). (Note: Biographical details are available in Alican's autobiography (2000/2007), cited below in the references and listed above among his publications.) He did his residency at the Istanbul University Medical Center's Clinic of Treatment and Exploratory Surgery, also known as Surgical Clinic #4, headed by Şinasi Hakkı Erel. It is there that he met his future wife, Halide Ihlamur, later Halide Alican, a surgical nurse working at the same clinic.

After completing his residency in general surgery at Istanbul University, his growing interest in the field of organ transplantation, then in its heyday, took him to Jackson, Mississippi, where he joined the University of Mississippi team leading the world in transplantation research, including the first lung transplant (11 June 1963) and the first heart transplant (23 January 1964), under the leadership of James D. Hardy. (Note: The world's first heart transplant into a human was performed by James D. Hardy at the University of Mississippi Medical Center on 23 January 1964. The heart was that of a chimpanzee. As further progress in the United States awaited the resolution of ethical and legal issues in organ transplantation, other countries picked up the pace, and Christiaan Barnard became the first to use a human heart for the procedure, performing the operation in his native South Africa on 3 December 1967.) A few weeks after his arrival there in the summer of 1960, he proposed to Ihlamur, as he always called her, even after she took his name and dropped hers, and they got married in Jackson in November 1960, remaining married for fifty-five years (1960–2015) until his death at age eighty-six. He also obtained a master's degree (M.S., 1962) in physiology at the University of Mississippi, studying with Arthur C. Guyton, while working as a research fellow (soon to become a research associate) in Hardy's department of surgery.

Best known for his work in organ transplantation, though with some notable initiatives in physiology as well, Alican later established a successful private practice as a general surgeon. His professional career was divided between medical research in the United States and private practice in Turkey.

== Main Contributions ==
Alican's main contributions came in the 1960s (1960–1971) when he worked at the University of Mississippi Medical Center (UMMC) in the pioneering days of laboratory research and clinical studies in organ transplantation. His research focused largely on the lungs and on the liver, though he is also known for his work on intestinal transplantation. He performed the first ever simultaneous bilateral lung transplantation in canines, one of many such operations paving the way for the procedure in humans.

His role in the development of surgical techniques in transplantation was complemented by his work in physiology, including transplantation biology in general as well as a particular specialty in the physiology of shock.

Relocating to Istanbul in 1971, he held a professorship in surgery at Istanbul University until 1979, turning to private practice upon the institution of legal and regulatory changes barring academic physicians from working outside the university. At the time of his departure from the University of Mississippi, he was an attending surgeon at the university hospital as well as associate director of the transplantation program there. Twenty years later, he became a founding member ("fellow") of the James D. Hardy Society, established in 1991.

He has published extensively both in English and in Turkish. His journal articles, mostly in English, are almost exclusively in the areas of organ transplantation and physiology. His monographs, all in Turkish, are more diverse, ranging from general surgery to organ transplantation to cancer research and the in-depth study of various other diseases. The division mirrors the transformation of his career from medical research in the United States to general surgery in Turkey.

His autobiography (2000/2007) describes that transformation as coming with a natural obstacle to research: the relative scarcity of institutional resources in Turkey at that time. He notes that this not only held back progress in laboratory and clinical studies but also impeded scholarly initiatives inevitably undermined by the inadequacy of academic libraries. The solution he reports having implemented is the creation and maintenance of his own library, complete with a card catalog, populated with entries from leading medical journals acquired with his own funds. Specifically, he reports having maintained personal subscriptions to twenty-two medical journals for over thirty years. (Note: His autobiography places the duration at twenty-five years. That figure originates in the first edition (2000), never updated in the second edition (2007). The preface to his Genel Cerrahi (2007) gives the current figure as "more than thirty years.") He identifies these periodical holdings, supplemented by the selective acquisition of books on an ongoing but less regular schedule, as the main flow of information for the wall-to-wall card catalog in his office where he would personally enter the bibliographic details of each article in every issue. Alican credits this makeshift system for enabling him to publish a combined total of 3,000 pages on top of his output in the United States. (Note: The combined page count of Alican's medical monographs (close to 5,000 pages) actually exceeds his own estimate of 3,000 pages by more than 60%, which shows that the total he reports is a net figure excluding the 2007 compilation in order to avoid redundancy.)

== Selected publications ==
=== Books ===
Date	Publication
1960	Alican, Fikri (1960). Anesteziyoloji: Ameliyata Hazırlık, Ameliyat, Ameliyat Sonrası [Anesthesiology: Preoperative Preparation, Surgery, Postoperative Care]. 750 Yataklı Çamlıca Askeri Göğüs Hastalıkları Hastenesi Yayınları No. 2. Istanbul: 750 Yataklı Çamlıca Askeri Göğüs Hastalıkları Hastenesi.
1968	Alican, Fikri (1968). Ameliyata Hazırlık, Anestezi, Ameliyat Sonrası Bakımı [Preoperative Preparation, Anesthesia, Postoperative Care]. Istanbul: Kasımpaşa Deniz Hastanesi Yayınevi. (Note: Alican, in his autobiography, identifies this volume (1968) as his first book, adding that he failed to attract attention (from publishers) to it for eight years between its completion in 1960 and its eventual publication in 1968. This suggests that the first two entries listed among his monographs in the corresponding section above may, especially since the two titles are almost identical, at least in meaning, actually refer to the same work, perhaps the first (1960) being a printed manuscript and the second (1960) a proper publication. As against this possibility, the autobiography (2007) comes with a picture of the cover page of the first book (1960), where a publisher is in fact listed, along with a book series and the number of the specific title in that series.)
1968	Alican, Fikri (1968). Transplantasyon Biyolojisi: Hızla Gelişmekte Olan Yeni Bir Bilim [Transplantation Biology: A Rapidly Developing New Science]. Istanbul: İstanbul Üniversitesi Tıp Fakültesi.
1981	Alican, Fikri (1981). Meme Kanseri [Breast Cancer]. Istanbul: Avrupa Tıp Kitapçılık.
1993	Alican, Fikri (1993). Kanser [Cancer]. Istanbul: Avrupa Tıp Kitapçılık. Second, enlarged and updated edition, 1997.
1993	Alican, Fikri (1993). Meme Hastalıkları [Diseases of the Breast]. Istanbul: Avrupa Tıp Kitapçılık.
1993	Alican, Fikri (1993). Transplantasyon [Transplantation]. Istanbul: Avrupa Tıp Kitapçılık.
1994–1995	Alican, Fikri (1994–1995). Cerrahi Dersleri [Lectures in Surgery]. Vol. Three volumes. Istanbul: Dünya Tıp Kitabevi.
1996	Alican, Fikri (1996). Meme Kanseri: Değişen Kavramlar ve Güncel Tedaviler [Breast Cancer: Changing Conceptions and Current Treatments]. Istanbul: Avrupa Tıp Kitapçılık.
2000	Alican, Fikri (2000). Koca Meşe'nin Gölgesi [The Shadow of the Grand Oak]. Istanbul: Doğan Kitap. ISBN 978-9-7567-7047-4. Second, revised and enlarged edition with pictures published by Nobel Tıp Kitabevleri, 2007. ISBN 978-9-7542-0574-9 [Autobiography.]
2007	Alican, Fikri (2007). Genel Cerrahi [General Surgery]. Vol. Two volumes. Istanbul: Nobel Tıp Kitabevleri. ISBN 978-9-7542-0532-9 (vol. 1). ISBN 978-9-7542-0533-6 (vol. 2). [Compilation of the author's previous books on medicine.] (Note: Alican's preface to Genel Cerrahi (2007), appearing in both volumes, introduces the entirety of that work as a compilation of previously published monographs with minor emendations. His tally in the preface is eleven books, counting as separate works both of the two editions of his study on cancer (1993/1997) as well as each volume of his trilogy on surgery (1994–1995), all listed above in the section on his publications.)

=== Articles ===
Date	Publication
1961	Alican, Fikri; Hardy, James D. (December 1961). "Mechanisms of Shock as Reflected in Studies of Lymph of Abdominal Organs". Surgery, Gynecology & Obstetrics. 113: 743–756. ISSN 0039-6087. PMID 13860423.
1961	Alican, Fikri; Hardy, James D. (1961). "Relationship and Significance of the Levels of Direct Bilirubin, Indirect Bilirubin, and Alkaline Phosphatase in Lymph, Blood, and Urine After Ligation of the Common Bile Duct". Surgical Forum. 12: 337–339. ISSN 0071-8041. PMID 13860424.
1961	Hardy, James D.; Alican, Fikri (July 1961). "Ischemic Gangrene without Major Organic Vascular Occlusion: An Enlarging Concept". Surgery. 50 (1): 107–114. ISSN 0039-6060. PMID 13711520.
1962	Alican, Fikri (March 1962). "A Sensitive Method for Recording Lymph Flow: Observations on the Dynamics of Hepatosplanchnic Blood and Lymph". The Journal of Surgical Research. 2 (2): 104–109. doi:10.1016/S0022-4804(62)80004-3. ISSN 0022-4804. PMID 13860425.
1962	Alican, Fikri (August 1962). "Pathophysiology of Endotoxin Shock: Clinical Observations and Experimental Studies". The American Journal of the Medical Sciences. 244 (2): 237–257. doi:10.1097/00000441-196208000-00014. ISSN 0002-9629. PMID 13860426.
1962	Alican, Fikri; Hardy, James D. (August 1962). "Lymphatic Transport of Bile Pigments and Alkaline Phosphatase in Experimental Common Duct Obstruction". Surgery. 52 (2): 366–372. ISSN 0039-6060. PMID 13860422.
1962	Alican, Fikri; Hardy, James D. (1962). "Sympatho-Adrenal System in Endotoxin Shock". Surgical Forum. 13: 8–10. ISSN 0071-8041. PMID 14012021.
1962	Alican, Fikri; Dalton, Jr., Martin L.; Hardy, James D. (June 1962). "Experimental Endotoxin Shock: Circulatory Changes with Emphasis upon Cardiac Function". The American Journal of Surgery. 103 (6): 702–708. doi:10.1016/0002-9610(62)90249-0. ISSN 0002-9610. PMID 13860421.
1963	Alican, Fikri; Hardy, James D. (9 March 1963). "Lung Reimplantation: Effect on Respiratory Pattern and Function". JAMA. 183 (10): 849–853. doi:10.1001/jama.1963.63700100001013. ISSN 0098-7484. PMID 14012020.
1963	Hardy, James D.; Eraslan, Şadan; Dalton, Jr., Martin L.; Alican, Fikri; Turner, Manson Don (May 1963). "Re-Implantation and Homotransplantation of the Lung: Laboratory Studies and Clinical Potential". Annals of Surgery. 157 (5): 707–718. doi:10.1097/00000658-196305000-00005. ISSN 0003-4932. PMC 1466537. PMID 13960767.
1966	Hardy, James D.; Alican, Fikri (1966). "Lung Transplantation". Advances in Surgery. 2: 235–264. ISSN 0065-3411. PMID 5333296.
1967	Alican, Fikri (1967). "Experimental Orthotopic Liver Transplantation: Experience with 150 Dogs". New Istanbul Contribution to Clinical Science. 9 (3): 71–98. ISSN 0028-5447. PMID 16300153.
1967	Alican, Fikri (April 1967). "Köpekte Total Hepatektomiden Sonra Karaciğerin Tekrar Yerine Takılması [Replantation of the Liver in Dogs Following Total Hepatectomy]". Türk Tıp Cemiyeti Mecmuası. 33 (4): 209–226. ISSN 0494-2736. PMID 4863470.
1967	Alican, Fikri (May 1967). "Eksperimantal Karaciğer Homotransplantasyonu [Experimental Liver Homotransplantation]". Türk Tıp Cemiyeti Mecmuası. 33 (5): 296–311. ISSN 0494-2736.
1967	Alican, Fikri; Hardy, James D. (June 1967). "Eksperimantal Akciğer Transplantasyonu: Teknik, Fizyolojik ve İmmünolojik Problemler [Experimental Lung Transplantation: Technical, Physiological and Immunological Problems]". Türk Tıp Cemiyeti Mecmuası. 33 (6): 319–329. ISSN 0494-2736. PMID 4865363.
1967	Alican, Fikri; Hardy, James D. (August 1967). "Replantation of the Liver in Dogs". The Journal of Surgical Research. 7 (8): 368–375. doi:10.1016/0022-4804(67)90080-7. ISSN 0022-4804.
1969	Alican, Fikri; Hardy, James D. (1969). "A Description of the Course of Long-Term Survivors of Dog Liver Replantation". Surgical Forum. 20: 365–367. ISSN 0071-8041. PMID 4910609.
1970	Alican, Fikri (December 1970). "The Present Status of Lung Transplantation". Journal of the Tennessee Medical Association. 63 (12): 1011–1021. ISSN 0040-3318. PMID 5532334.
1970	Alican, Fikri (September 1970). "Surgical Grand Rounds from the University of Mississippi Medical Center". Southern Medical Journal. 63 (9): 1021–1029. doi:10.1097/00007611-197009000-00009. ISSN 0038-4348. PMID 5460095.
1970	Alican, Fikri; Çayırlı, Mukadder; Keith, Virginia (November 1970). "Fibrinolytic Activity Following Experimental Procedures on the Liver". Archives of Surgery. 101 (5): 590–595. doi:10.1001/archsurg.1970.01340290046010. ISSN 0004-0010. PMID 4920972.
1970	Hardy, James D.; Alican, Fikri; Moynihan, Patricia C.; Timmis, Hilary H.; Chavez, Carlos M.; Davis, J. T. Jr.; Anas, Pandeli (September 1970). "A Case of Clinical Lung Allotransplantation". The Journal of Thoracic and Cardiovascular Surgery. 60 (3): 411–426. doi:10.1016/S0022-5223(19)42353-2. ISSN 0022-5223. PMID 4916119.
1970	Şaşmaz, Orhan; Petridis, Ispiro; Alican, Fikri (January 1970). "Hematoma of the Rectus Abdominis Muscle". Archives of Surgery. 100 (1): 8–10. doi:10.1001/archsurg.1970.01340190010004. ISSN 0004-0010. PMID 5409682.
1970	Turner, Manson Don; Alican, Fikri (January–February 1970). "Successful 20-Hour Storage of the Canine Liver by Continuous Hypothermic Perfusion". Cryobiology. 6 (4): 293–301. doi:10.1016/s0011-2240(70)80083-9. ISSN 0011-2240. PMID 4911453.
1971	Alican, Fikri; Hardy, James D.; Çayırlı, Mukadder; Varner, Joseph E.; Moynihan, Patricia C.; Turner, Manson Don; Anas, Pandeli (February 1971). "Intestinal Transplantation: Laboratory Experience and Report of a Clinical Case". The American Journal of Surgery. 121 (2): 150–159. doi:10.1016/0002-9610(71)90092-4. ISSN 0002-9610. PMID 5540665.
1971	Alican, Fikri; Çayırlı, Mukadder; Işın, Erol; Hardy, James D. (22 February 1971). "One-Stage Replantation of Both Lungs in the Dog". JAMA. 215 (8): 1301–1306. doi:10.1001/jama.1971.03180210047009. ISSN 0098-7484. PMID 4929698.
1971	Alican, Fikri; Çayırlı, Mukadder; Işın, Erol; Hardy, James D. (March 1971). "Feasibility of Simultaneous Bilateral Lung Replantation". Transplantation Proceedings. 3 (1): 524–526. ISSN 0041-1345. PMID 4937931.
1971	Alican, Fikri; Çayırlı, Mukadder; Işın, Erol; Hardy, James D. (June 1971). "Surgical Technique of One-Stage Bilateral Lung Reimplantation in the Dog". The Journal of Thoracic and Cardiovascular Surgery. 61 (6): 847–856. doi:10.1016/S0022-5223(19)42146-6. ISSN 0022-5223. PMID 4932558.
1971	Alican, Fikri; Çayırlı, Mukadder; Işın, Erol; Hardy, James D. (July 1971). "Left Lung Replantation with Immediate Right Pulmonary Artery Ligation". Annals of Surgery. 174 (1): 34–43. doi:10.1097/00000658-197107010-00006. ISSN 0003-4932. PMC 1397426. PMID 4933526.
1971	Alican, Fikri; Çayırlı, Mukadder; Keith, Virginia (March 1971). "One-Stage Hepatectomy in the Dog with Restoration of the Vena Cava by End-to-End Anastomosis". Surgery. 69 (3): 427–432. ISSN 0039-6060. PMID 5544895.
1973	Alican, Fikri; Işın, Erol; Cockrell, John V. (February 1973). "One-Stage Allotransplantation of Both Lungs in the Dog". Annals of Surgery. 177 (2): 193–198. doi:10.1097/00000658-197302000-00012. ISSN 0003-4932. PMC 1355563. PMID 4572784.

== Gallery ==
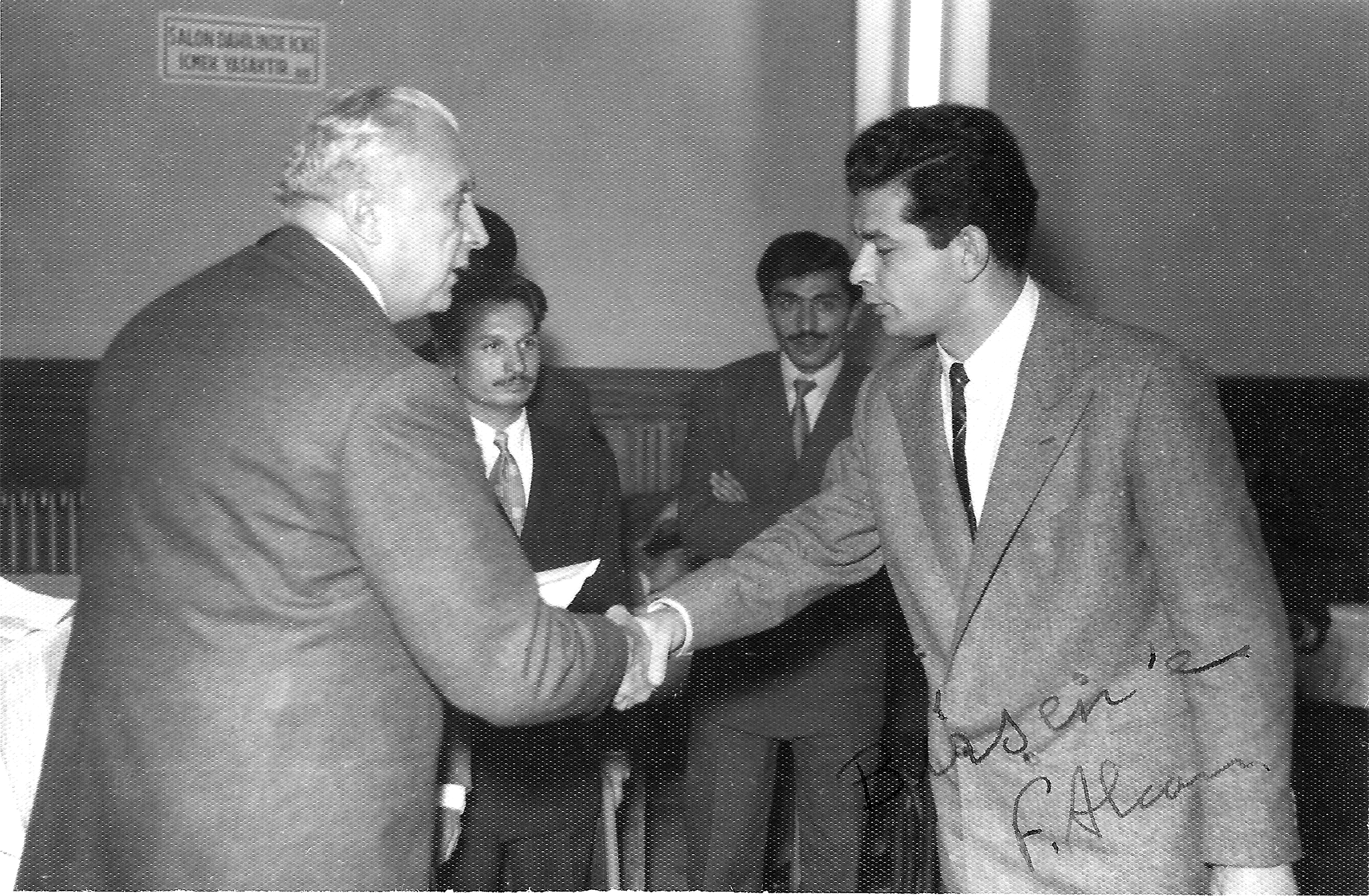
Fikri Alican (age 26) in May 1955 at graduation from medical school (Istanbul University)

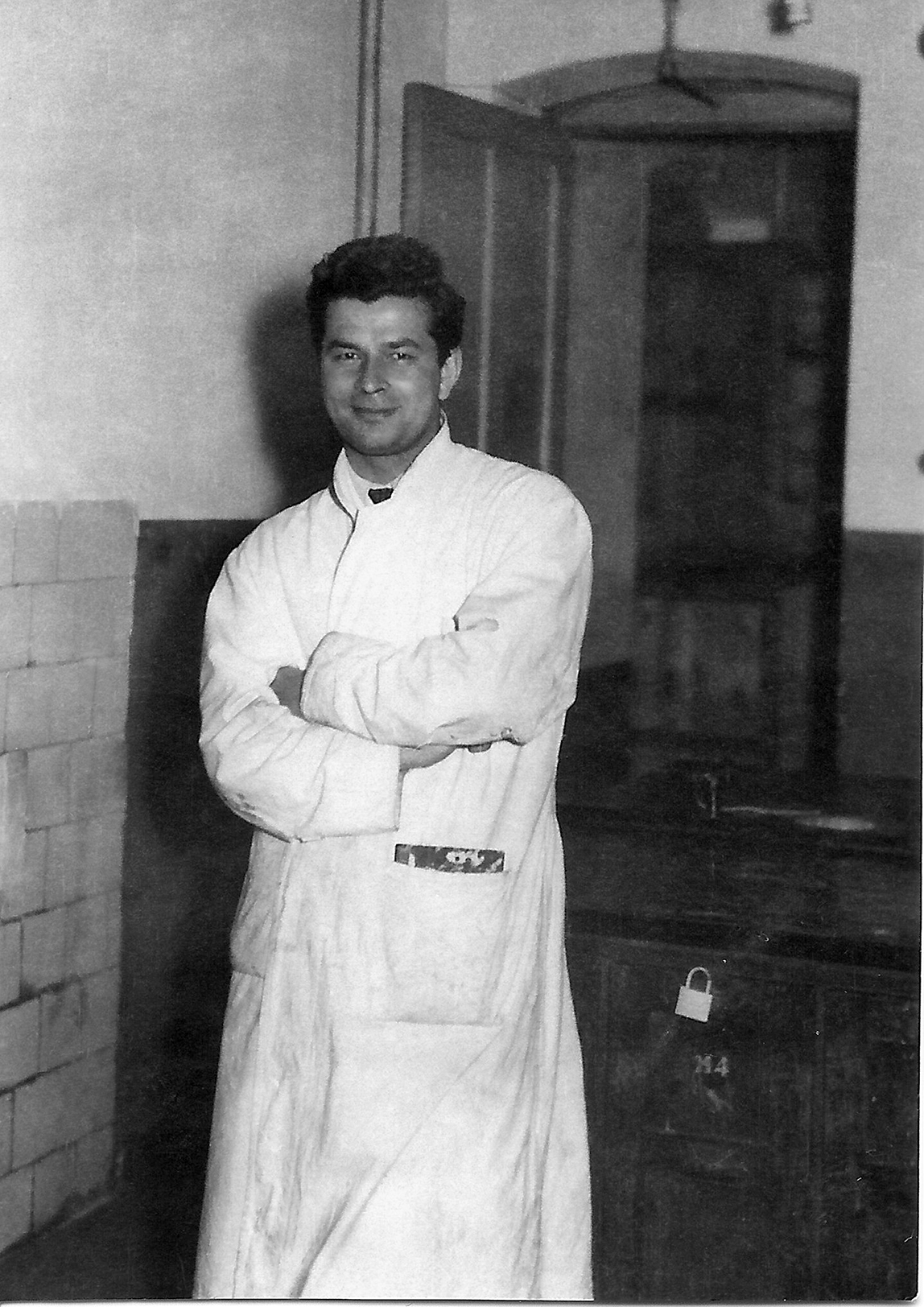
Fikri Alican (age 26) in May 1955 as a young doctor fresh out of medical school (Istanbul University)

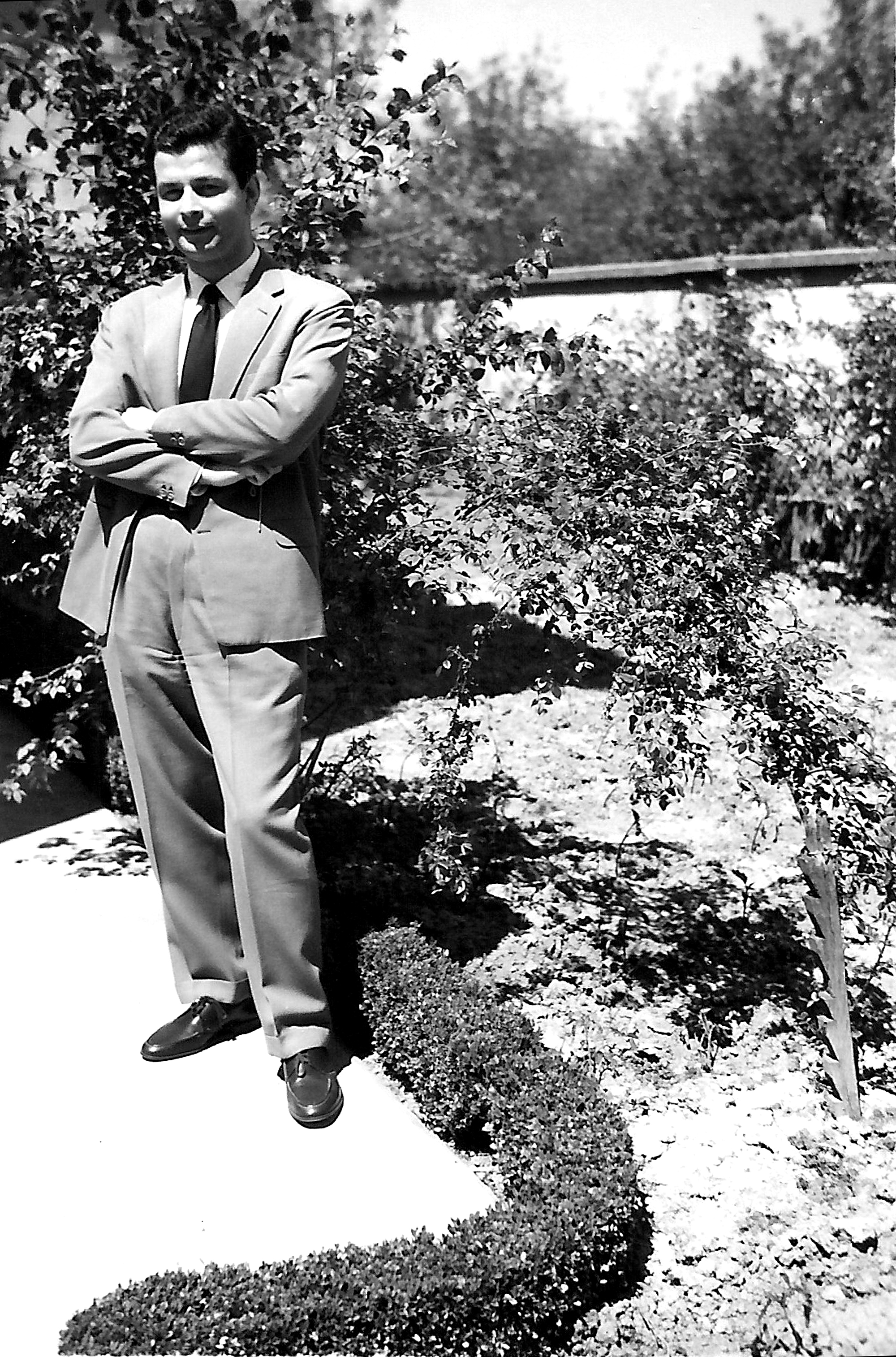
Fikri Alican (age 31) in the summer of 1960 visiting his parents at their home

Fikri Alican (age 40) in July 1969 at a conference on organ transplantation in Madrid

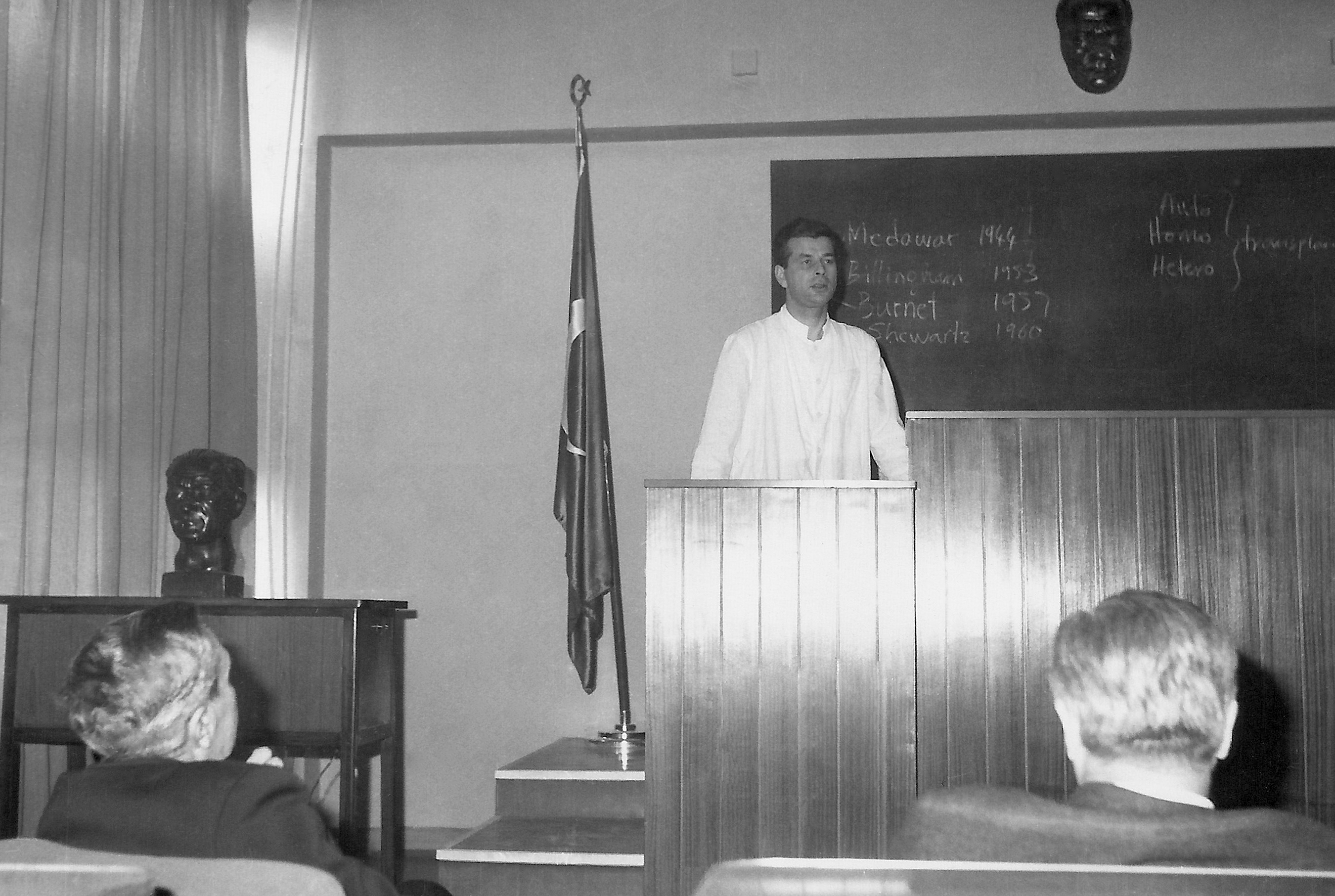
Fikri Alican (age early 40s) in the early 1970s delivering a lecture at Istanbul University

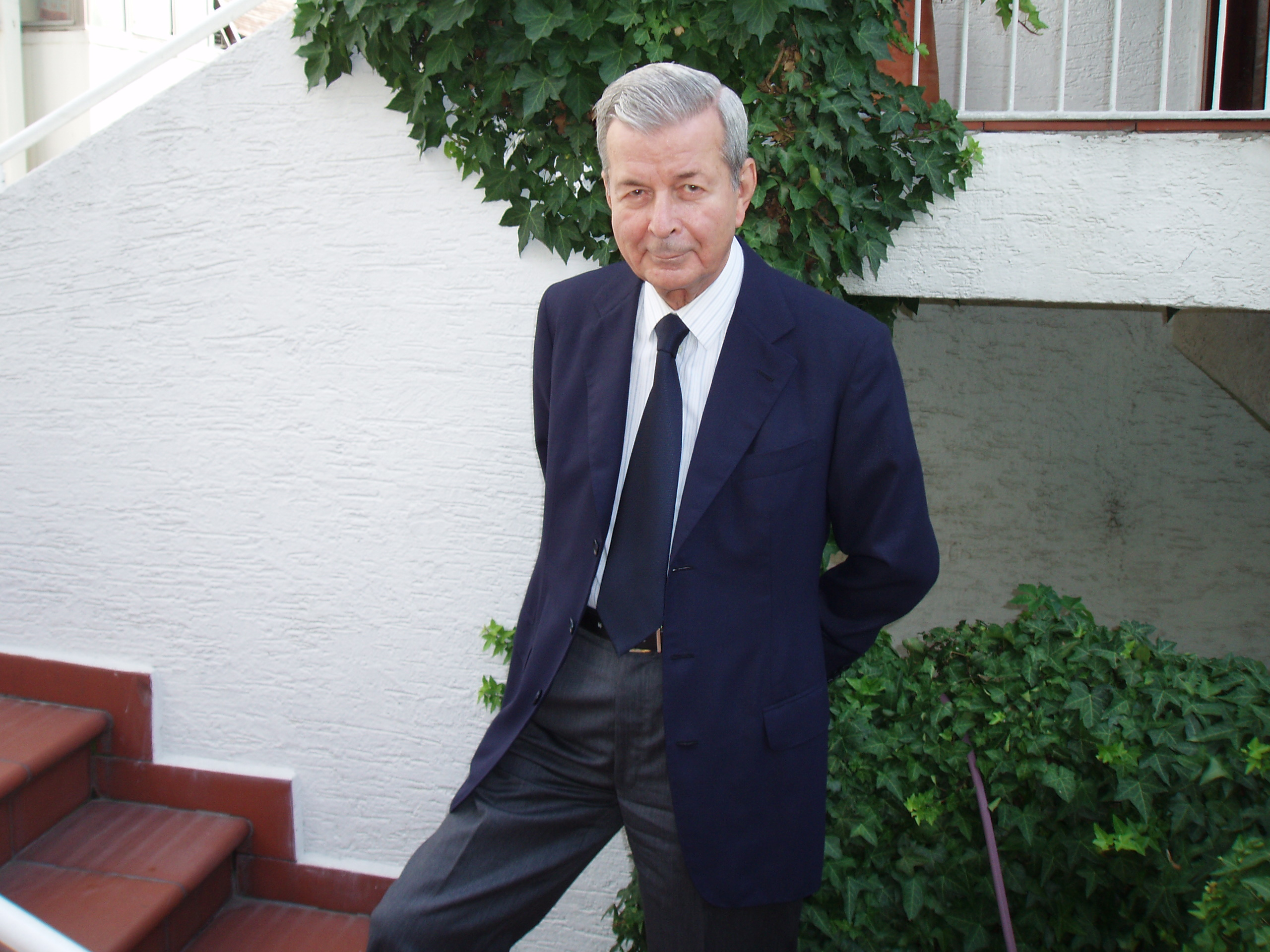
Fikri Alican (age 76) in August 2005 at home

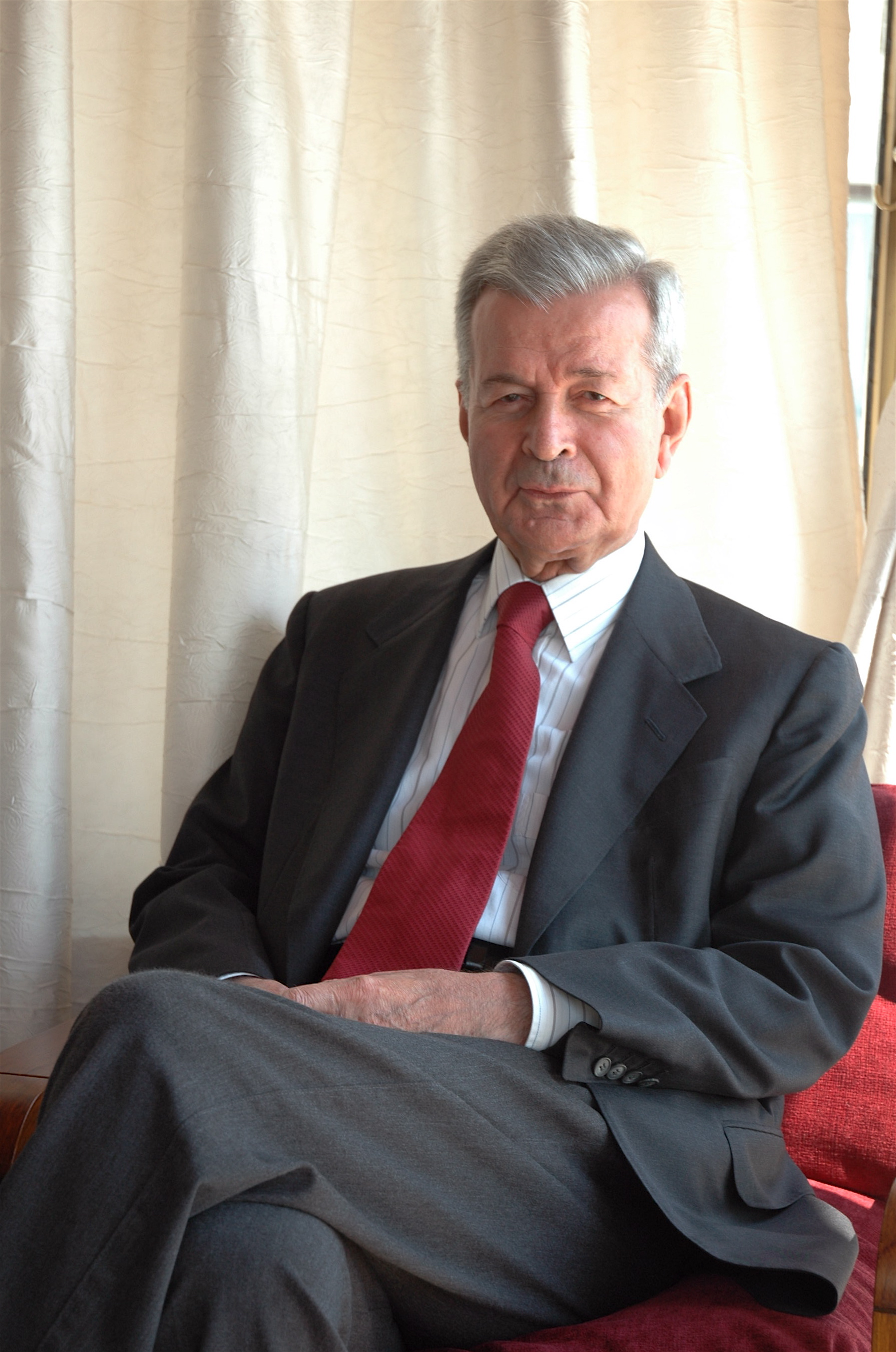
Fikri Alican (age 77) in August 2006 at home

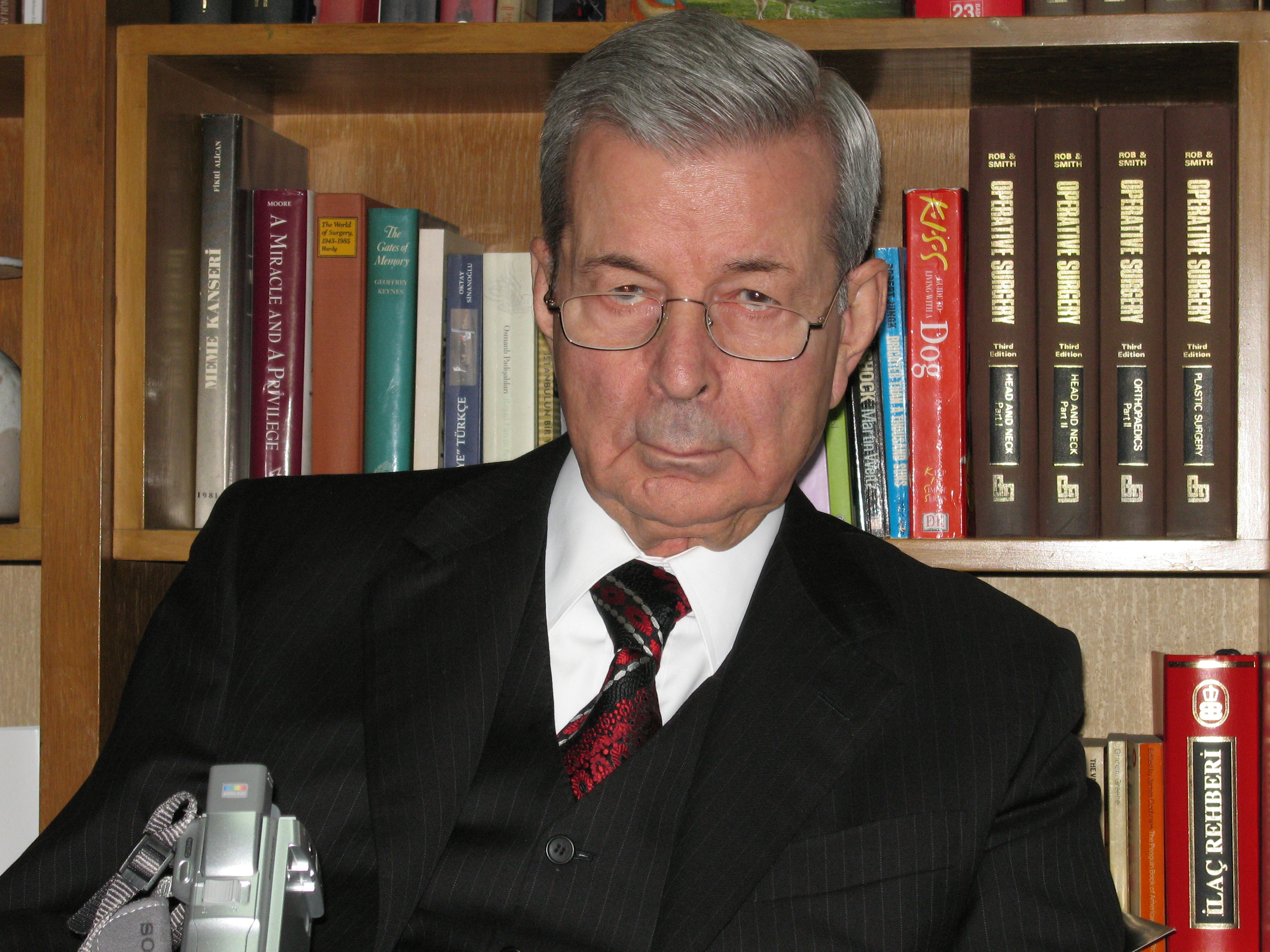
Fikri Alican (age 77) in December 2006 at his office

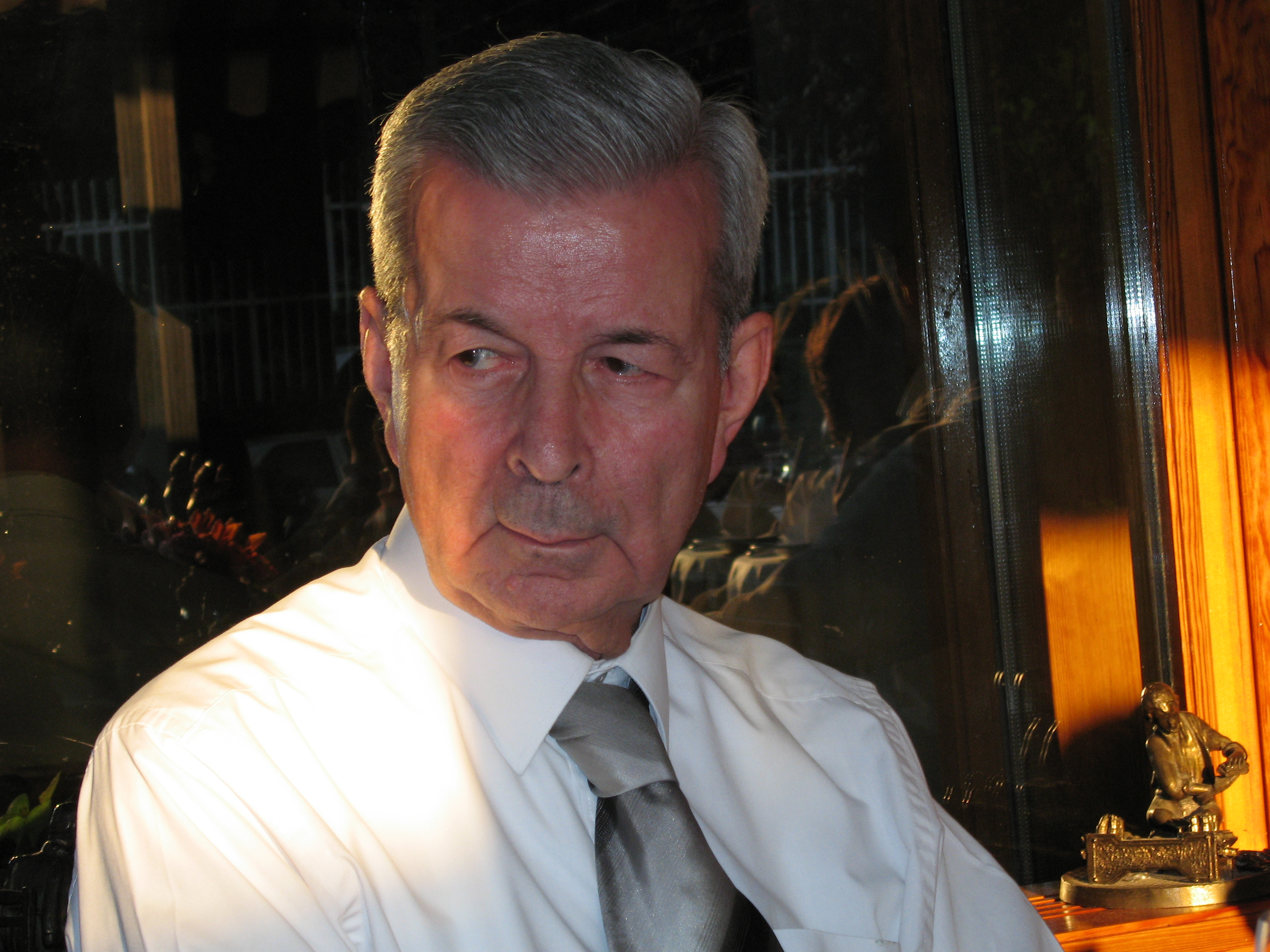
Fikri Alican (age 78) in June 2007 at home
