= The Call to Poetry =

The Call to Poetry was a one-night performance art / international poetry gathering event held April 5, 2012, in Istanbul, near Taksim Square, widely promoted and heavily attended by international poets to celebrate the history of poetry with a dramatic reading of the world’s oldest love poem, which is housed in the Istanbul Archaeology Museums.

The Call to Poetry garnered significant interest in Istanbul, the greater Middle East and the US, as did a portion of the evening dedicated to poetry of the Arab Spring.

== The World's Oldest Love Poem ==
Written on a 4,000-year-old clay tablet known as İstanbul #2461, the Sumerian poem currently has its home at the İstanbul Archaeology Museum and was composed in the 21st century B.C. for the Sumerian king Shu-Sin, who ruled from 2037 to 2029 BC. The poem was intended for a spring fertility ritual and recited by one of his brides.

== Arab Spring Poetry ==
The Call to Poetry featured readings from contemporary Egyptian poet Hesham Al-Gak, a 2011 contestant on the Arab world's popular American Idol-style TV program based in Abu Dhabi called Prince of Poets. During the Egyptian revolution, Al-Gak used the competition to recite poems critical of Egyptian leaders and departed Prince of Poets's Abu Dhabi studios to visit Cairo to compose and recite verse at the height of protests there.

== Event Organizers ==
Call to Poetry organizer, American writer Dan Boylan cited Beat Generation figure Allen Ginsberg as an influence on the evening. Having met Ginsberg as a teenager, Boylan premiered Istanbul-inspired sound poetry during the event, which included music and an over-capacity crowd that listened from outside the venue. American journalist David Trilling served as the first Call to Poetry's master of ceremonies and New Zealand Poet Fred Simpon released his book of verse, “Lucky Me!” during the event.
