= Nazmi Yükselen =

- Born: 1926; Milas, Turkey
- Origin: Milas, Turkey
- Died: 16 March 2015 (aged 88–89) Milas, Turkey
- Genres: Turkish folk music
- Occupation(s): Singer, composer

Nazmi Yükselen (1926 – 16 March 2015) was a Turkish singer-songwriter, folk music composer.
