= Behsat Üvez =

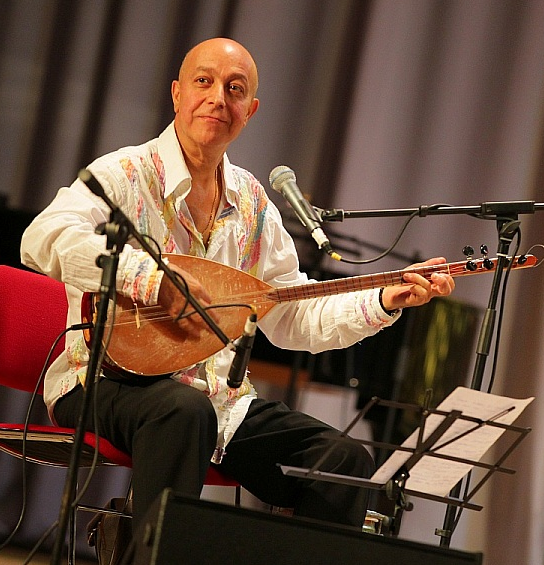

Background information
- Born: May 2, 1959; Ankara, Turkey
- Origin: Turkey
- Died: February 22, 2013 (aged 53) Groningen, Netherlands
- Genres: World Music
- Occupations: Singer, Composer, teacher, Musician
- Years active: 1971–2013

Behsat Üvez (May 2, 1959 – February 22, 2013) was a Turkish singer, composer, and teacher. He was the founder of Barana.

Üvez was born in Ankara.

== Death ==
On February 22, 2013, Behsat Üvez died of lung cancer in Groningen.

== Discography ==
=== Albums ===
- Barana Co. (2002)
- İleriye Anılar
- Gül ve Bülbül
- Şarap (2009)
- Xenopolis (2011, with Ceylan Ertem )
- Electro Shaman (2012)

== Projects, Tours ==
- Female Factory (1998, 1999, 2000)
- 5-May project with the Metropol Orchestra (1998)
- Music Meeting (Nijmegen, 2000)
- Foundation Jazz Utrecht (2000-2001)
- The Culture Factory Amsterdam (1999-2000)
- Foundation Kulsan (2000)
- Circus Colourful City in Nijmegen (2001)
- Global Village Orchestra (2001'den günümüze)
- Festival "Klap op de Vuurpijl"-NPS/Radio 4 with Alan Laurrilard's Seafood plus (Aralık 2001)
- Raiz met Fernando Lamerinihas (Şubat 2003)
- Made in Holland (Eylül, Ekim 2003)
- Xenopolis (2011)
- Barana Festival (2012)
