= May 2016 Gaziantep bombing =

Car bombing in Turkey attributed to ISIL

Coordinates: 37.0675169°N 37.3739705°E

- Part of the Turkey–Islamic State conflict
- Location: Police Headquarters, Şehitkamil, Gaziantep Province, Turkey
- Date: 1 May 2016; 09:17 (UTC+3)
- Target: Security forces
- Attack type: Car bombing, suicide bombing
- Deaths: 2 police personnel 1 perpetrator
- Injuries: 22 (18 police officers and 4 civilians)
- Perpetrator: Islamic State

On 1 May 2016, a car bombing took place in the Turkish city of Gaziantep. The bombing took place at 09:17 (UTC+3) in front of the police headquarters along the thoroughfare Prof. Dr. Muammer Aksoy Boulevard. 2 police personnel were killed and 22 people, consisting of 18 police personnel and 4 civilians, were injured. The perpetrator was also killed.

== Background ==
The bombing occurred at a time when Turkey was targeted by successive bombings from Kurdish and Islamist organisations alike. The most recent bombing had occurred on 27 April in Bursa. Gaziantep Police had recently conducted a number of operations against active Kurdistan Workers' Party (PKK) and Islamic State (IS) cells in the city. According to reports in the Turkish media, Gaziantep Police had intelligence about such an attack that could be made to coincide with May 1st.

== Bombing ==
The bombing took place around 10 metres away from the police headquarters, near Demokrasi Square where the governor's office, town hall, Kamil Ocak Stadium and a number of businesses are located. The area had been closed due to May Day and two vehicles reportedly entered the area by crossing through the barriers. The assailants opened fire on the security forces in the area with machine guns, and as the police responded and the car fled, a second car that followed was detonated. According to Arif Ekici, a member of parliament of the Republican People's Party representing Gaziantep, the death toll would have been much higher if not for a policeman who saw the incoming vehicle that carried the bomb and opened fire, alerting his colleagues in time. The policeman himself was killed in the attack.

The glasses of the businesses and public buildings in the area were broken in the blast.

No groups claimed responsibility for the bombing. According to Habertürk, the suspected perpetrator of the attack was the IS, with the possible assailant being İsmail Güneş, whose father was arrested. Güneş was reportedly known to be an ISIL member and his psychological situation had reportedly deteriorated after the recent death of his mother.

== Aftermath ==
The area of the bombing was completely cleared of pedestrians and traffic. Following the attack, May Day celebrations that were scheduled in the city were cancelled, as well as a basketball match scheduled between Royal Halı Gaziantep and Fenerbahçe in the city. A ban on broadcasting about the attack was put in place by Turkish authorities.

Following the attack, police in the city called for vigilance about a possibility that an attack could be carried out using a fake ambulance.
