= 2013 in Turkish television =

This is a list of Turkish television related events from 2013.

== Events ==
- 18 February - Mustafa Bozkurt wins the second season of O Ses Türkiye.

== Television shows ==
=== 2010s ===
- O Ses Türkiye (2011–present)

== See also ==
- 2013 in Turkey
