= 1992 in Turkey =

- Centuries: 20th; 21st
- Decades: 1970s; 1980s; 1990s; 2000s; 2010s
- See also: List of years in Turkey

Events in the year 1992 in Turkey.

== Parliament ==
- 19th Parliament of Turkey

== Incumbents ==
- President – Turgut Özal
- Prime Minister – Süleyman Demirel
- Leader of the opposition – Mesut Yılmaz

== Ruling party and the main opposition ==
- Ruling party – True Path Party (DYP)
- Main opposition – Motherland Party (ANAP)

== Cabinet ==
- 49th government of Turkey

== Events ==
- 2 January – Avalanche in Hakkari Province, 19 deaths
- 1 February – Avalanche in Şırnak Province, 91 deaths
- 3 March – Mine accident in Zonguldak Province, 122 deaths
- 7 March – Ehud Sadan, the security chief for the Israeli embassy in Ankara, is assassinated in a car bombing.
- 13 March – The 6.7 M_{w} Erzincan earthquake shook area with a maximum Mercalli intensity of VIII (Severe), killing 498–652 and injuring 2,000.
- 16 May – Clash between the armed forces and the Pkk in Şırnak Province
- 17 May – Beşiktaş won the championship of the Turkish football league
- 15 June – In European Double trap championship, Turkish team won the gold medal
- 19 June – All parties closed by the previous military government were given the right to be reestablished
- 24 June – Organization of the Black Sea Economic Cooperation treaty was signed in İstanbul
- 28 July – Weightlifter Naim Süleymanoğlu won gold medal in World championship in Barselona
- 30 August – Clash between the armed forces and Pkk.
- 9 September – Republican People's Party (CHP) was refounded on the 59th anniversary of the CHP's former establishment (Most members are from the Social Democrat Populist Party (SHP)
- 29 September – Clash between the armed forces and Pkk in Hakkari Province
- 16 October and the following days – In a hot pursuit operation armed forces entered Iraq
- 23 November – In World Karate championship held in Granada, Veysel Bumin won the gold medal
- 13 January – President vetoed the ILO convention
- 2 December – Split in ANAP
- 31 December – The film Basic Instinct was banned

== Births ==
- 1 January – Esma Aydemir, middle-distance runner
- 3 February – Berkin Kamil Arslan, footballer
- 7 February – Engin Bekdemir, footballer
- 14 August – Barış Yardımcı, footballer
- 23 February – Şaziye Okur, weightlifter
- 2 March – Kerem Bulut, footballer
- 27 March – Kıvılcım Kaya, hammer thrower
- 10 April – Atila Turan, footballer
- 10 May – Barış Örücü, footballer
- 3 August – Gamze Bulut, distance runner
- 16 August – Nur Tatar, taekwondo practitioner
- 7 September – Gizem Karaca, model
- 24 October – Emel Türkyılmaz, basketball player
- 26 October – Ayşegül Günay, basketball player

== Deaths ==
- 7 February – Mevhibe İnönü (born 1897), İsmet İnönü's wife
- 13 April – Feza Gürsey (born 1921), physicist
- 22 July – Toto Karaca (born 1912), theatre actor
- 29 July – Kemal Kayacan (born 1915), admiral
- 9 August – Aytekin Kotil (born 1934), politician
- 5 October – Adile Ayda (born 1912), diplomat

== Gallery ==
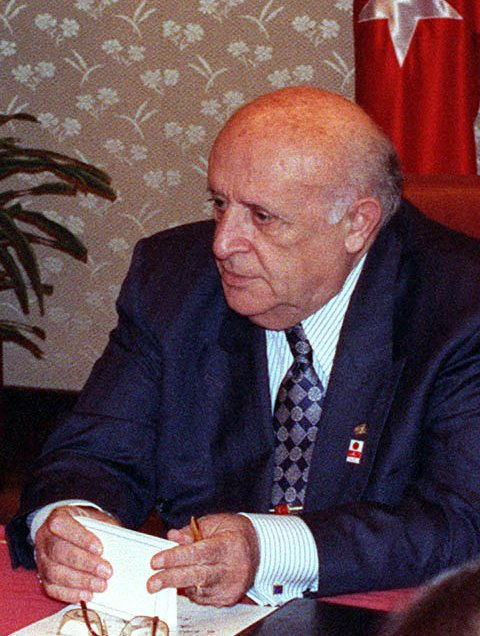
Süleyman Demirel

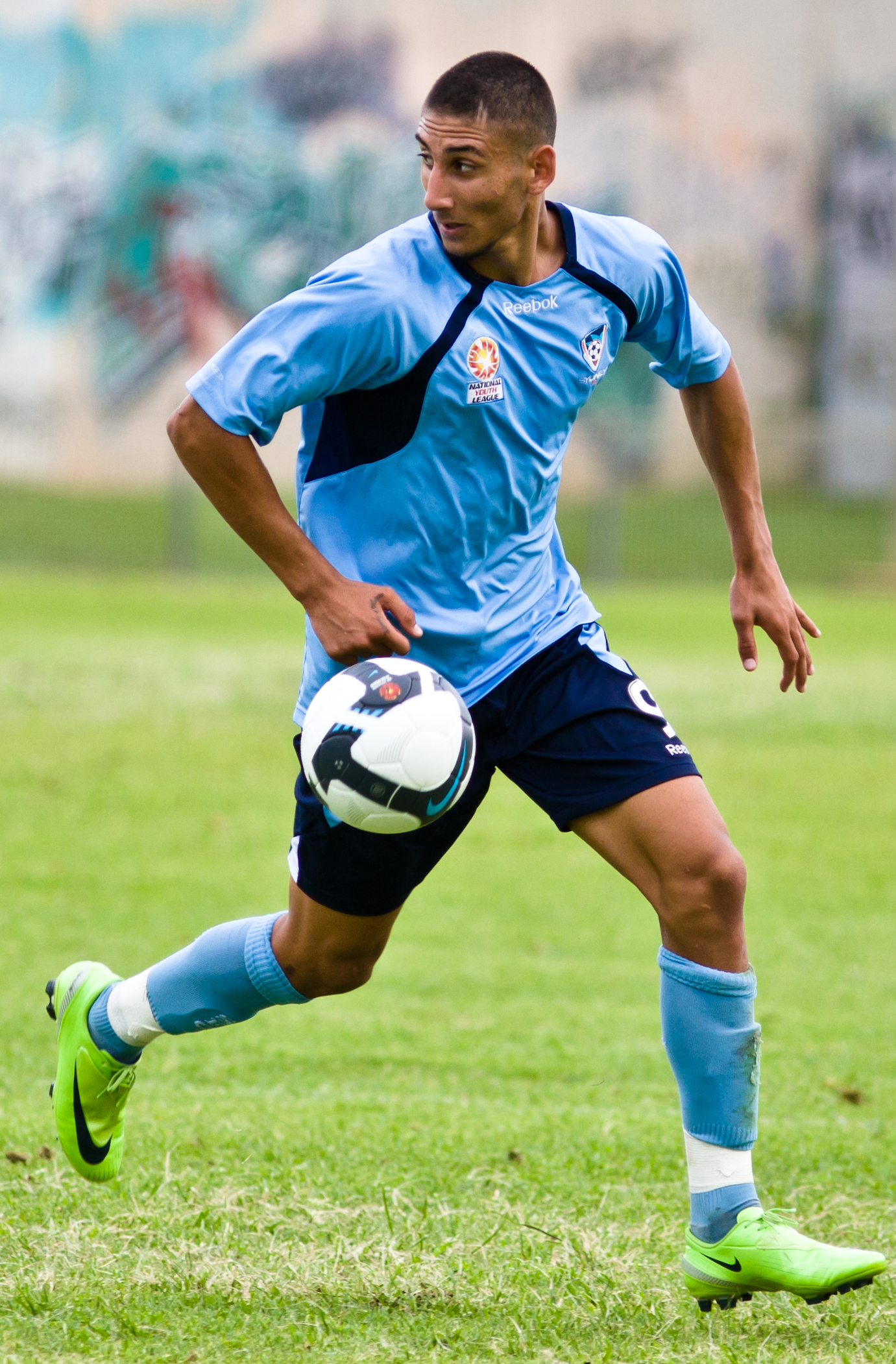
Kerem Bulut

== Sports ==
- Turkey at the 1992 Summer Olympics
- Turkey at the 1992 Winter Olympics

== See also ==
- Turkey in the Eurovision Song Contest 1992
- 1991-92 1.Lig
