= 1995 in Turkey =

- Centuries: 20th; 21st
- Decades: 1970s; 1980s; 1990s; 2000s; 2010s
- See also: List of years in Turkey

Events in the year 1995 in Turkey.

== Parliament ==
- 19th Parliament of Turkey (up to 24 December)
- 20th Parliament of Turkey

== Incumbents ==
- President – Süleyman Demirel
- Prime Minister – Tansu Çiller
- Leader of the opposition – Mesut Yılmaz

== Ruling party and the main opposition ==
- Ruling party – True Path Party (DYP)
- Main opposition – Motherland Party (ANAP)

== Cabinet ==
- 50th government of Turkey (up to 5 October)
- 51st government of Turkey (5 October – 30 October)
- 52nd government of Turkey (from 30 October)

== Events ==
- 4 January – Two parties with the same background, namely Social Democratic Populist Party (SHP) and Republican People's Party (CHP), decided to merge.
- 12 February – Although SHP was the bigger partner, Erdal İnönü, the former leader of SHP, proposed that they should merge under the CHP banner.
- 12 February – Because of dense smog, schools were temporarily closed in İstanbul.
- 18 February – SHP merged with the CHP and Hikmet Çetin was elected as the caretaker leader of CHP.
- 12/13 March – Gazi Quarter riots in İstanbul
- 20 March – Operation Steel launched against Kurdish separatists
- 11 April – Tansu Çiller started irrigation through the Şanlıurfa Irrigation Tunnels
- 21 May – Beşiktaş won the championship of the Turkish football league
- 12 June – 22 soldiers were killed by Kurdish separatists in Tunceli Province
- 7 July – Operation against Kurdish separatists around the Iraq border
- 25 July – Gold exchange market was opened
- 29 August – Flood in Rize; 10 deaths
- 7 September – Militants killed 9 workers in Hatay Province
- 15 September – Clash between government forces and militants in Diyarbakır Province
- 1 October – Earthquake in Dinar, Afyonkarahisar; 90 deaths
- 9 September – Deniz Baykal was elected as the new president of CHP
- 19 September – Tansu Çiller and Deniz Baykal could not agree on the coalition protocol and the 50th government dissolved (but continued up to the formation of the new government)
- 13 October – Tansu Çiller’s 2nd government (founded on 5 October) lost a vote of confidence
- 5 November – Tansu Çiller’s 3rd government (founded on 30 October, with their coalition partner CHP) received the vote of confidence
- 13 December – Customs Union with European Union
- 24 December – General elections :Welfare Party 158 seats, ANAP 132 seats, DYP 135 seats, DSP 76 seats, CHP 49 seats

== Deaths ==
- 11 January – Onat Kutlar (born 1936), writer
- 15 January – Sadi Eldem (born 1910), diplomat
- 18 March – Sadri Alışık (born 1925), actor
- 25 March – Belgin Doruk (born 1936), actress
- 6 July – Aziz Nesin (born 1915), writer and humorist
- 10 July – Mehmet Ali Aybar (born 1908), politician
- 27 July – Melih Esenbel (born 1915), diplomat
- 1 September – Hıfzı Oğuz Bekata (born 1911), politician and lawyer
- 27 September – Baha Akşit (born 1914), politician
- 8 November – Mükerrem Sarol (born 1909), physician and politician

== Gallery ==
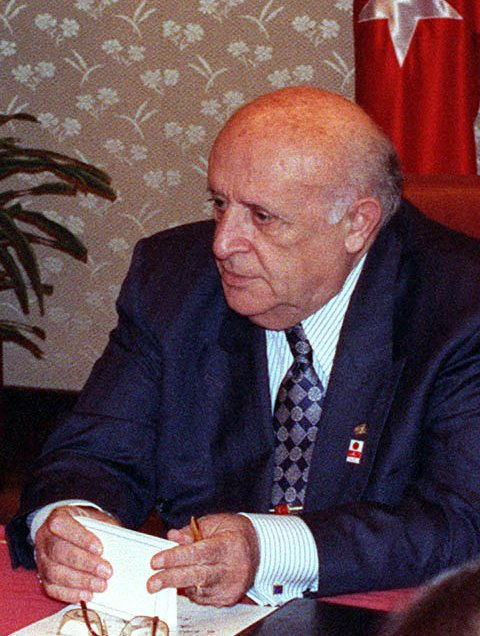
Süleyman Demirel

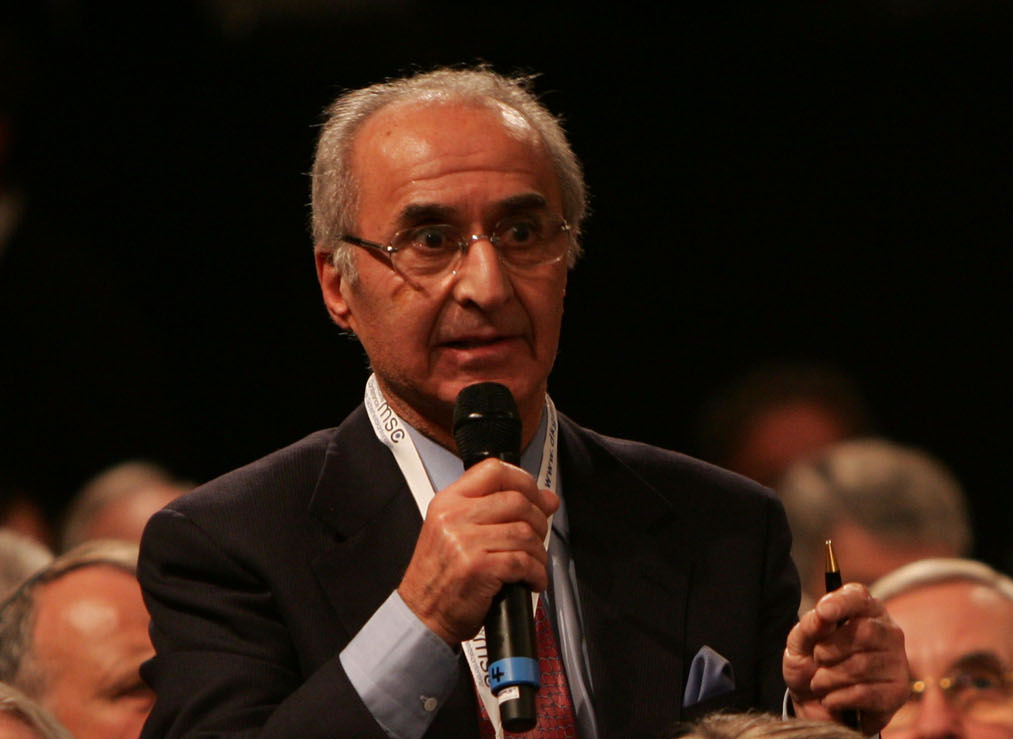
Hikmet Çetin

== See also ==
- 1994-95 1.Lig
- Turkey in the Eurovision Song Contest 1995
