= Ataseven =

Ataseven is a Turkish surname. Notable people with the surname include:

- Asaf Ataseven (1932–2003), Turkish physician
- Eray Ataseven (born 1993), Turkish footballer
- Metin Ataseven (born 1972), Swedish politician
