= Tiryaki =

Tiryaki is a Turkish surname. Notable people with the surname include:

- Tiryaki Hasan Pasha, Turkish military leader
- Ayşe Olcay Tiryaki, Turkish physician
- Cansu Tiryaki, Turkish female football referee
- Mustafa Tiryaki, Turkish footballer
