= Kabataş Boys High School =

Coordinates: 41°02′47.76″N 29°01′21.72″E

- Kabataş Erkek Lisesi; Kabataş Mekteb-i İdâdisi
- Kabataş Erkek Lisesi
- Ortaköy; Istanbul; Turkey

Information
- School type: Public, Boarding
- Motto: Karanlığı Ezenlerin Lisesi (School of The Ones Fighting Against Darkness)
- Founded: 1908
- Founder: Abdul Hamid II
- Head of school: Muharrem Bayrak
- Campus: Bosphorus
- Colours: Red and Black
- Website: www.kabataserkeklisesi.k12.tr

Kabataş Boys High School (Turkish: Kabataş Erkek Lisesi; Ottoman Turkish: Kabataş Mekteb-i İdâdisi) is one of the oldest and most prominent high schools in Turkey. It is located in Ortaköy at Bosphorus in Istanbul.

== History ==
The high school was established in 1908 by the Ottoman sultan Abdulhamid II. Kabataş Mekteb-i İdadisi had served to raise qualified leaders for the Ottoman Empire for 15 years. After Turkey became a republic in 1923, the institution became a standard high school with its new name: Kabataş Erkek Lisesi. Owing to the inadequacy of the building used by the school, Kabataş Erkek Lisesi had to move to the nearby Feriye Palaces, where the relatives of Sultans -the royal families- had previously been accommodated. Feriye Palaces are known for not only their fascinating view of the Bosphorus but also an unfortunate event, the imprisonment and alleged murder of Sultan Abdülaziz II, which took place in the buildings. During the Balkan Wars, Kabataş sent numerous students to the battlefront. In the early years, only boys were educated at the high school. However, as of 1994, girls have also been admitted to the school.

Later in the first half of the 20th century, the Dormitory and the Dining Hall were added to the buildings of Kabataş Erkek Lisesi as well as the building that contained the Conference Hall and the laboratories. With the admission of female students at the high school in 1994 and the establishment of English preparatory classes in 1997, this very school has confirmed its prominent place in the field of education of the country. Due to the quality of education it has provided and the success it has proven, Kabataş Erkek Lisesi was promoted to an Anatolian High School in 1998. In 2006, the duration of education in high school was increased to 5 years.

After 117 years from its establishment, Kabataş Erkek Lisesi still stands as one of the most successful educational institutions of the country with its high-standard education, international recognition and glorified students.

Kabataş High School celebrated its 117th anniversary in 2025 with a festival.

== Directors of the school ==
=== Ottoman Empire period ===
- Hasan Tahsin Ayni (1908-1908)
- Lütfü Emiroğlu (1908-1911)
- Hüseyin Mazım (1911-1914)
- M. Sait Erkol (1914-1917)
- Abdülkerim Nadir (1917-1922)

=== Turkish Republic Period ===
- M. Edip Ergun (1922-1931)
- Mahmut Ekrem (1931-1932)
- Nuri Onur (1932-1949)
- Cemal Artüz (1949-1951)
- Faik Dranaz (1951-1958)
- Adnan Dinçer (1958-1974)
- M. Nihat Tünaydın (1974-1980)
- A. Azmi Güler (1980-1985)
- Korel Haksun (1985-2005)
- Recep Memiş (2005-2010)
- Uğur Açıkgöz (2010-2012)
- Fatih Güldal (2015-2018)
- Selman Küçük (2018-2021)
- Muharrem Bayrak (2021- )

== Notable alumni ==
- Adnan Kahveci – politician former Minister of Finance
- Ahmet Taner Kışlalı – politician, former Minister of Culture, writer
- Ahmet Yalçınkaya – poet and writer
- Ali Akansu – Professor, electrical and computer engineering
- Ali Bayramoğlu – businessman
- Ali İhsan Göğüş – Former Tourism Minister
- Ali Uras – Former President of Galatasaray S.K. and Turkish Football Federation
- Ergican Saydam – pianist
- Erkan Oğur - guitarist
- Erol Çevikçe – former Minister of Environment and City Planning
- Fahri Kasırga – former Minister of Justice
- Feridun Karakaya – actor
- Gülhan Şen – television presenter
- Hasan Gemici – former Minister of State
- Hikmet Sami Türk – former Minister of Justice
- İsmet Giritli – lawyer, journalist, writer
- Kemal Kafalı – former president of Istanbul Technical University
- Küçük İskender – writer, poet
- Naim Talu – former Prime Minister
- Mehmet Köksal – lawyer
- Muhammad Ahmad al-Mangoush – former prime minister of Libya
- Murat Soygeniş – architect, professor
- Namık Gedik – former Minister of the Interior
- Nahit Menteşe – former deputy prime minister and Minister of the Interior
- Necati Çelim – former MP for Aydın Province and gynecologist
- Nusret Fişek – former Minister of Health
- Ömer Kavur – film director
- Özdemir Asaf – poet
- Özdemir Bayraktar - founder of Baykar
- Sabih Kanadoğlu – honorary attorney prosecutor of Court of Cassation of Turkey
- Süleyman Seba – former president and honorary president of Beşiktaş J.K.
- Sanlı Sarıalioğlu – former player for Beşiktaş J.K. and the Turkey national football team
- Şeref Has – former player for Fenerbahçe S.K. and the Turkey national football team
- Yalçın Küçük – writer and researcher
- Yaşar Kaya – politician and journalist

== See also ==
- List of schools in Istanbul
