= Köksal =

Köksal is a name of Turkish origin. It may refer to:

== Given name ==
- Köksal Toptan (born 1943), Turkish lawyer and politician with the Justice and Development Party
- Köksal Yedek (born 1985), Turkish footballer

== Surname ==
- Ahmet Köksal (1920–1997), Turkish poet and writer
- Burcu Köksal (born 1980), Turkish politician
- Cansu Köksal (born 1994), Turkish female professional basketball player
- Füsun Köksal (born 1973), Turkish composer
- Hikmet Köksal (1932–2020), Turkish retired general
- Hüseyin Göksenin Köksal (born 1991), Turkish professional basketball player
- İskender Köksal (born 1981), Turkish professional footballer
- Mehmet Köksal (born 1963), Turkish lawyer
- Nil Köksal, Turkish-born Canadian television and radio journalist
- Pınar Köksal (1946–2019), female Turkish composer
- Serhat Köksal (born 1990), Dutch-born Turkish professional footballer
- Sönmez Köksal (born 1940), Turkish civil servant
