= 1994 in Turkey =

- Centuries: 20th; 21st
- Decades: 1970s; 1980s; 1990s; 2000s; 2010s
- See also: List of years in Turkey

Events in the year 1994 in Turkey.

== Parliament ==
- 19th Parliament of Turkey

== Incumbents ==
- President – Süleyman Demirel
- Prime Minister – Tansu Çiller
- Leader of the opposition – Mesut Yılmaz

== Ruling party and the main opposition ==
- Ruling party – True Path Party (DYP)
- Main opposition – Motherland Party (ANAP)

== Cabinet ==
- 50th government of Turkey

== Events ==
- 10 January – CIA warned the Turkish prime minister Tansu Çiller about a possible assassination in Belgium
- 23 January – Pkk killed 20 villagers in Mardin Province
- 26 January – Devaluation
- 13 March – Two Greek Cypriot tankers collided in Bosphorous.
- 27 March – Local elections
- 5 April – Economic rehabilitation program (known as bitter recipe)
- 5 May – Weightlifter Naim Süleymanoğlu gained the title European champion
- 15 May – Galatasaray won the championship of the Turkish football league
- 10 August – First Turkish telecommunication satellite Turksat 1B
- 18 October – Turkic Council in Istanbul
- 8 November – Rahmi Koç was elected as the new president of the International Chamber of Commerce
- 19 November – Weightlifter Halil Mutlu broke 3 world records in 54 kg
- 20 November – Weightlifter Nain Süleymanoğlu broke 3 world records in 64 kg
- 29 December – Turkish Airlines Flight 278 crashed on approach to Van Ferit Melen Airport killing 57. Nineteen survived the incident.
- Full date unknown –
  - Kuzeybatı real estate services firm is founded

== Births ==
- 15 January – Sinan Gümüş, footballer
- 6 February – İbrahim Yılmaz, footballer
- 9 March – Okay Yokuşlu, footballer
- 12 March – Yusuf Emre Gültekin, footballer
- 1 May – İlkay Durmuş, footballer
- 25 May – Samed Yeşil, footballer

== Deaths ==
- 20 January – Bedia Muvahhit (born 1897), theatre actress
- 15 March – Mehmed Orhan (born 1909), head of the Ottoman dynasty
- 16 March – Medeni Berk (born 1913), banker and politician
- 14 May – Cihat Arman (born 1919), footballer and coach
- 31 May – Uzay Heparı (born 1969), musician

== Gallery ==
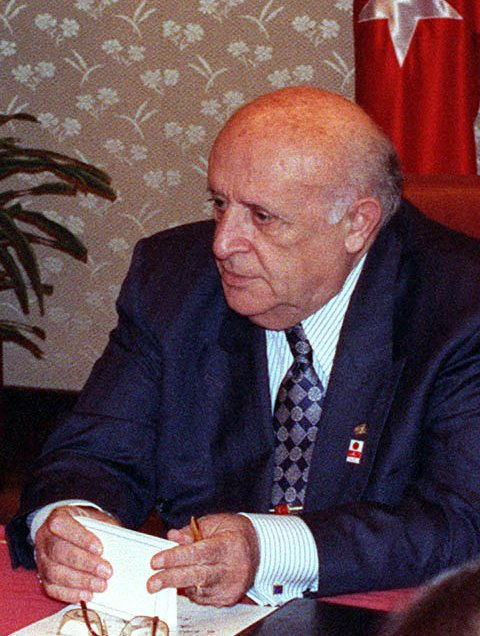
Süleyman Demirel

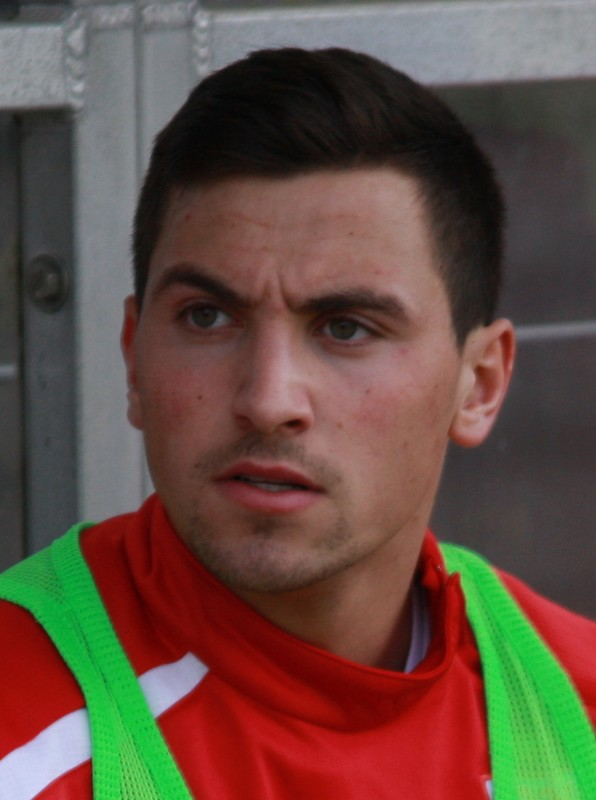
Sinan Gümüş

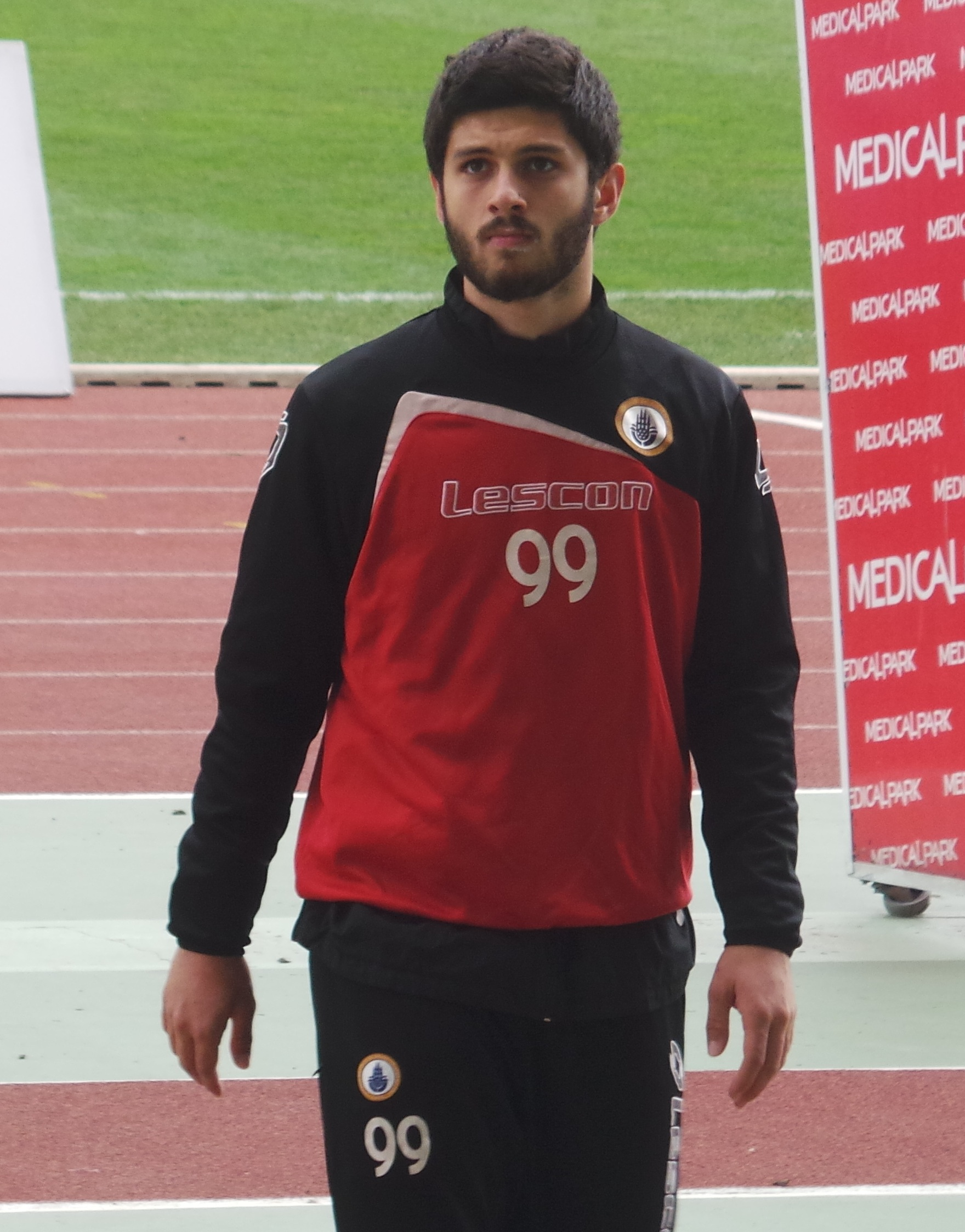
İbrahim Yılmaz

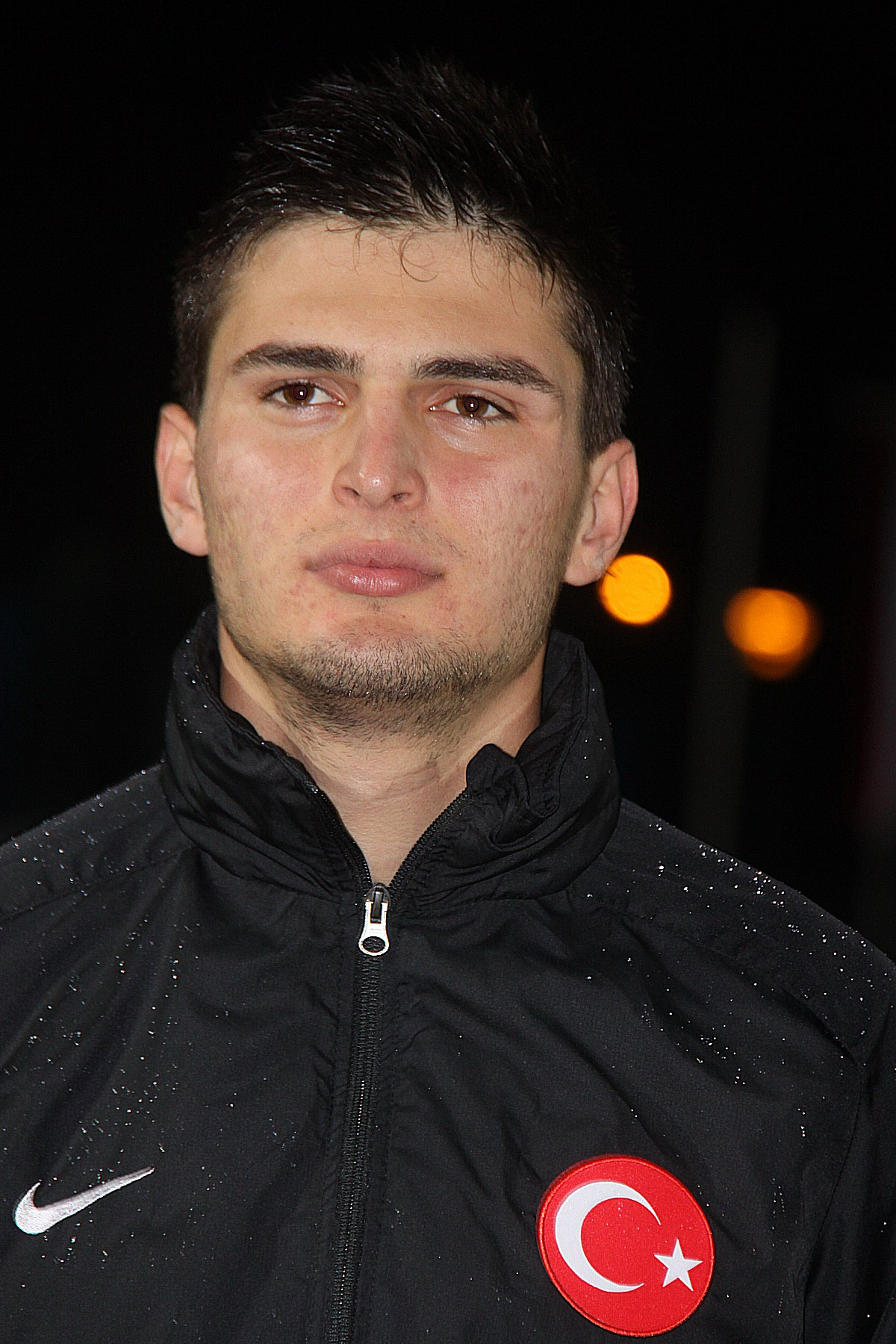
Okay Yokuşlu

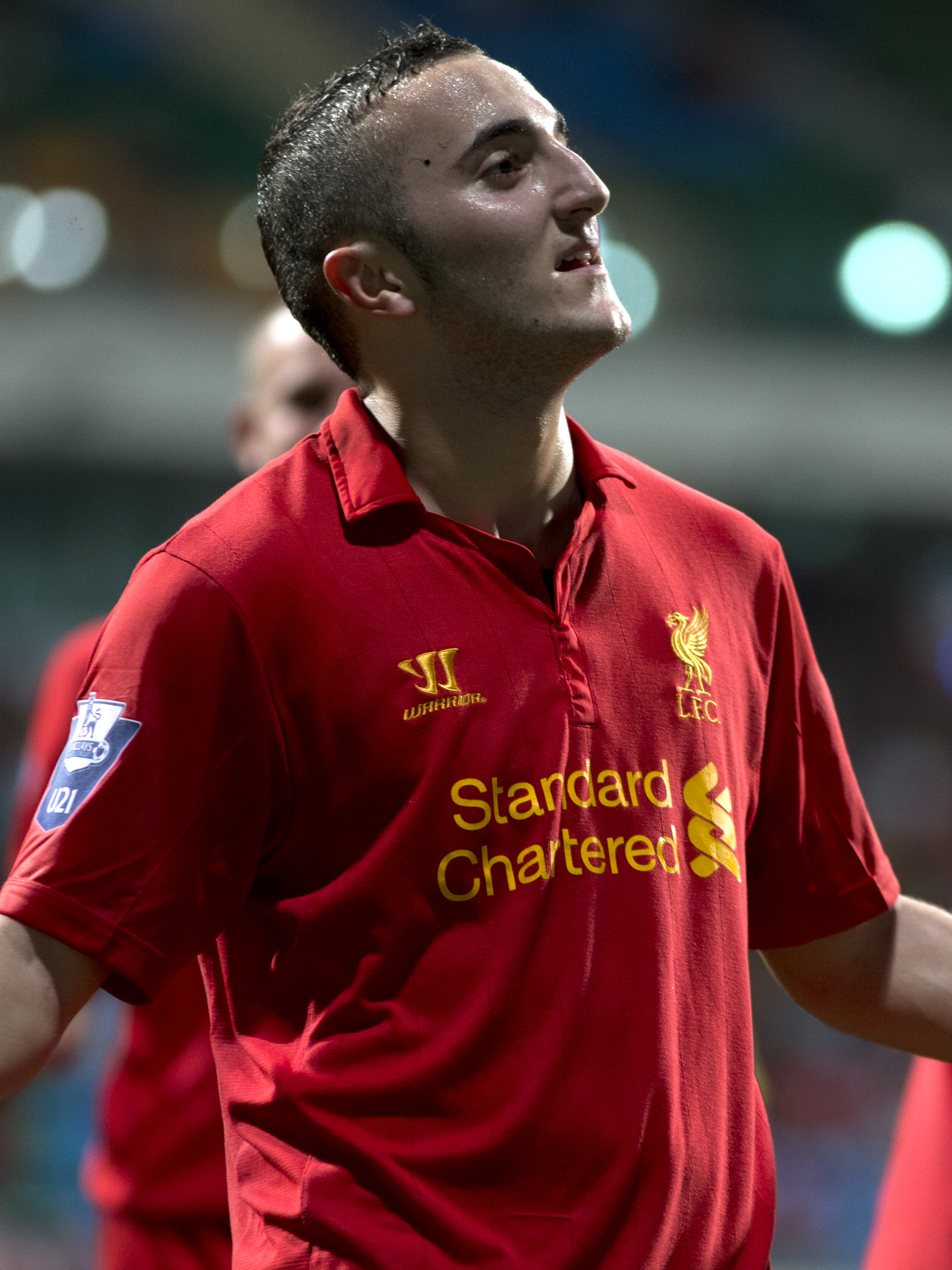
Samed Yeşil

== See also ==
- 1993-94 1.Lig
- Turkey at the 1994 Winter Olympics
