= Pasin =

Pasin may refer to:

== People ==
- Ali Rıza Pasin (1890–1946), Turkish physician
- Antonio Pasin (1897–1990), Italian-American toymaker
- Dave Pasin (born 1966), American ice hockey player
- Jeanette Pasin Sloan (born 1946), American visual artist
- Tony Pasin (born 1977), Australian politician

== Places ==
- Pasin Darreh, Iran
- Pašin Potok, Croatia
- Pasinler, Erzurum, Turkey
