= Necati Çelim =

Turkish politician

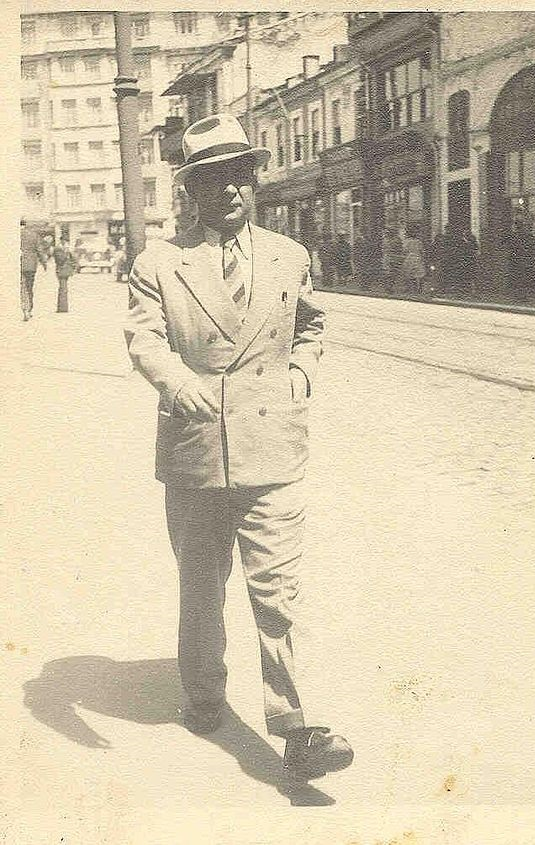

Personal details
- Born: 1909 Köşk, Aydın Province, Ottoman Empire
- Died: 5 March 1986 (aged 76–77) İzmir, Turkey

Nuh Necati Çelim (1909 – 5 March 1986) was a Turkish politician, physician and Member of Parliament (MP) for the Democrat Party. He represented the Aydın Province in the 10th and 11th Turkish parliaments from 1954 to 1960. He was sentenced to death in the Yassıada trials undertaken after the 1960 Turkish coup d'état, but his sentence was later commuted to life in prison. He was given a six-month release in September 1964 due to health problems, and in 1965, he was released from the Kayseri prison along with the rest of the Democratic Party MPs remaining in prison.

== Family background and education ==
Çelim was born in Köşk in 1909 to Hafız Ahmet and Muhsine Hanım. He comes from the family of Posacılar, an old Turkoman family with roots in Western Turkestan who settled originally in Karahayıt, Aydın during the Ottoman Interregnum (1402–1413).

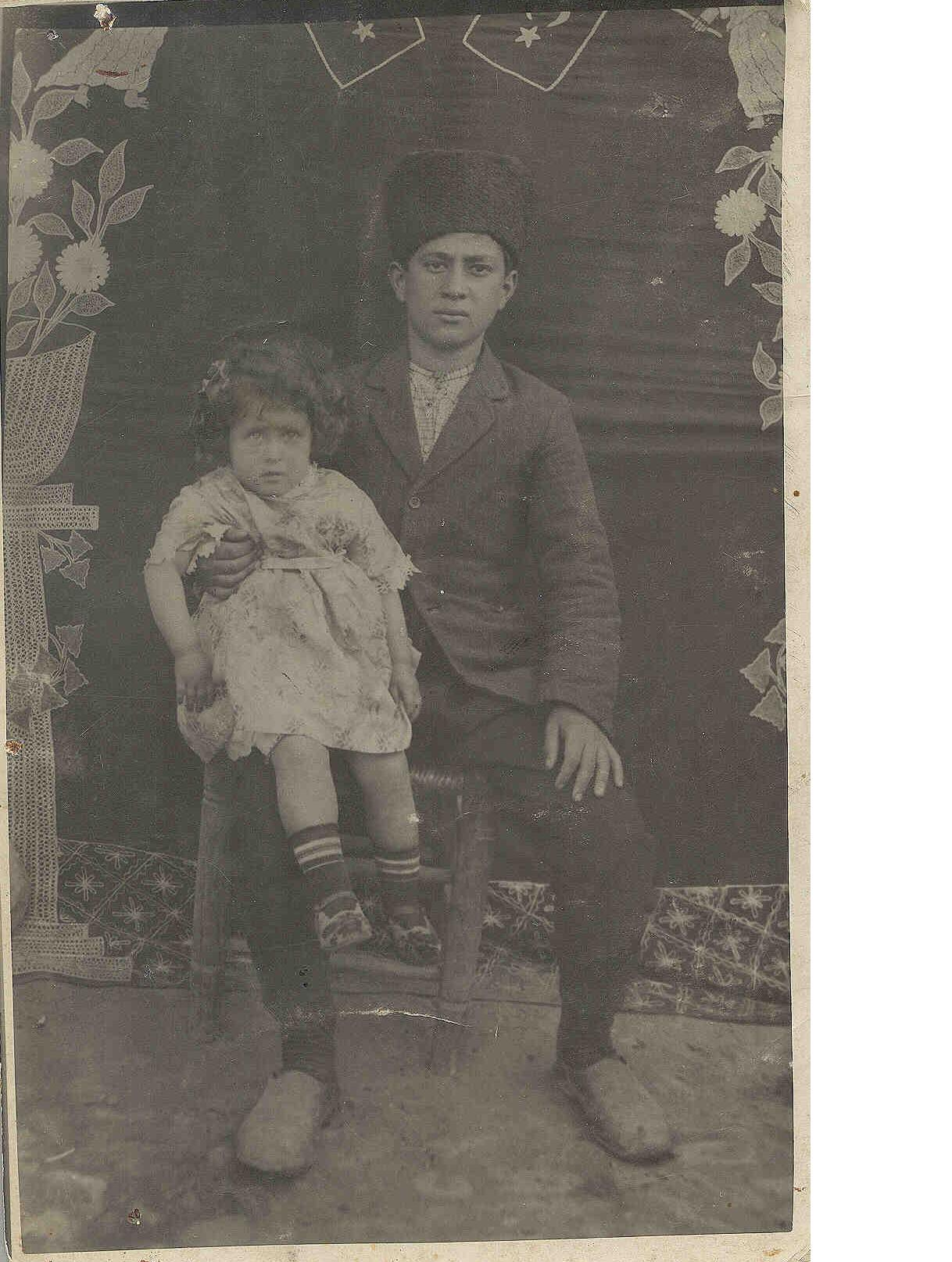
Necati Çelim, 1920s

He did not initially attend secular school but was educated in religion instead. His father, who owned the Posacılar Farm, wanted him to focus on their large farming and trading businesses instead of getting further education. In protest, Çelim escaped from home with the financial help of his mother. He studied in cities where he had relatives, since at that time, there were no middle or high schools in Aydın. He took and passed primary school exams, as he had not been able to go to school during the years that spanned World War I and the Turkish War of Independence. Next, he went to Manisa and graduated from middle school. Later, he went to Istanbul and graduated from Kabataş High School. Upon graduation from high school, he entered the Medical School at Istanbul University, one of the cornerstones of President Mustafa Kemal Atatürk's new educational institutions that was at the time heavily staffed by German and Austrian scientists who the Nazi regime in Germany had considered racially or politically undesirable and thus exiled. He graduated from the Medical School in 1934. His family supported him until the Great Depression, when his family's business was heavily hit, forcing him to complete the remainder of his studies with a scholarship from a family friend. He completed his residency at Zeynep Kamil Women's and Children's Diseases Education and Research Hospital and became a gynecologist. In addition to his native Turkish, he could read and write in French, Arabic, and Persian.

== Career as a government-appointed doctor ==
Çelim was first appointed as a doctor to Cizre in Şırnak Province, working there four years. Then, he was appointed to Çukurova in the Mersin Province with a focus on fighting malaria.

In the 1930s in Çukurova, it was determined that malaria cases were much more frequent around paddy fields. As such, a law was passed in 1935 to administer the wet-field cultivation in Turkey. In every region, a committee was formed for this purpose with a government administrator, a doctor, and a producer on board. Çelim helped significantly to eradicate malaria from around Çukurova during this time. However, some large land owners, unhappy with losing too much farming land to malaria prevention efforts, asked the government to transfer him out of Mersin. Subsequently, he was appointed to Söğüt in Bilecik Province. His final post was at Bayındır in İzmir Province, once again with a focus on fighting malaria. This was to be his last government post, and after his service in Bayındır, he returned to Aydın Province to operate his private practice.

== Political life ==
During his time as an MP (1954–1960), he focused on legislative efforts to increase the amount of money allocated to the Ministry of Education as well as improving the living standards of teachers.

He proposed the legislation that eventually led to the formation of the investigation committee on relations between the Turkish Army and Republican People's Party (CHP), which had established the Turkish Republic and had remained in power from the founding of the Republic through 1950. The committee was founded in April 1960, just one month before the 1960 Turkish coup d'état. The 15-person investigation committee had mostly focused on the relationships between the CHP and the Army but they were also looking into international connections of the upcoming coup d'état. Nevertheless, the committee could not stop the coup.

After to the 1960 Turkish coup d'état, the generals took control of the country and prime minister Adnan Menderes, along with two of his ministers, were executed by hanging for violating the constitution, and many Democratic Party members were imprisoned and banned from political life. Furthermore, the Turkish military declared its allegiance to NATO and CENTO, received over a billion dollars in aid from the United States, and later forced more than half the officer corps of the Turkish Military into retirement. As a result, about 90 percent of the generals, 75 percent of the colonels, 50 percent of the lieutenant colonels and 30 percent of the majors were discharged from the army.

== Contributions to Aydın during his political career ==
Necati Çelim is one of the founding members and also one of the original Board of Directors of the Aydın Textiles Factory. Aydın Textiles Factory is the first textiles factory of the city of Aydın and for over 25 years was the largest employer in the region. Çelim also wrote and submitted the legislation that made Kuşadası part of Aydın Province instead of İzmir Province. Çeşme, part of İzmir Province, was the favorite vacation spot of almost all the İzmir Province MPs. Furthermore, the distance between İzmir and Kuşadası was far greater than the distance between Aydın and Kuşadası. Due to these reasons, Kuşadası often did not get much attention from the Turkish Parliament. As a result of the legislation that Necati Çelim spearheaded, Kuşadası started to receive significant investments from the government and started to become an important destination for tourism. This change has also greatly increased Aydın Province's tax revenues. Çelim was also key to securing the government investment for building the first passenger port in Kuşadası.

== 1960 Turkish coup d'état and after the coup ==
After the 1960 Turkish coup d'état, Çelim was first imprisoned in Yassıada and stood trial in the mock "Breach of the Constitution" trial. Afterwards, he was kept as a prisoner in Kayseri until 1964. The generals, now lifetime senators, banned him from practicing medicine upon his release. This ban was overturned in 1966 by the Justice Party, the successor to the Democratic Party. Nevertheless, his political activity were curbed for over ten years, until the late 1970s, although even then he even could not vote in the parliamentary elections or take part in politics. He returned to practicing medicine until his retirement at 73. He moved to the İzmir Province where his daughter, son-in-law, and grandchildren resided and was treated there for his severe respiratory disease. He died in 1986 and is buried in Kuşadası, the hometown of his wife.

== See also ==
- List of Turkish physicians
