= Feridun Karakaya =

Turkish actor

- Born: 1928; Istanbul, Turkey
- Died: April 24, 2004 (aged 75–76); Istanbul, Turkey
- Occupation: Actor
- Years active: 1955–2003

Feridun Karakaya (1928 – April 24, 2004) was a well-known Turkish comedy actor.

== Biography ==
Karakaya educated in Kabataş Erkek Lisesi. He took part in several stage and film productions between years 1955 and 2002. He is best remembered with his famous character "Cilalı İbo" (Ibo the Polished). He died of heart failure at the age of 76. Due to his competent Molière interpretations, he was awarded with Légion d'Honneur.

He was laid to rest at the Zincirlikuyu Cemetery following the religious funeral ceremony held in Teşvikiye Mosque on 26 April 2004, at the time when he could not see his latest movie released.

== Filmography ==
- "Beyaz Mendil" (1955)
- "Görünmeyen Adam İstanbul'da" (1955)
- "Şehir Yıldızları" (1956)
- "Berduş" (1957)
- "Gurbet" (1959)
- "Gönül Kimi Severse" (1959)
- "Cilalı İbo Casuslar Arasında" (1959)
- "Cilalı İbo Yıldızlar Arasında" (1959)
- "Cilalı İbo Ve Tophane Gülü" (1960)
- "Cilalı İbo'nun Çilesi" (1960)
- "Cilalı İbo Zoraki Baba" (1961)
- "Cilalı İbo Rüyalar Aleminde" (1962)
- "Cilalı İbo Perili Köşkte" (1963)
- "Cilalı İbo Kızlar Pansiyonunda" (1963)
- "Beş Şeker Kız" (1964)
- "Cilalı İbo Ve Kırk Haramiler" (1964)
- "Seveceksen Yiğit Sev" (1965)
- "Düğün Gecesi" (1966)
- "Sinekli Bakkal" (1967)
- "Şark Yıldızı" (1967)
- "Urfa İstanbul" (1968)
- "Vuruldum Bu Kıza" (1968)
- "İstanbul Kaldırımları" (1968)
- "Gül ve Şeker" (1968)
- "Mısır'dan Gelen Gelin" (1969)
- "Cilalı İbo Almanya'da" (1970)
- "Cilalı İbo Yetimler Meleği" (1971)
- "Newyorklu Kız" (1971)
- "Cilalı İbo Teksas Fatihi" (1971)
- "Aman Karım Duymasın" (1976)
- "Nazmiye'nin Koltukları" (1976)
- "Donanmanın Gülü" (1987)
- "Banka" (2002)
- "Hayat A.Ş." (2003)
