= Bedrettin Yıldızeli =

Turkish physician

Bedrettin Yıldızeli (born 1970) is a Turkish physician. He is a graduate of Marmara University.

== See also ==
- List of Turkish physicians
