= 1993 in Turkey =

- Centuries: 20th; 21st
- Decades: 1970s; 1980s; 1990s; 2000s; 2010s
- See also: List of years in Turkey

Events in the year 1993 in Turkey.

== Parliament ==
- 19th Parliament of Turkey

== Incumbents ==
- President –

Turgut Özal (up to 17 April)
Süleyman Demirel (from 16 May)

- Prime Minister –

Süleyman Demirel (up to 16 May)
Erdal İnönü (acting 16 May-25 June)
Tansu Çiller (from 25 June)

- Leader of the opposition – Mesut Yılmaz

== Ruling party and the main opposition ==
- Ruling party – True Path Party (DYP)
- Main opposition – Motherland Party (ANAP)

== Cabinet ==
- 49th government of Turkey (up to 25 June)
- 50th government of Turkey (from 25 June)

== Events ==
- 11 January – 15 tonnes of narcotics were seized by the police in a Panama ensign ship
- 15 January – PKK camps were bombarded in Bingöl Province
- 12 January – Avalanche in Bayburt Province
- 27 January – Burial service of Uğur Mumcu
- 21 March – Kurdish Demonstrations in Nevrouz day celebration
- 17 April – 5 day-official mourning following the death of the president Turgut Özal
- 21 April – Burial service of Turgut Özal
- 28 April – Methane explosion in a garbage dump; 28 deaths
- 16 May – Süleyman Demirel was appointed as the 9th president of Turkey. Erdal İnönü was appointed as the acting prime minister.
- 25 May – PKK killed 33 unarmed dischargees in Bingöl Province
- 30 May – Galatasaray won the championship of the Turkish football league
- 13 June – Tansu Çiller was elected as the new president of the True Path Party.
- 25 June – Tansu Çiller together with Erdal İnönü of the SHP formed the new government
- 2 July – Sivas incidents: An Islamist mob sets fire to the hotel where The Satanic Verses translator Aziz Nesin resides in Sivas, killing 37 people.
- 12 July – Hülya Avşar wins the "best actress" award at the Moscow International Film Festival
- 9 August – Corruption investigation in Istanbul municipality (known as ISKİ suit)
- 11 September – Erdal İnönü resigned from his post in the party and Murat Karayalçın replaced him
- 5 October – PKK killed 35 civilians in Siirt Province and Batman Province
- 19 December – Kanal D, a satellite and cable television station, as first regular broadcasts service to start.

== Births ==
- 7 January – Ozan Evrim Özenç, footballer
- 3 March – Ayşe Cora, female basketball player
- 20 March – Özge Kavurmacıoğlu, female basketball player
- 22 May – Berkay Candan, basketball player
- 18 April, Okan Derici, footballer
- 2 June – Melis Sezer, female tennis player
- 16 June – Süleyman Zorba, Turkish-born Austrian politician
- 13 July – Olcay Çakır, female basketball player

== Deaths ==
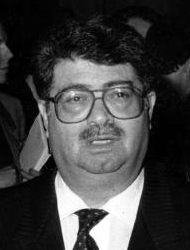
Turgut Özal

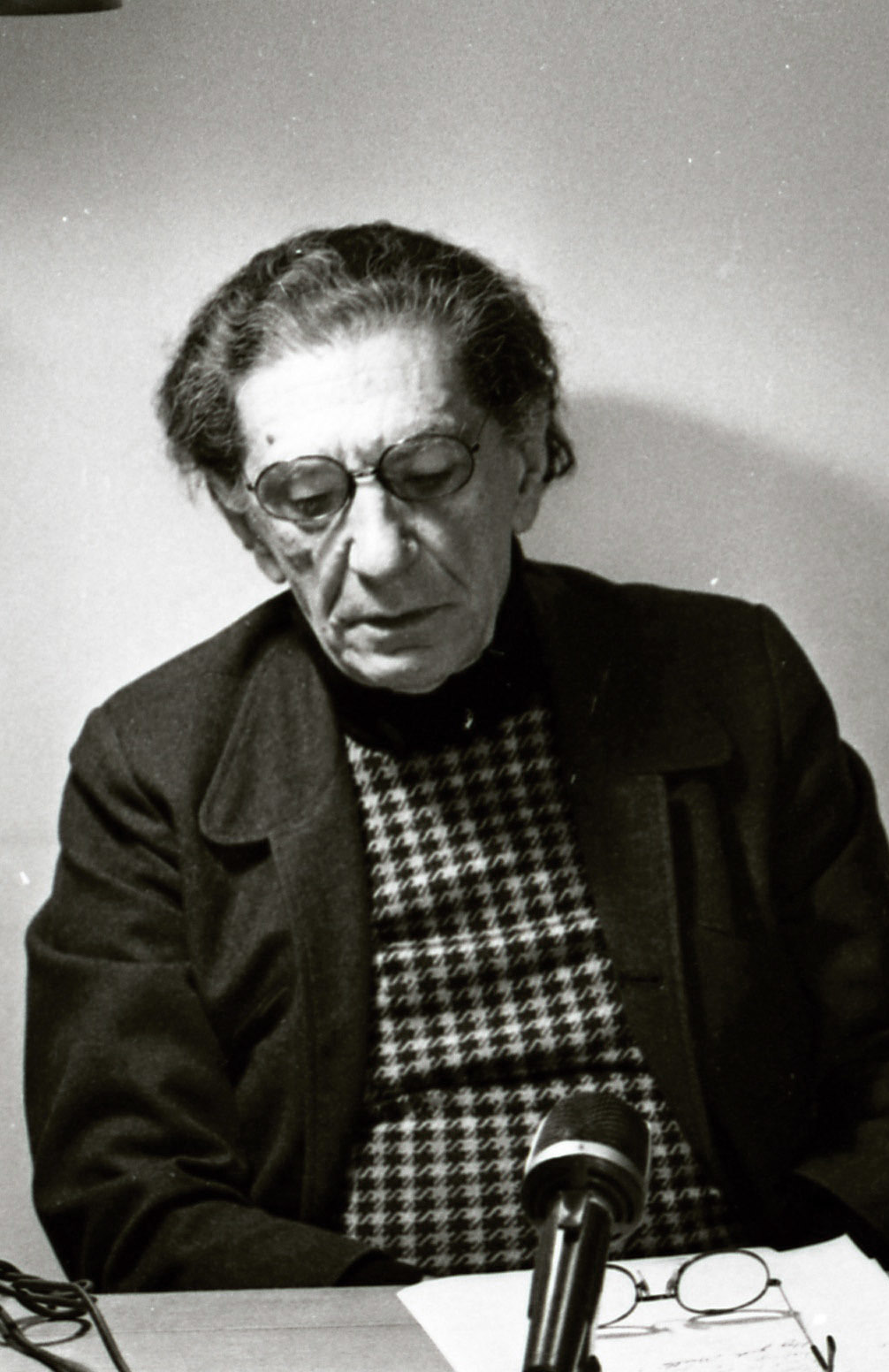
Abidin Dino

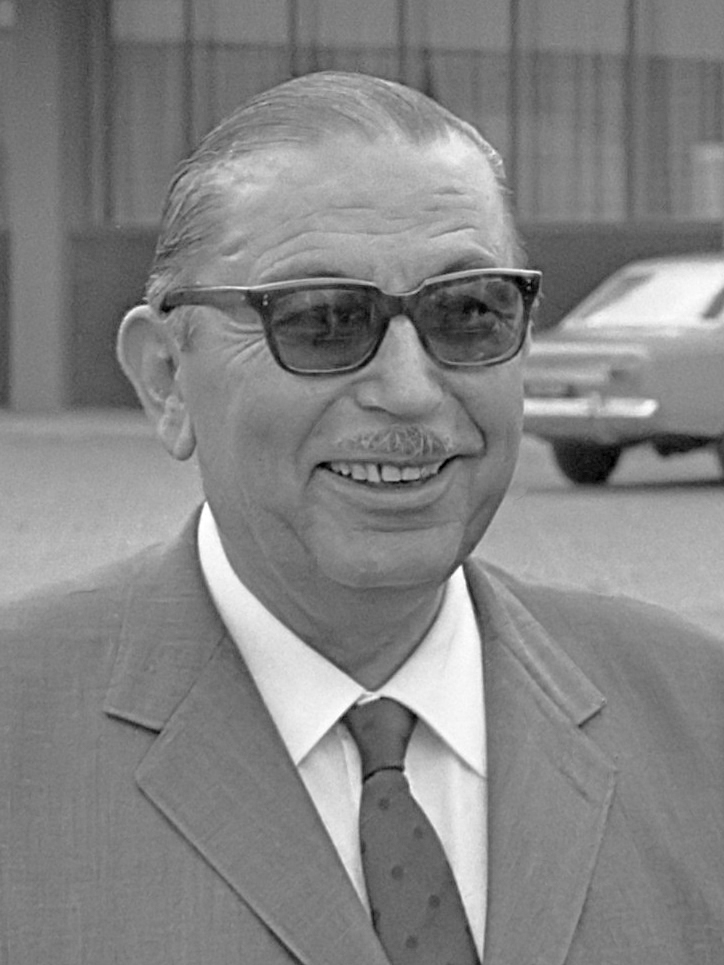
İhsan Sabri Çağlayangil

=== January ===
- January 24 - Uğur Mumcu, investigative journalist (b. 1942)

=== February ===
- February 5 - Adnan Kahveci, politician (b. 1949)
- February 17 - Eşref Bitlis, general of Turkish Gendarmerie (b. 1933)
- February 19 - Yaman Okay, actor (b. 1951)
- February 25 - Eren Özker, puppeteer, performed during the first season of The Muppet Show (b. 1933)

=== March ===
- March 22 - Samiha Ayverdi, writer and Sufi mystic (b. 1905)

=== April ===
- April 17 - Turgut Özal, politician and 8th President of Turkey (b. 1927)

=== May ===
- May 6 - Şükrü Balcı, high-ranking civil servant, governor and chief of police (b. 1929)
- May 9 - Fitnat Özdil, first female sport rowers in Turkey (b. 1910)
- May 26 - Ulvi Yenal, footballer (b. 1908)

=== June ===
- June 12 - Ekrem Koçak, middle distance runner (b. 1931)

=== July ===
- July 2 - People killed during the Sivas massacre
  - Muhlis Akarsu, folk singer and musician (b. 1948)
  - Behçet Aysan, poet (b. 1949)
  - Asım Bezirci, critic, writer and poet (b. 1927)
  - Nesimi Çimen, folk singer and poet (b. 1931)
  - Hasret Gültekin, musician and poet (b. 1971)
- July 7 - Rıfat Ilgaz, writer and poet (b. 1911)
- July 9 - Metin Altıok, poet (b. 1940)
- July 28 - Cemal Madanoğlu, soldier and general (b. 1907)

=== August ===
- August 3 – Vural Arıkan, politician (born 1929)
- August 4 - Sabri Berkel, modernist painter (born 1907)

=== September ===
- September 5 - Samim Kocagöz, novelist (b. 1916)
- September 18 - Nida Tüfekçi, folk music artist (b. 1929)

=== October ===
- 3 October – Mahmut Dikerdem, diplomat and peace activist (born 1916)
- October 6 - Nejat Eczacıbaşı, chemist, industrialist, entrepreneur and philanthropist (b. 1913)
- October 13 - Tekin Arıburun, soldier and statesman (b. 1903)
- October 15 - Aydın Sayılı, historian of science (b. 1913)
- October 22 - Bahtiyar Aydın, army general (b. 1946)

=== November ===
- November 4 - Cem Ersever, commander of Turkish Gendarmerie (b. 1950)

=== December ===
- December 7 - Abidin Dino, painter (b. 1913)
- December 20
  - Hulusi Kentmen, actor (b. 1912)
  - Nazife Güran, composer (b. 1921)
- December 30 - İhsan Sabri Çağlayangil, politician and acting President of Turkey (b. 1908)

== Gallery ==
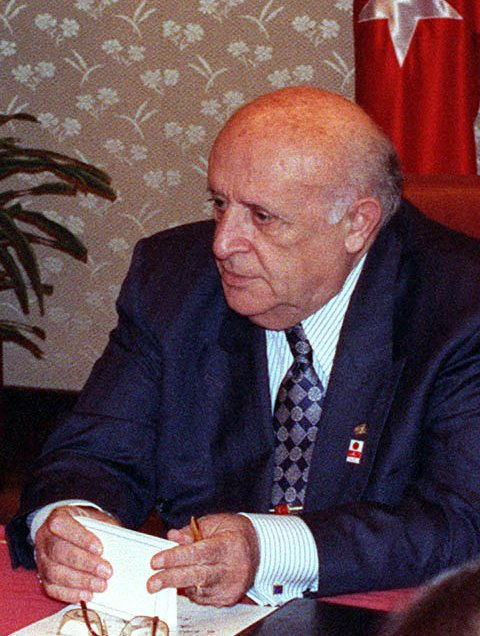
Süleyman Demirel

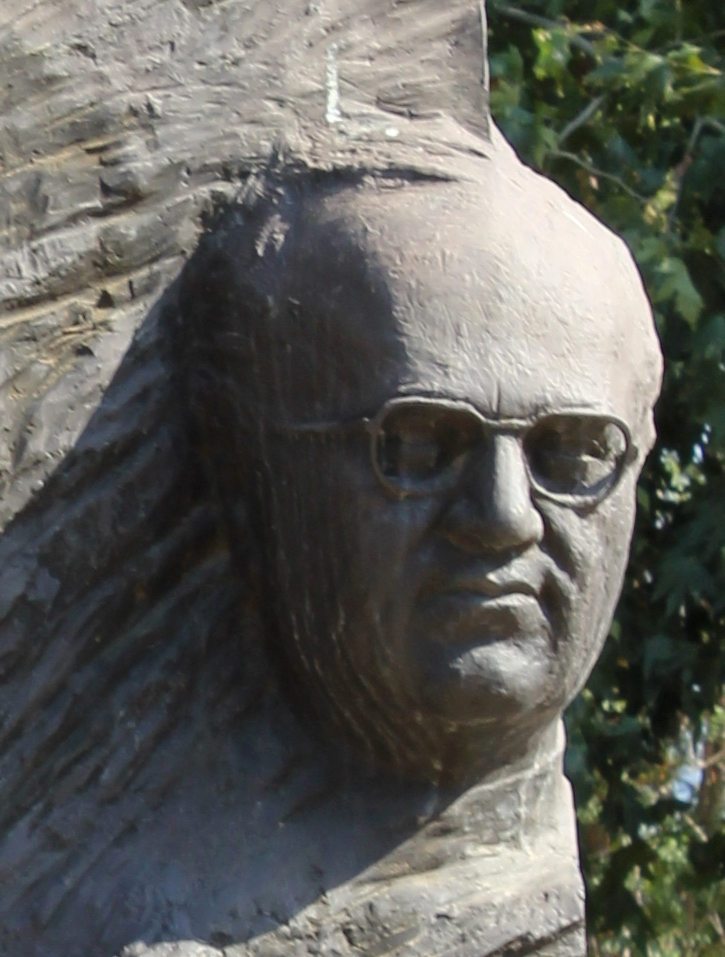
Uğur Mumcu

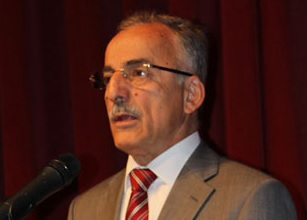
Murat Karayalçın

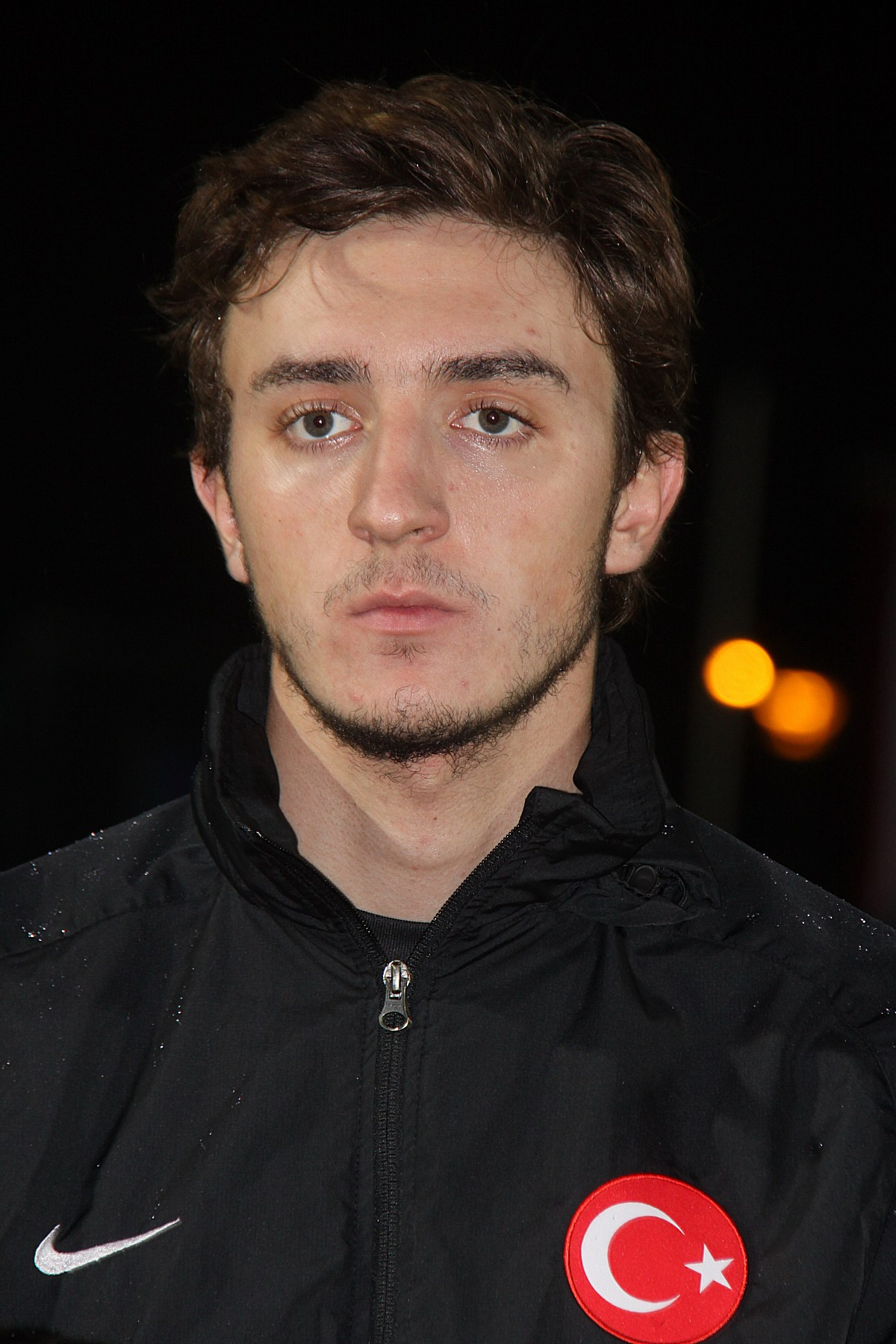
Ozan Evrim Özenç

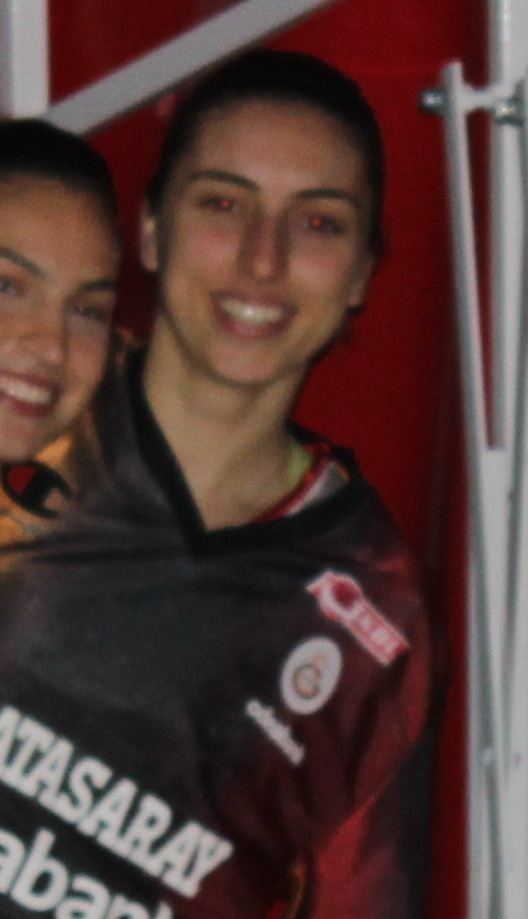
Ayşe Cora

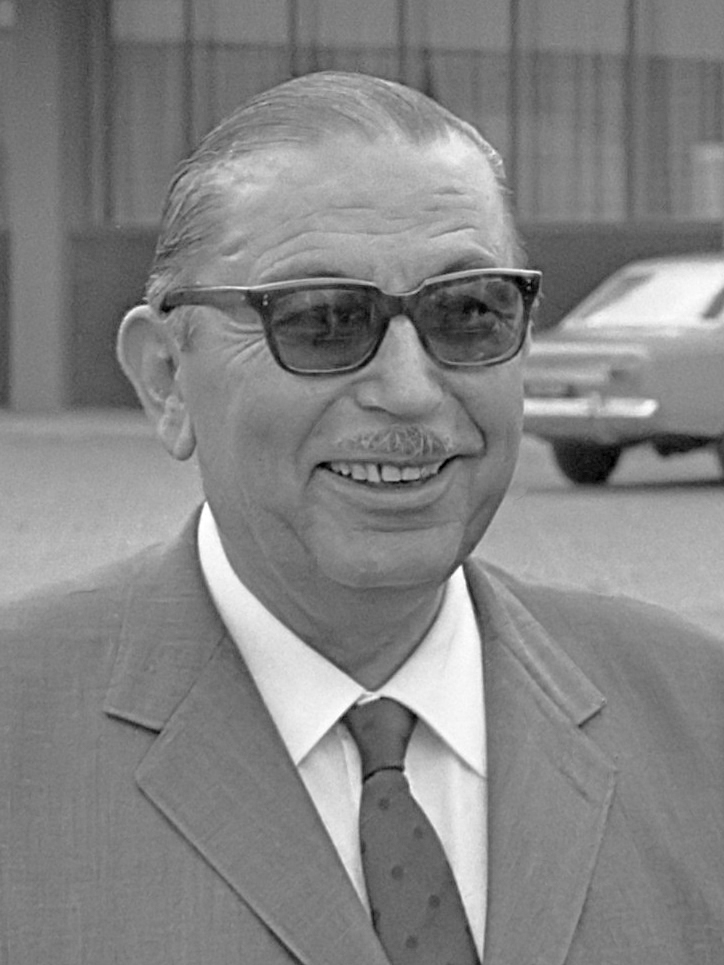
İhsan Sabri Çağlayangil

== See also ==
- 1992-93 1.Lig
- Turkey in the Eurovision Song Contest 1993
