= Asım Akin =

Turkish physician (1940–2024)

Mustafa Asım Akin (1940 in Istanbul – 19 August 2024) was a Turkish physician. He attended the St. Joseph High School in Istanbul and studied at the University of Istanbul at the Medicical School of Çapa. He earned his P.h.D. at the University of Ankara. There he was made a lecturer in 1975 and in 1982 a professor. From 1976 until 1977 he worked interim at the University of Paris. In 1978, he founded the scientific division for nuclear medicine at the University of Ankara.

Akin was married and a father of two children.

== Freemasonry ==
Akin was a member of the Grand Lodge of Free and Accepted Masons of Turkey and, as such, a Freemason. From 2005 until 2007 he was a Grand Master of the Grand Lodge.

In reference to the Justice and Development Party of Turkey, Akin shared in a press interview after his election to the position of Grand Master that he is not concerned about past opposition to Freemasonry from those in power in Turkey.

== See also ==
- List of Turkish physicians
