= Ayhan Sökmen =

Turkish composer and physician

Ayhan Sökmen (1929 – 30 December 2013) was a Turkish composer and physician.

== See also ==
- List of Turkish physicians
