= 1991 in Turkey =

- Centuries: 20th; 21st
- Decades: 1970s; 1980s; 1990s; 2000s; 2010s
- See also: List of years in Turkey

Events in the year 1991 in Turkey.

== Parliament ==
- 18th Parliament of Turkey (up to 20 October)
- 19th Parliament of Turkey

== Incumbents ==
- President – Turgut Özal
- Prime Minister –

Yıldırım Akbulut (up to 23 June)
Mesut Yılmaz (23 June – 20 November)
Süleyman Demirel (from 20 November)

- Leader of the opposition –

Erdal İnönü (up to 20 November)
Mesut Yılmaz (from 20 November)

== Ruling party and the main opposition ==
- Ruling party –

Motherland Party (ANAP) (up to 20 November)
True Path Party (DYP) (from 20 November)

- Main opposition-

Social Democratic Populist Party (SHP) (up to 20 November)
Motherland Party (ANAP) (from 20 November)

== Cabinet ==
- 47th government of Turkey
- 48th government of Turkey
- 49th government of Turkey

== Events ==
- 5 January – Prime minister Yıldırım Akbulut met with the coal mine workers who were on strike.
- 1 April – A tent city in Hakkari Province for Iraqi refugees was founded
- 8 April – It was announced that the number of refugees in Turkey was 300000
- 30 April – A sharp raise in government controlled commodity prices
- 19 May – Beşiktaş won the championship of the Turkish football league
- 9 June – Socialist International summit in Istanbul sponsored by SHP
- 23 June – After the party congress of ANAP Yıldırım Akbulut was replaced by Mesut Yılmaz in the government
- 6 July – Lale Aytaman was appointed as the Muğla Province governor. She was the first female governor
- 7 August – Compulsory education term was increased from 5 years to 8 years .
- 28 August – 52 deaths in an international bus (Iran-Liiban) accident in Ağrı Province
- 20 October – General elections ( DYP 178 seats, ANAP 115 seats, SHP 88 seats, RP 62 seats, DSP 7 seats)
- 20 November – First coalition government (DYP-SHP) of Turkey after 1980 period
- 5 December – An assassination attempt to Doğan Güreş the chief of staff (by poison)

== Births ==
- 3 January – Özgür Çek, footballer
- 30 January – Arzu Karabulut, female footballer
- 24 February – Semih Kaya, footballer
- 1 March – Berkan Afşarlı, footballer
- 1 March – Nazlı Çağla Dönertaş, female yacht racer
- 8 April – Alper Potuk, footballer
- 14 April – Melisa Aslı Pamuk, model
- 3 July – Ezgi Çağlar, female footballer
- 5 July – Günay Güvenç, footballer
- 25 July – Hasan Piker, youtuber
- 13 September – Noyan Öz, footballer
- 17 September – Ali Gökdemir, footballer
- 27 October – Hüseyin Atalay, footballer
- 11 December – Alper Uludağ, footballer

== Deaths ==
- 6 January – Adnan Saygun (born 1907), musician
- 21 March – Vedat Dalokay (born 1927), architect
- 22 April – Feriha Tevfik (born 1910), first beauty pageant of Turkey
- 23 May – Kemal Satır (born 1911) MD, politician
- 2 June – Ahmet Arif (born 1927), poet
- 6 June – Adnan Süvari (born 1926), football coach
- 5 September – Fahrelnissa Zeid (born 1901), painter
- 13 September – Metin Oktay (born 1936) footballer
- 13 October – Adnan Ersöz (born 1917), military general

== Gallery ==
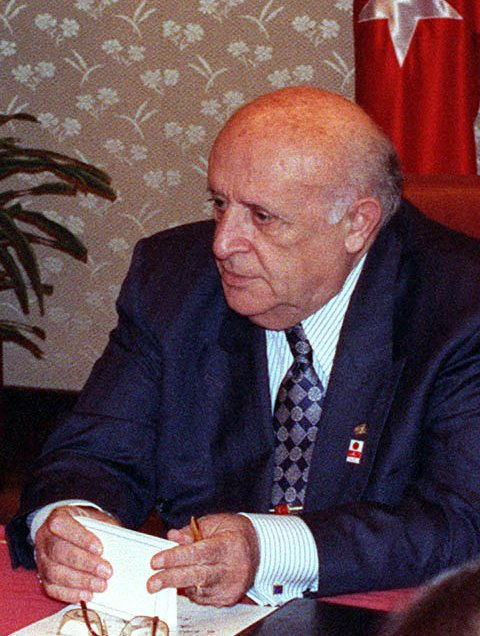
Süleyman Demirel

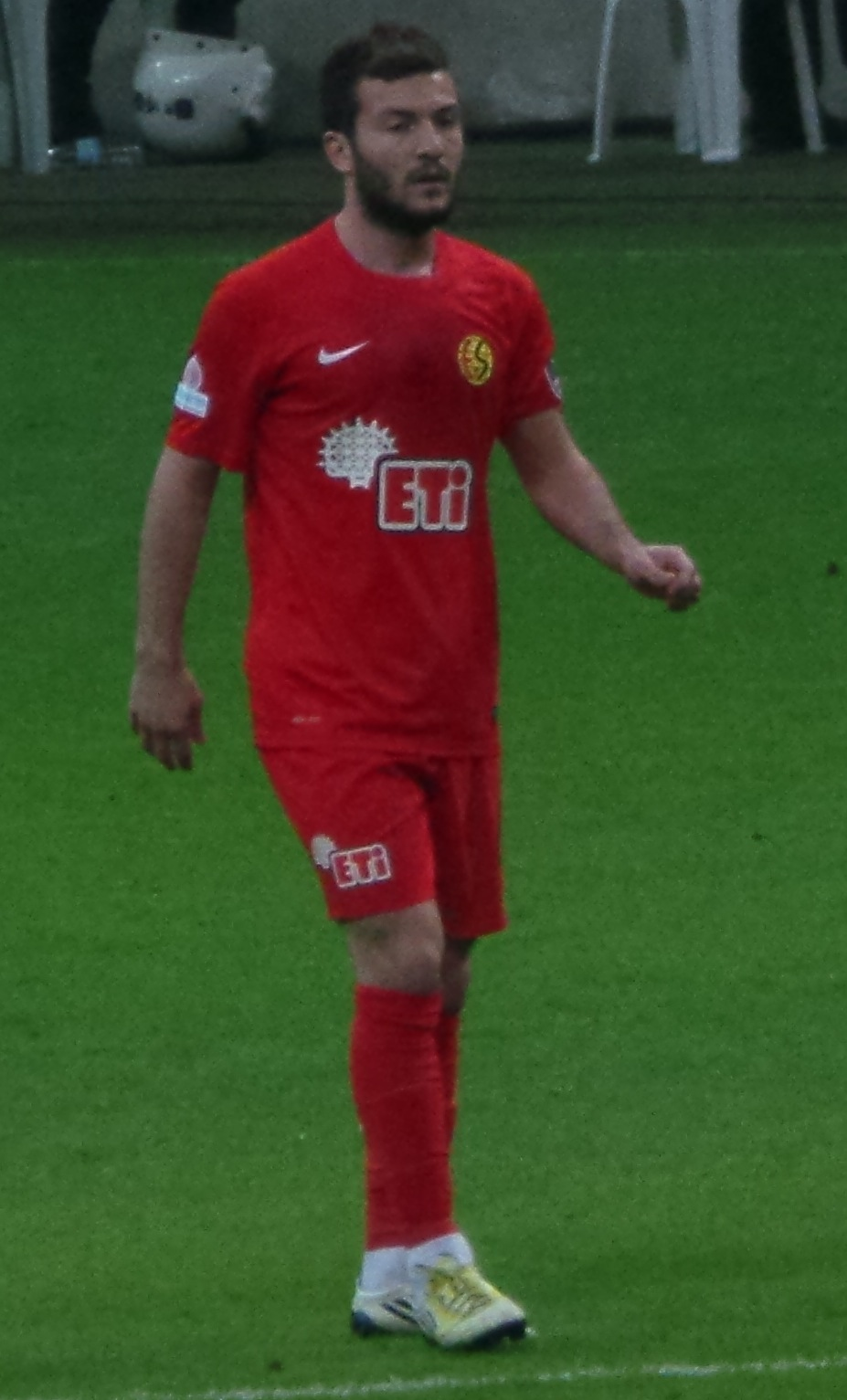
Özgür Çek

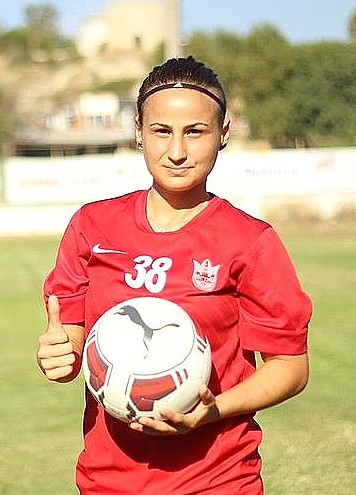
Özgür Karabulut

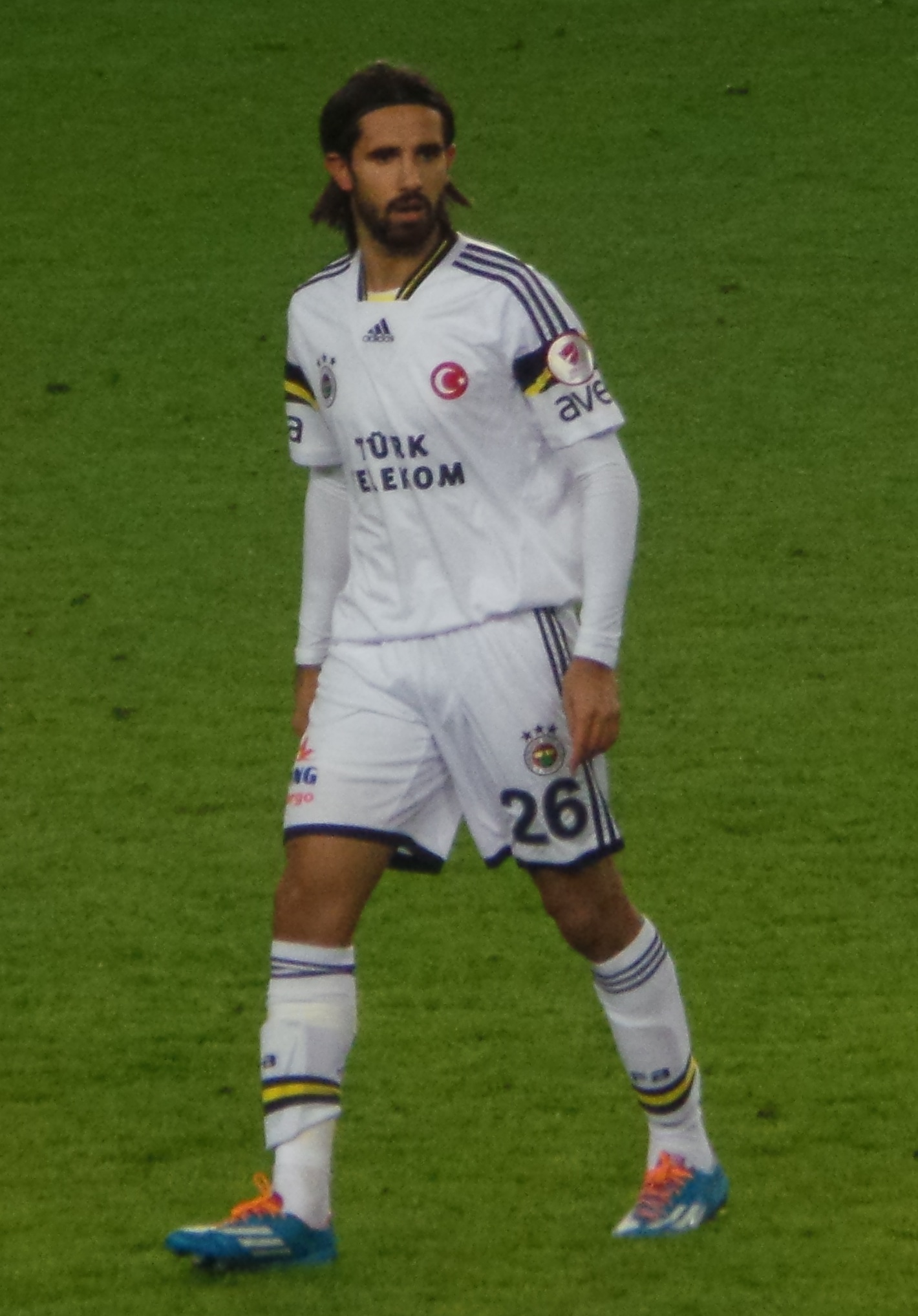
Alper Potuk

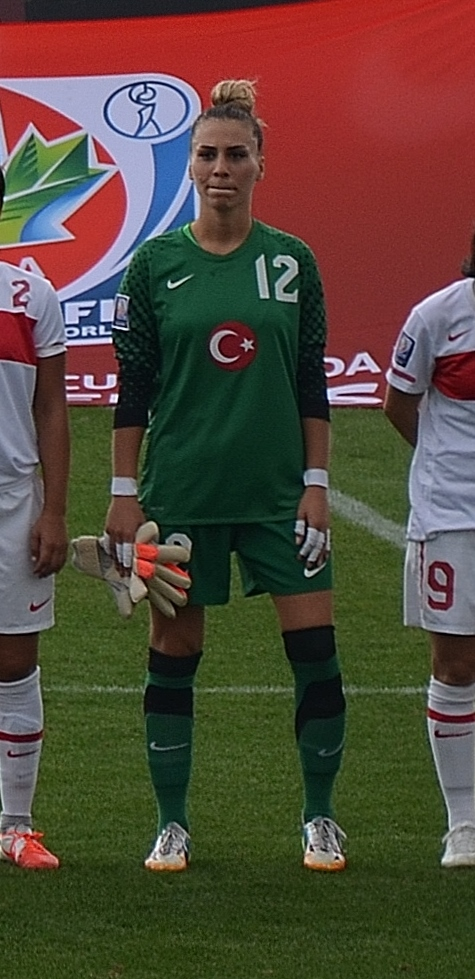
Ezgi Çağlar

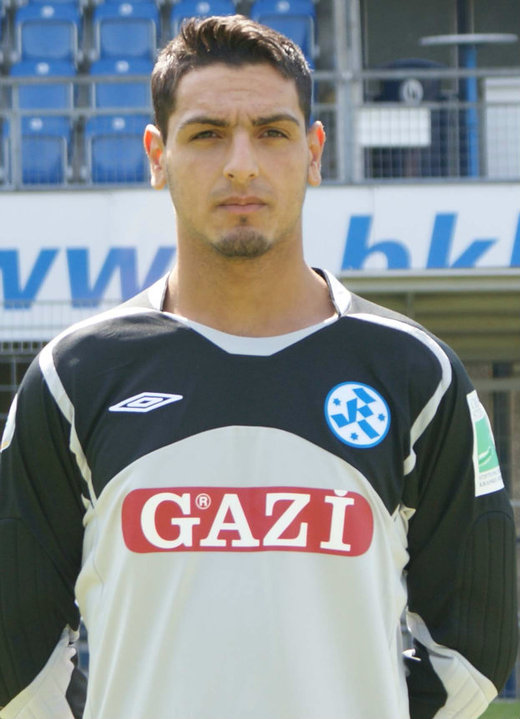
Günay Güvenç

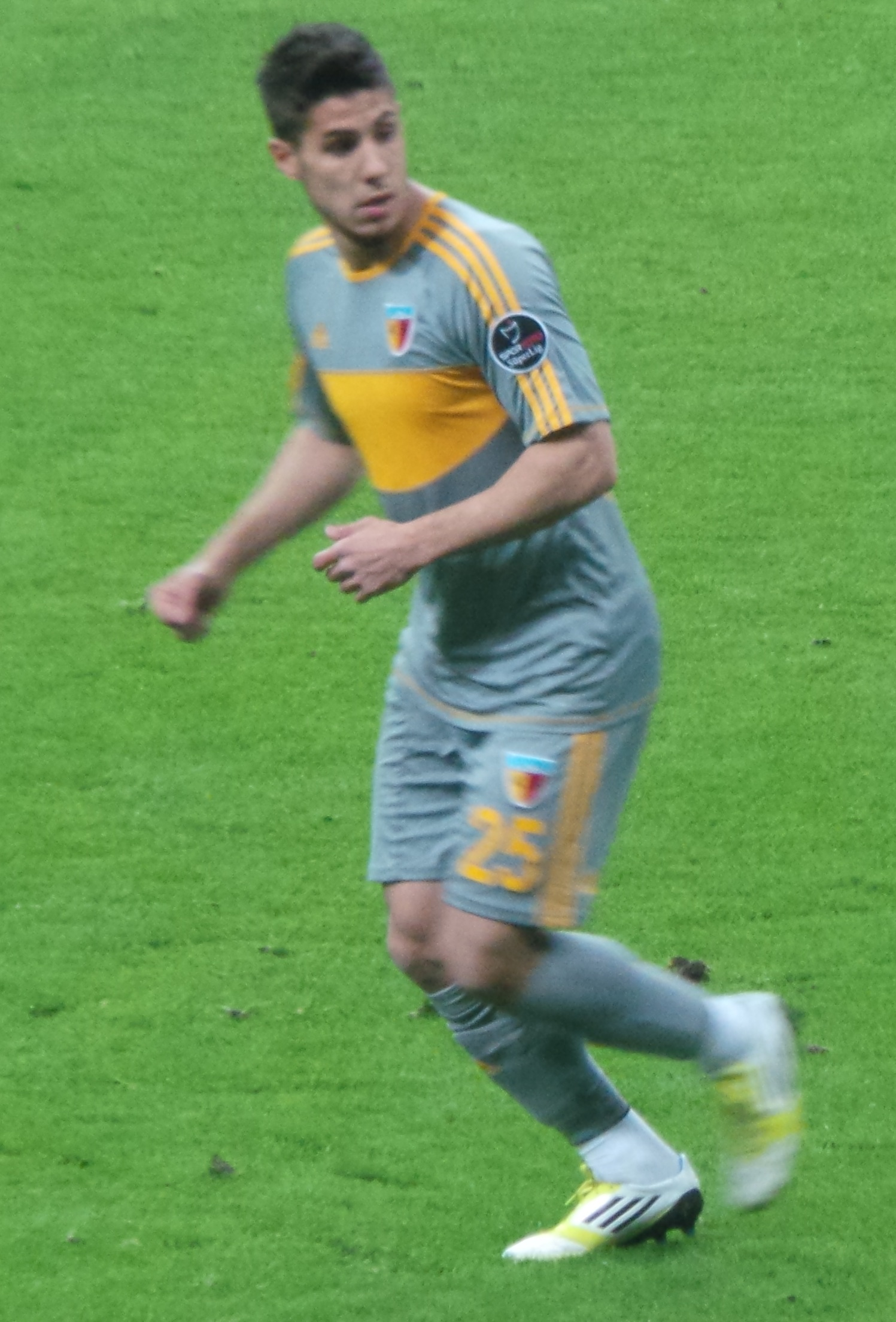
Alper Uludağ

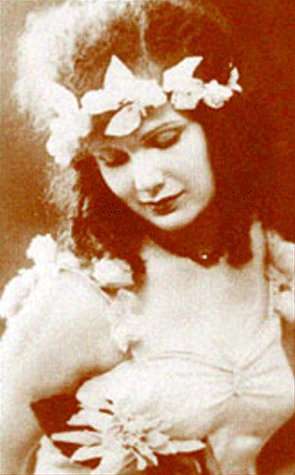
Feriha Tevfik

== See also ==
- 1990–91 1.Lig
- Turkey in the Eurovision Song Contest 1991
