= List of Turkish medical doctors =

A list of notable Turkish medical doctors:

== A ==
- Abdullah Cevdet Karlıdağ
- Aziz Sancar
- Abdülaziz Efendi
- Abdülhak Adnan Adıvar
- Yıldırım Aktuna
- Ali Rıza Pasin
- Asaf Ataseven
- Asım Akin
- Ayhan Sökmen
- Ayşe Olcay Tiryaki

== B ==
- Baha Akşit
- Bedrettin Yıldızeli

== C ==
- Cemil Topuzlu
- Cüneyt Arkın

== H ==
- Hulusi Behçet

== M ==
- Mehmet Öz
- Mustafa Altıoklar

== N ==
- Necati Çelim

== P ==
- Pakize Tarzi

== S ==
- Sabuncuoğlu Şerefeddin
- Safiye Ali

== T ==
- Türkan Saylan
