= Metin Ataseven =

Swedish politician (born 1972)

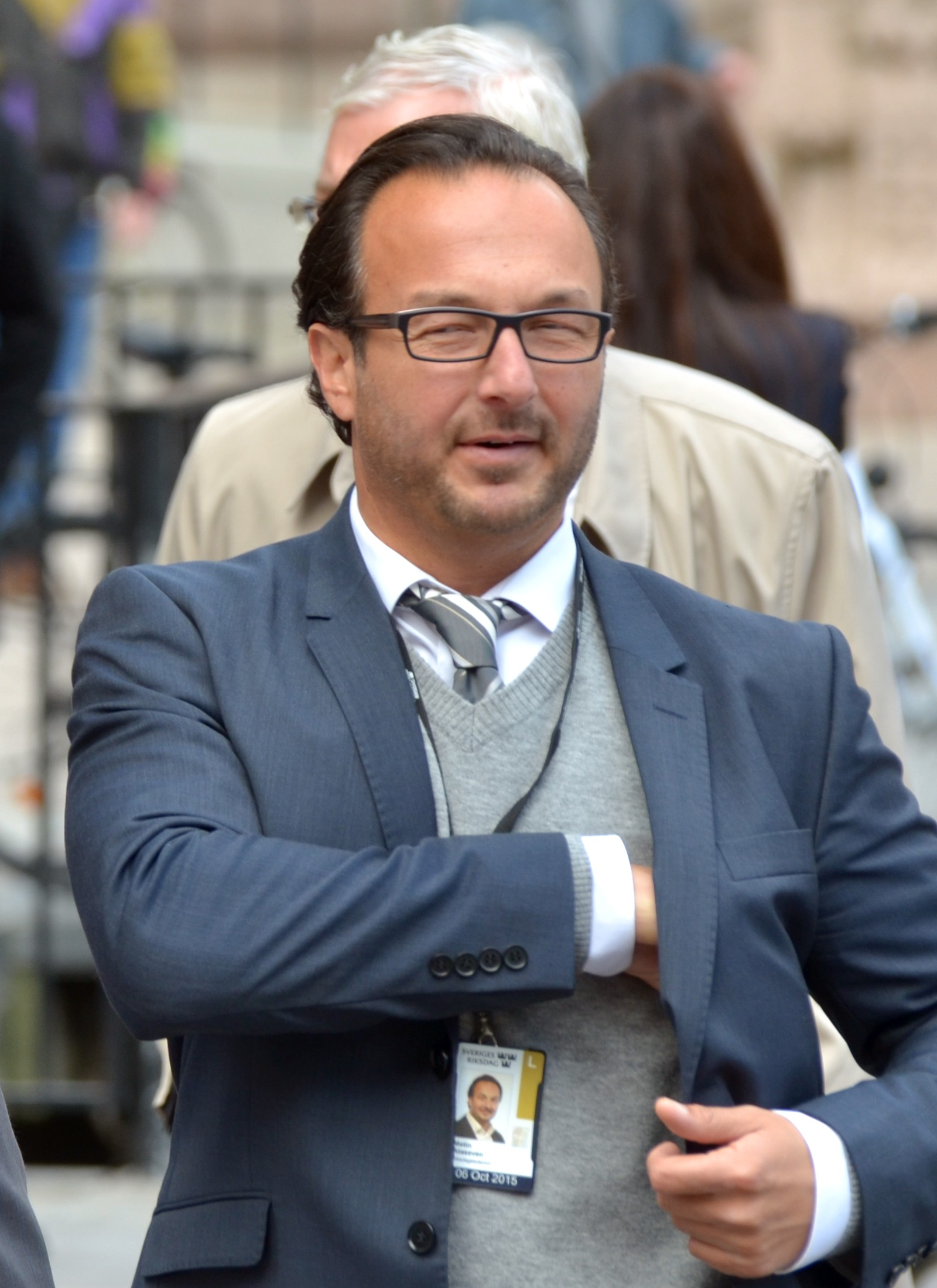
Metin Ataseven

Metin Ataseven (born 1972) is a Swedish politician, representing the Moderate Party in the Riksdag. Ataseven was substitute for Mikael Sandström (2010–12) and for Ewa Björling (2012–13). From 1 January 2013 to October 2014, he was an ordinary member.
