= Murat Soygeniş =

Architect and Professor (born 1961)

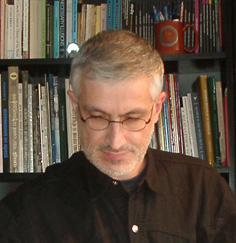
Soygenis in studio

Murat Soygeniş (born 1961) is an internationally recognized architect and professor. He is known for his contributions to architecture, theoretical writing, and teaching.

== Biography ==
Murat Soygeniş is an architect and a professor practicing in Istanbul. He earned his architectural degrees in Istanbul, Turkey (B.Arch., ITU) and in Buffalo New York, USA (M.Arch., University at Buffalo). He served as the Dean of the School of Architecture (YTU). Soygeniş has received architectural awards and has participated in exhibitions, and served as a jury member in many international architectural prizes and competitions. He is a Fellow of the American Institute of Architects, a member of the Chamber of Architects in Istanbul (UIA) and the Royal Institute of British Architects (RIBA).

== Work ==
S+ ARCHITECTURE is an architecture and urban design studio. The studio is affiliated with the Chamber of Architects (UIA), the American Institute of Architects College of Fellows (FAIA), and the Royal Institute of British Architects (RIBA). Sema Soygeniş and Murat Soygeniş are founding partners.

== Lifetime Achievement Awards ==
- University at Buffalo 2025 International Distinguished Alumni Award, Buffalo NY, 2025 (with Sema Soygenis)
- Elevated to AIA College of Fellows FAIA, Washington DC, 2019

== Exhibitions ==
Various personal and group exhibitions of architectural work in the USA, Europe, and Turkey. Projects were on display in Baltimore, Buffalo, Philadelphia, New York, and throughout Turkey, 1981-today:

- Polytechnic University of Turin, School of Architecture, 2007
- Milan Build-Up Expo, 2007
- 20th Century Turkish Architecture, House of Architects Moscow, 2008
- Baltimore American Institute of Architects, Architects' Gallery, 1990, 2002, 2015
- New York University, 2021 (Virtual Exhibition)
- University at Buffalo, School of Architecture and Planning, 2002, 2022, 2024
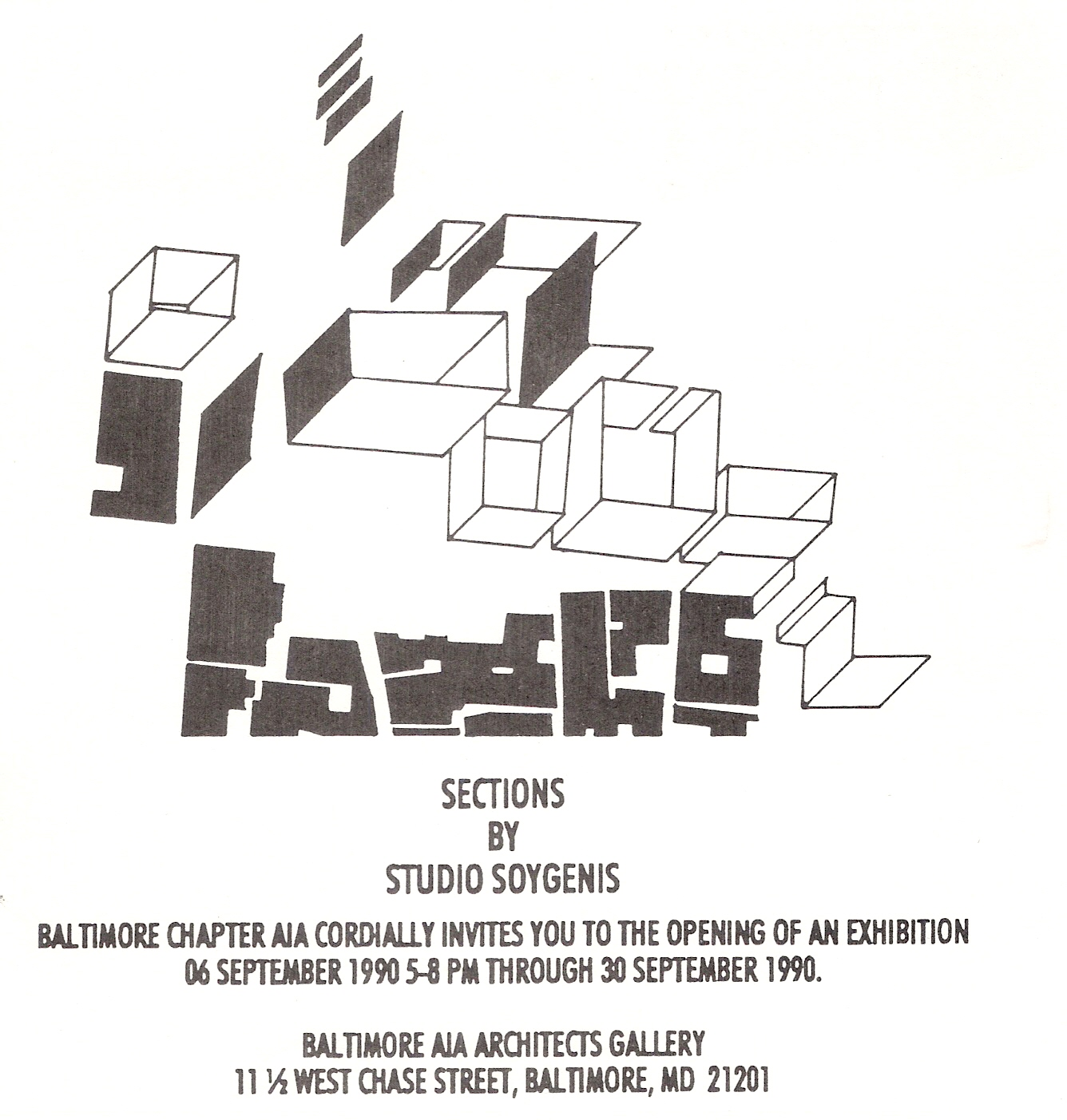
AIA Baltimore Gallery Exhibition 1990

== Publications ==
=== Authored books ===
- Yapi 2 (Building Construction 2), Birsen Yayin, Istanbul, 2000.
- Yapi 3 (Building Construction 3), Birsen Yayin, Istanbul, 2002.
- Yapi 4 (Building Construction 4), Birsen Yayin, Istanbul, 2003.
- Yapi 1-2-3-4 (with Sedad H. Eldem), Birsen Yayin, Istanbul, 2005.
- Istanbul Bir Kent Yorumu / An Urban Commentary (with Sema Soygenis), Birsen Yayin, Istanbul, 2006.
- Turkiye'de Mimarlik (Architecture in Turkey), Canakkale Seramik Kalebodur, Istanbul, 2007.
- Platform for Architecture (with Peter Cook), Aracne, Rome (Italy), May 2011.
- Utopias for Istanbul (with Peter Cook), Aracne, Rome (Italy), May 2011.
- Mimarlik: Yasamin icinden (Architecture: Through life), Birsen Yayin, Istanbul, 2012.
- Mimarlik Mekanlar Gozlemler (Architecture Spaces Observations), YEM Yayin, Istanbul, 2026.

=== Monographs, dedicated and related books ===
- Altinok, S. (Ed.), Sema-Murat Soygenis / Buildings and Projects 1982-1997, Birsen Yayin, Istanbul, 1997.
- Adali, S. (Ed.), Yildiz Bulusmasi: Mimarlik Uygulamalari Tartismasi (Yildiz Meetings: Discussions on Architectural Work), Tasarim Yayin Grubu, Istanbul, 1999.
- Soygenis, M., Tumertekin, H., and others, Ucuncu Mesaj / Third Message, Birsen Yayin, Istanbul, 2000.
- Adali, S. (Ed.), Yildiz Bulusmasi 2001 (Yildiz Meetings 2001), Birsen Yayinevi, Istanbul, 2001.
- Yuksel, E. (Ed.), Sema-Murat Soygenis / Buildings + Projects 2 (Giris / Introduction U. Alsac), Birsen Yayin, Istanbul, 2003.
- Adali, S. (Ed.), Yildiz Bulusmasi 04 (Yildiz Meetings 04), Betonart, Istanbul, 2004.
- Adali, S. (Ed.), bulusmalar 06 meetings / Suha Ozkan - Introduction, Canakkale Seramik Kalebodur, Istanbul, 2007.
- Barbano, G. (Ed.), Architetti 'americani' in Europa - AIA Continental Europe, Aracne, Rome, 2007.
- Soygenis, M., Ozkan, S., et al., Sedat Gurel Projeleri ve Yasami / Projects and Life, Sedat Guzin Gurel Sanat ve Bilim Vakfi, Istanbul, 2008.
- Celik, B. (Ed.), Cifteler kayitlari (Cifteler records), MAT Yapim, Istanbul, 2009.
- Barbano, G. (Ed.), Visioning Architecture: The Sketches of Murat Soygenis (Forewords by Gabriela Goldschmidt, Steve Badanes, Cover text by Andrea Oppenheimer Dean), Aracne Editrice, Rome, 2017.
- Erkan, E. (Ed.), Mimari Izler / Sema Soygenis ve Murat Soygenis'e Armagan (Architectural Paths / A Book Dedicated to Sema Soygenis and Murat Soygenis), YEM Yayin, Istanbul, 2025.
