= Berkin Kamil Arslan =

Turkish footballer (born 1992)

Personal information
- Full name: Berkin Kamil Arslan
- Date of birth: 3 February 1992 (age 34)
- Place of birth: Milas, Turkey
- Height: 1.74 m (5 ft 9 in)
- Position: Winger

Team information
- Current team: Manisa BB
- Number: 17

Youth career
- 2003–2007: Nazilli Belediyespor
- 2007–2009: Galatasaray

Senior career*
| Years | Team | Apps | (Gls) |
| 2009–2012 | Galatasaray A2 | 78 | (20) |
| 2012 | → Kartalspor (loan) | 3 | (0) |
| 2012–2014 | Şanlıurfaspor | 16 | (1) |
| 2014–2016 | Bucaspor | 30 | (1) |
| 2016– | Manisa BB | 25 | (2) |

International career
| 2007 | Turkey U15 | 3 | (3) |
| 2007–2008 | Turkey U16 | 23 | (10) |
| 2008–2009 | Turkey U17 | 20 | (1) |
| 2000–2010 | Turkey U18 | 8 | (0) |
| 2010–2011 | Turkey U19 | 3 | (0) |
- * Club domestic league appearances and goals as of 28 November 2016

Berkin Kamil Arslan (born 3 February 1992) is a Turkish footballer who currently plays as a winger for Manisa BB.

In June 2007, he signed a three-year contract with Galatasaray which was later extended by another two years. After 78 matches for the reserve team he joined Kartalspor on loan in January 2012. His contract with Galatasaray expired in May 2012 and he joined Şanlıurfaspor.
