= Ayşe Olcay Tiryaki =

Turkish physician

- Born: 1 September 1955; Eskişehir, Turkey
- Died: 24 March 2008 (aged 52); Ankara, Turkey
- Cause of death: Murdered
- Burial place: Karşıyaka Cemetery, Ankara
- Other name: Ayşe Olcay Tiryaki Aydıntuğ
- Occupation: University professor
- Spouse: Semih Aydıntuğ (m. 1981–2005)
- Children: 1
- Awards: Scientific and Technological Research Council of Turkey (TÜBİTAK)

Academic background
- Education: Medicine
- Alma mater: Ankara University

Academic work
- Sub-discipline: Immunology, rheumatology

Ayşe Olcay Tiryaki (1 September 1955 – 24 March 2008) was a Turkish professor of clinical immunology and rheumatology. She was an academic at the Faculty of Medicine in Ankara University. She was awarded a prize by the Scientific and Technological Research Council of Turkey (TÜBİTAK) in 1999 for her research on the inflammatory disorder Behçet's disease. She was murdered by her daughter in 2008.

== Personal life ==
Ayşe Olcay Tiryaki was born in Eskişehir, Turkey on 1 September 1955. She had a sister Fatoş Tiryaki.

She married surgeon Semih Aydıntuğ in 1981, and they had one daughter Başak together. The couple divorced in 2005. Başak lived with her father until he remarried, and then with her mother.

== Education ==
Tiryaki graduated from TED Ankara College in 1974, and entered Faculty of Medicine at Ankara University the same year. After completing her undergraduate education in 1980, she worked as a research assistant in the Department of Psychiatry at the same faculty until 1982. She then worked as an internal medicine specialist at the Faculty of Medicine from 1983 to 1988. She completed a compulsory service in the Immunology Department in 1989. Between April and July the same year, she conducted research in the Immunology Institute at the Free University of Berlin in Germany. She specialized in Clinical immunology between 1990 and 1992, and became a subspecialist in immunology.

== Career ==
After completing a British Council Fellowship at the University of London, she was appointed on 4 February 1992 as an associate professor in the Division of Clinical Immunology and Rheumatology, Ankara University. On 5 October 1992, she becameassociate professor, and on 4 September 1995, she was appointed to associate professor position.

She was promoted to full professor on 16 June 1998. She later served as vice dean of the medical school. She was also coordinator for MEDINE, the thematic network on Medical Education in Europe).

Olcay Tiryaki's medical research focused on connective tissue disorders and inflammatory conditions, include Behçet's disease and lupus. She was awarded a prize by the Scientific and Technological Research Council of Turkey (TÜBİTAK) in 1999 for her research on Behçet's disease.

She served as an assistant dean at the Faculty of Medicine in Ankara University between January 2000 and May 2005.

She published 38 international articles, one international book, 59 international printed communiqués, 42 articles in Turkish, 26 books in Turkish, one book translation and 45 printed communiqués in Turkish. She also served as coordinator in a book.

== Death ==
Olcay Tiryaki was found dead as her throat slit at her home in Beysukent at 4:00 hours local time on 24 March 2008. She was stabbed by her daughter, 21-year old Başak Aydıntuğ, who was a law student at Bilkent University, and had received psychological treatment in 2005 and 2007. Başak Aydıntuğ initially claimed an intruder had committed the murder. But she later confessed when her fingerprints were found on the murder weapon. She was sentenced to life imprisonment for the murder. Ayşe Olcay Tiryaki was buried at Karşıyaka Cemetery in Ankara after a memorial ceremony held at the Faculty of Medicine of Ankara University and the religious service in Kocatepe Mosque.

== See also ==
- List of Turkish physicians
