= Kuzeybatı =

Turkish real estate company

Kuzeybatı Worldwide Services
- Company type: Public
- Industry: estate agents
- Founded: 1994
- Headquarters: Istanbul, TR
- Key people: Murat Ergin, Chairman
- Number of employees: 24(2009)
- Website: www.kuzeybati.com.tr

Kuzeybatı Worldwide Real Estate Services is a Turkish-based firm of real estate services.

== History ==
The Company was established by Murat Ergin in 1994 in Istanbul. In 2006 Kuzeybatı has become an international associate of Savills.

== Services ==
Kuzeybatı offers advisory and consultancy services in site selection, valuation, feasibility, investment, project development, and property management.
