= Ali Rıza Pasin =

Turkish physician

Ali Rıza Pasin (1890–1946) was a Turkish physician.

== See also ==
- List of Turkish physicians
