= Baha Akşit =

Turkish physician and politician

Mehmet Bahattin Baha Akşit
- Born: March 6, 1914; Yatağan, Denizli
- Died: September 27, 1995 (aged 78); Istanbul
- Occupations: physician, politician

Baha Akşit (March 6, 1914, Yatağan, Denizli – September 27, 1995, Istanbul) was a Turkish physician and politician. He served as a member of the Grand National Assembly and of the Senate of the Republic.

Akşit was sentenced to death in 1961 after the overthrow of the government led by Adnan Menderes.

== See also ==
- List of Turkish physicians
