= Mehmet Köksal =

Turkish lawyer, and lecturer

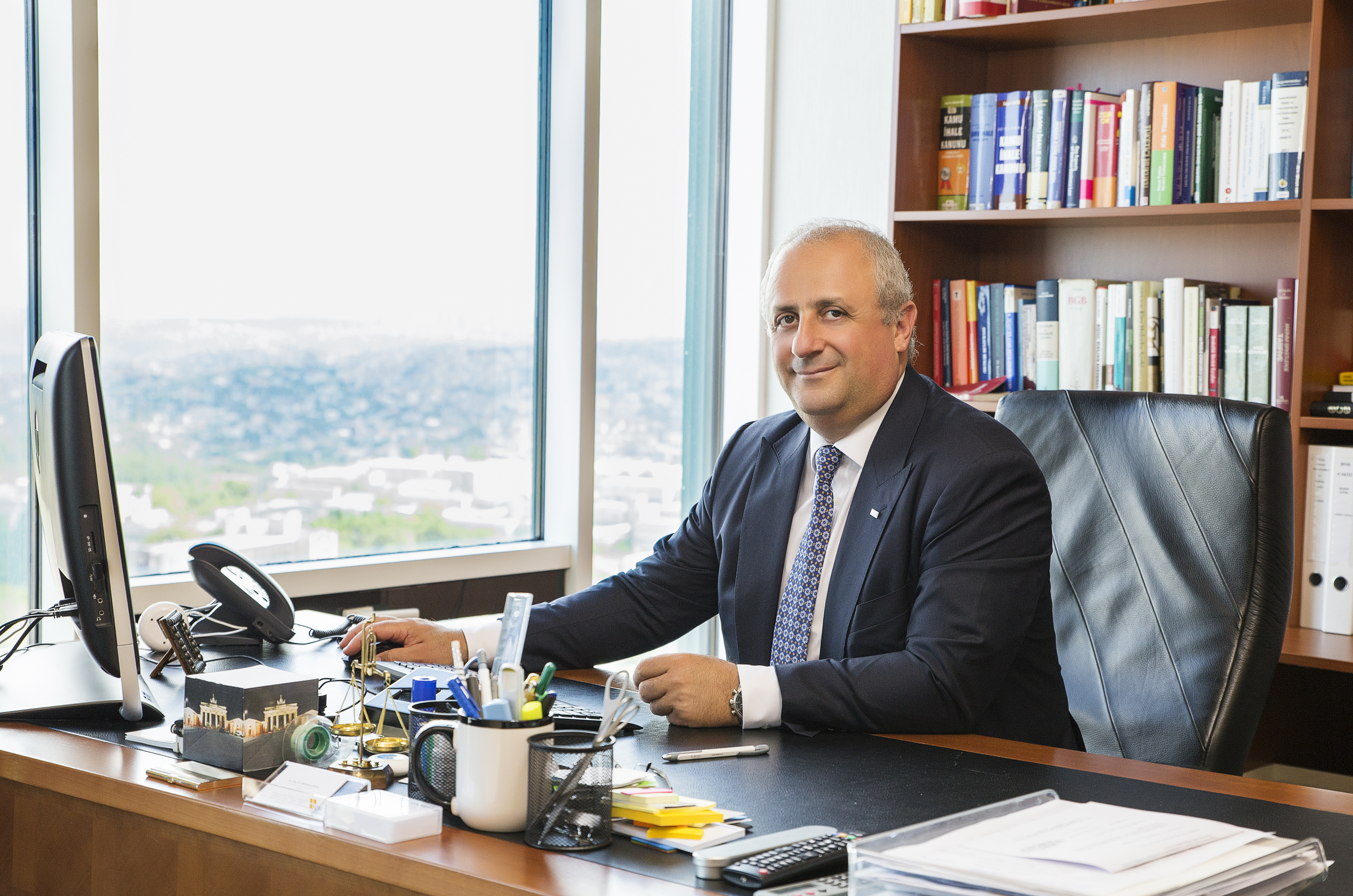
- Born: August 9, 1963 (age 63); Rize, Turkey
- Education: Ankara University; University of Konstanz
- Occupations: Lawyer, lecturer, author
- Employer: Köksal Attorney Partnership
- Known for: Founding partner of Köksal Attorney Partnership

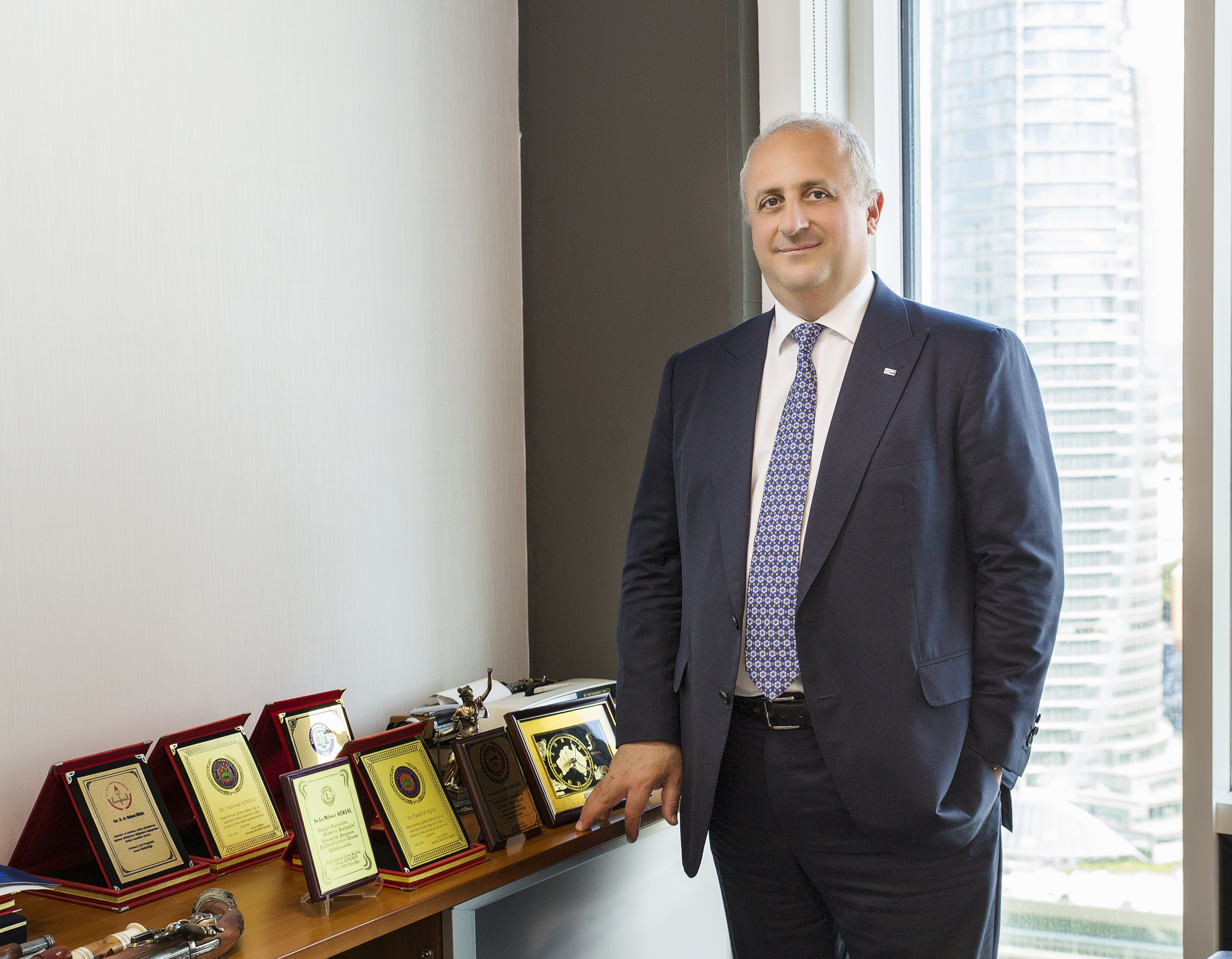
Köksal in his Istanbul office

Mehmet Köksal (born August 9, 1963) is a Turkish lawyer and founding partner of the Istanbul and Munich based law firm Köksal Attorney Partnership.

== Early life and education ==
Köksal was born in Rize, Turkey. His mother was an English teacher and his father (Tekin Köksal) was a judge.

He attended the Kabatas Erkek Lisesi boarding school in Istanbul and later graduated at the Ankara University Law Faculty in 1986. Following his graduation, Köksal worked at the Gazi University as a research assistant until he was granted a scholarship for a PhD degree at the Konstanz University Law Faculty which he completed in 1995.

== Professional history ==
=== Academia ===
Since 1996, Köksal has acted as an instructor and lecturer of commercial and corporate law, property law, contract law, and consumer protection law at various law schools. He is one of the founders of the Faculty of law at the Near East University in Nicosia, Cyprus and has given lectures there. Köksal also holds seminars at the Georg-Simon-Ohm-Hochschule in Nürnberg, Germany.

=== Publications ===
Köksal has written 16 books and several essays. Some of his notable books are:

- "60 Fragen und Antworten zum Türkischen Arbeits- und Arbeitssicherheitsrecht"
- "Das Neue Türkische Zivilgesetzbuch"
- "Das Neue Türkische Gesellschaftsrecht"
- "Ausländische Direktinvestitionen und Arbeitserlaubnis Bestimmungen"

=== Law firm ===
Köksal founded his own law firm in 1987. In 2007, Köksal turned his law office into a partnership and continued his work, together with his partners, under the new name of Köksal Attorney Partnership. Today the firm operates in Turkish, German and English. Its office is located in Istanbul. Clients range from government officials to multinational companies. The firm has done M&A deals for companies such as eBay, PayPal, and Wall AG, as well as labour law agreements for companies such as Kempinski, GEA, and Erciyas Holding.

=== Other functions ===
Besides his activities as a lawyer and lecturer, Köksal holds several other positions in various organisations:

- President of the AHK Istanbul Arbitration Court
- Auditor of the Swiss Chamber of Commerce in Turkey
- Head of Turkey Directorate of the Diplomatic Council
- Member of the board of the DMW International Diplomats e.V.
- Representative of German - Turkish Economic Relations of the Wirtschaftsrat der CDU e.V.
- Turkey Director of the Verband Deutscher Anwälte

== Philanthropy ==
Köksal has acted as:

- Vice Chairman of the Ashoka Turkey Foundation
- Member of the board of the Yeniden Biz Foundation
- Member of the board of the Açık Açık Foundation
