= Mükerrem Sarol =

Turkish physician and politician (1909–1995)

Minister of State
- In office 1954 – 12 October 1955
- President: Celal Bayar
- Prime Minister: Adnan Menderes

Personal details
- Born: Ahmet Mükerrem; 1909 Tripoli, Ottoman Empire
- Died: 8 November 1995 (aged 85–86) Istanbul, Turkey
- Party: Democrat Party; Justice Party
- Children: 3
- Education: Darülfünun; University of Hamburg

Mükerrem Sarol (1909 – 8 November 1995) was a Turkish physician and politician. He was one of the founders of the Democrat Party (DP) which ruled Turkey between 1950 and 1960. Kemal Karpat describes him as part of the "rising professionals" within the early DP leadership. Sarol served at the Parliament for three terms during the rule of the DP and was the minister of state from 1954 to 1955 in the cabinet led by Prime Minister Adnan Menderes. Sarol was arrested following the military coup on 27 May 1960 and was imprisoned between 1960 and 1965.

== Early life and education ==
His father, Osman Nuri Bey, was a military officer in the Ottoman army and was serving in Tripoli, Ottoman Lebanon, in 1909 when he was born. Osman Nuri Bey was originally from Gediz, Kütahya, and belonged to a family consisting of military officers. His mother was Fatma Zehra Hanım.

He was educated in different cities due to his father's military service. He graduated from the School of Medicine at Darülfünun, precursor of Istanbul University, in 1930. He received his further medical training on gynecology and obstetrics at the University of Hamburg becoming a surgeon in 1938.

== Career and activities ==
Following his graduation Sarol worked as a surgeon in Yozgat and Aydın. Then he was involved in private medical practice in Aydın where he met Adnan Menderes, a native of the city.

Sarol's political career began in 1946 when he contributed to the establishment of the local branch of the DP in Aydın. He settled in Istanbul 1947 and worked at the DP's Istanbul branch. He was elected as a deputy from Istanbul in the general election held on 14 May 1950. Shortly after this he became a member of the DP's administrative board. He founded an Istanbul-based newspaper entitled Türk Sesi (Turkish: Voice of Turk) in 1954. He won his seat in the next general elections on 2 May 1954. He was elected as a deputy from Edirne in the general election on 27 October 1957.

Sarol was appointed minister of state to the third cabinet formed by Adnan Menderes in May 1954. Sarol was in charge of press and political affairs and had to leave his newspaper following his ministerial appointment as a result of the harsh criticisms of the opposition. Sarol was subject to frequent corruption allegations during his tenure which were about the use of the government support for his paper in the form of official advertisements and forced subscriptions. There were other accusations about him in relation to his membership to the Etiler Housing Cooperative in 1954. It was alleged that Sarol had employed extra and unlawful credit from the Turkish Real Estate and Credit Bank for his house, and had been involved in the importation of extra iron for construction of the cooperative to sell it on the black market.

Due to these accusations Prime Minister Menderes asked his resignation on 9 October 1955. Sarol's tenure ended on 12 October 1955. He was elected as a member of the DP's administrative board in November 1955. He was dismissed from the DP on 2 December 1955. He returned the party in June 1957.

Sarol was made a member of the commission which was established by the DP on 6 April 1960 to investigate the activities of the opposition party, Republican People's Party (CHP). Its task was to produce evidence to initiate an inquiry against the CHP at the Parliament. Sarol was elected as the chairman of the commission on 7 April.

=== Arrest and later life ===
Immediately after the military coup on 27 May 1960 Sarol along with other DP politicians was arrested. He was tried by the Supreme Court of Justice in Yassıada from 14 October 1960 and sentenced to fifteen years in prison. The state took the ownership of his properties, including his house in Etiler, Istanbul, in 1961. He was released from prison on 15 January 1965 due to his deteriorating health condition.

Sarol joined the Justice Party in 1975.

== Personal life and death ==
Sarol was married to Faliha Sarol and had three children. He was fluent in French and German languages. He died in Istanbul on 8 November 1995.

=== Work ===
Sarol published a book on Adnan Menderes in 1983.
