= Asaf Ataseven =

Turkish physician

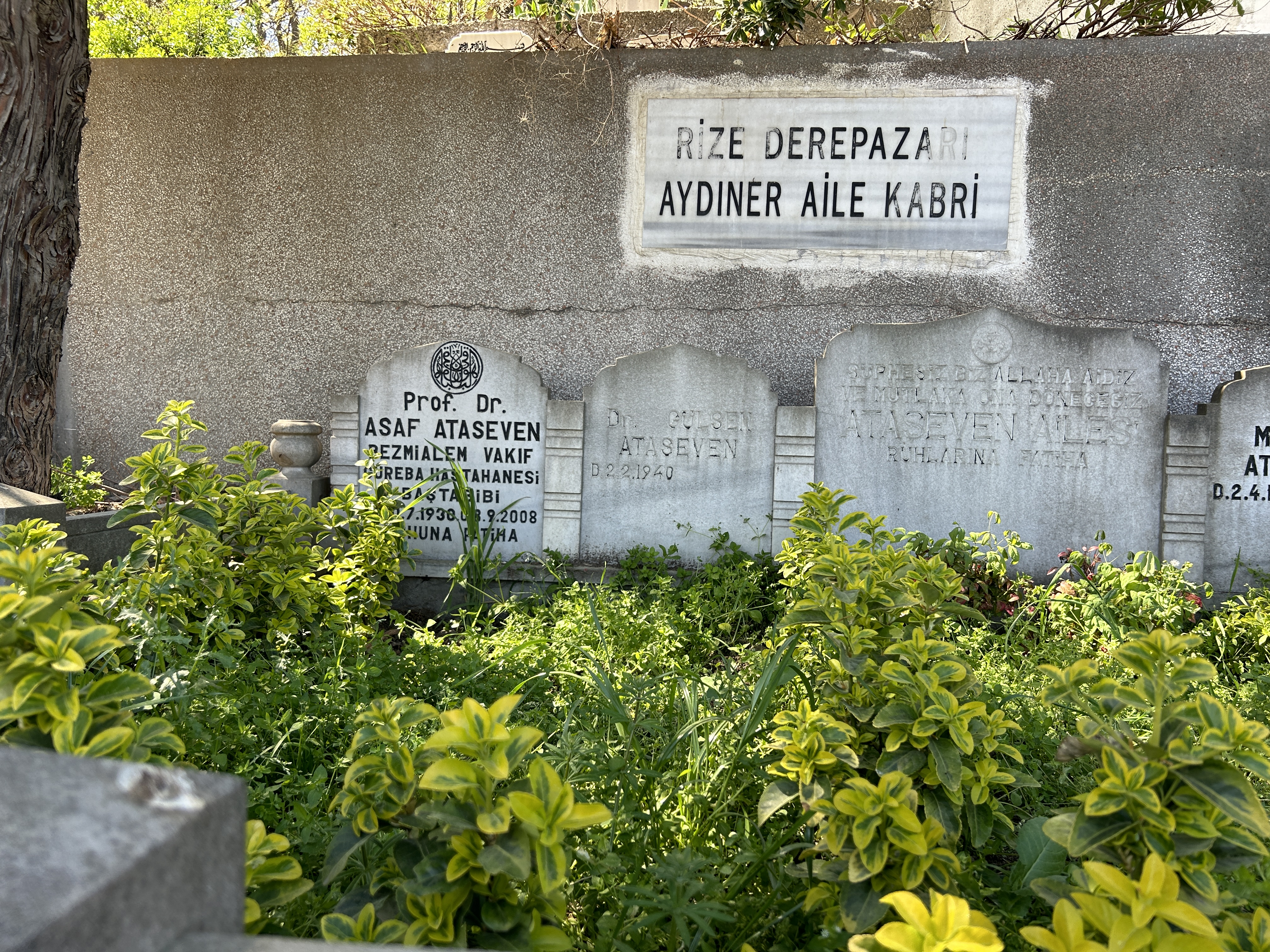
Ataseven's grave

Asaf Ataseven (1932–2003) was a Turkish doctor who served as chief physician at Gureba Hospital in Istanbul.

== See also ==
- List of Turkish physicians
