= Barış Örücü =

Turkish footballer

Personal information
- Date of birth: 10 May 1992 (age 34)
- Place of birth: Krefeld, Germany
- Height: 1.83 m (6 ft 0 in)
- Positions: Attacking midfielder; winger

Team information
- Current team: Nazilli Belediyespor

Youth career
- –2008: Bayer 04 Leverkusen
- 2008–2011: MSV Duisburg

Senior career*
Years	Team	Apps	(Gls)
2011–2013	Bursaspor	7	(0)
2013–2014	Denizlispor	34	(6)
2014–2015	Konyaspor	6	(0)
2015–2016	Alanyaspor	24	(5)
2016–2018	Denizlispor	64	(12)
2018–2019	İstanbulspor	17	(2)
2020	Sakaryaspor	4	(0)
2023–	Nazilli Belediyespor	0	(0)

International career
2009–2010	Germany U18	5	(0)
2014	Turkey A2	1	(0)
- * Club domestic league appearances and goals as of 18 August 2023

Barış Örücü (born 10 May 1992) is a footballer who plays as an attacking midfielder or winger for Nazilli Belediyespor. Born in Germany, he represented Germany at under-18 youth level before being selected for Turkey's 'A2' team.

== Career ==
He made his Süper Lig debut against Manisaspor on 30 October 2011.

Örücü has played for Germany on international level and appeared on five occasions for the German U18, before deciding to represent Turkey.
