= 2004 in Turkey =

- Centuries: 20th; 21st
- Decades: 1980s; 1990s; 2000s; 2010s; 2020s
- See also: List of years in Turkey

Events in the year 2004 in Turkey.

== Incumbents ==
- Ahmet Necdet Sezer, President, 2000–2007
- Recep Tayyip Erdoğan, Prime Minister, 2003–2014

=== Governors ===
- Adana: Cahit Kıraç
- Adıyaman: Halil Işık
- Afyonkarahisar: Muzaffer Dilek
- Ağrı: Hüseyin Atak
- Aksaray: Hüseyin Avni Coş
- Amasya: Erhan Tanju
- Ankara: Kemal Önal
- Antalya: Alaaddin Yüksel
- Ardahan: Murat Yıldırım
- Artvin: M. Selahattin Aparcı
- Aydın: Mustafa Malay
- Balıkesir: Selahattin Hatipoğlu
- Bartın: Fatih Eryılmaz
- Batman: Halil İbrahim Daşöz
- Bayburt: Asaf Hacımustafaoğlu
- Bilecik: Ayhan Çevik
- Bingöl: Vehbi Avuç
- Bitlis: Aslan Kütükçü
- Bolu: Ali Serindağ
- Burdur: Can Direkçi
- Bursa: Nihat Canpolat
- Çanakkale: Orhan Kırlı
- Çankırı: Ali Haydar Öner
- Çorum: Hüseyin Poroy
- Denizli: Recep Yazıcıoğlu
- Diyarbakır: Nusret Miroğlu (left office in September 2004) / Efkan Ala (assumed office in September 2004)
- Düzce: Fuat Gürel
- Edirne: Nusret Miroğlu (assumed office in September 2004)
- Elazığ: Kadir Çakır
- Erzincan: Ali Güngör
- Erzurum: Celalettin Güvenç
- Eskişehir: Kadir Çalışkan
- Gaziantep: Lütfullah Bilgin
- Giresun: Şükrü Kocatepe
- Gümüşhane: Veysel Dalmaz
- Hakkari: Ayhan Nasuhbeyoğlu
- Hatay: Ahmet Kayhan
- Iğdır: Halil Ulusoy
- Isparta: Isa Parlak
- İstanbul: Muammer Güler
- İzmir: Oğuz Kağan Köksal
- Kahramanmaraş: Ilhan Atış
- Karabük: Muzaffer Ecemiş
- Karaman: Hasan Basri Güzeloğlu
- Kars: Nevzat Turhan
- Kastamonu: Must Kara
- Kayseri: Osman Güneş
- Kırıkkale: Ali Kolat
- Kırklareli: Hüseyin Avni Coş
- Kırşehir: Selahattin Hatipoğlu
- Kilis: Aslan Kütükçü
- Kocaeli: Gökhan Sözer
- Konya: Ahmet Kayhan
- Kütahya: Şükrü Kocatepe
- Malatya: Osman Derya Kadıoğlu
- Manisa: Refik Arslan Öztürk
- Mardin: Temel Koçaklar
- Mersin: Atilla Osmançelebioğlu
- Muğla: Lütfi Yiğenoğlu
- Muş: İlker Gündüzöz
- Nevşehir: Alaattin Turhan
- Niğde: Gazi Şimşek
- Ordu: Said Vakkas Gözlügöl
- Osmaniye: Ali Yerlikaya
- Rize: Enver Salihoğlu
- Sakarya: M. Cahit Kıraç
- Samsun: Mustafa Demir
- Siirt: Nuri Okutan
- Sinop: Zeki Şanal
- Sivas: Hasan Canpolat
- Şanlıurfa: Yusuf Yavaşcan
- Şırnak: Osman Güneş
- Tekirdağ: Cengiz Aydoğdu
- Tokat: Ayhan Nasuhbeyoğlu
- Trabzon: Aslan Yıldırım (left office in September 2004) / Hüseyin Yavuzdemir (assumed office in September 2004)
- Tunceli: Mustafa Erkal
- Uşak: Ali Fuat Atik
- Van: Niyazi Tanılır
- Yalova: Yusuf Erbay
- Yozgat: Gökhan Sözer
- Zonguldak: Yavuz Erkmen

== Deaths ==
=== February ===
- February 1 - Suha Arın, film director, writer and producer (b. 1942)
- February 7 - Birol Pekel, footballer (b. 1938)
- February 8 - Cem Karaca, rock musician and Anatolian Rock legend (b. 1945)

=== March ===
- March 18 - Yavuz Selekman, wrestler and film actor (b. 1937)

=== April ===
- April 10 - Sakıp Sabancı, businessman and philanthropist (b. 1933)
- April 18 - Gürdal Duyar, sculptor (b. 1935)
- April 21 - Rıza Doğan, Oliympic wrestler (b. 1931)
- April 24 - Feridun Karakaya, comedy actor (b. 1928)

=== May ===
- May 18 - Çetin Alp, singer (b. 1947)
- May 29 - Kâni Karaca, religious singer (b. 1930)

=== June ===
- June 6 - Necdet Mahfi Ayral, stage and cinema actor and director (b. 1908)
- June 13 - Doğan Acarbay, Olympic sprinter (b. 1927)
- June 15 - Ahmet Piriştina, politician (b. 1952)

=== July ===
- July 14 - İsmail Hakkı Sunat, actor (b. 1966)
- July 20 - Kamuran Gürün, diplomat (b. 1924)
- July 26
  - Oğuz Aral, cartoonist and comics artist (b. 1936)
  - Kamran Usluer, actor (b. 1937)

=== August ===
- August 15 - Semiha Berksoy, opera singer and painter (b. 1910)

=== September ===
- September 23 – Bülent Oran screenwriter and actor (b. 1924)
- September 27 – Necdet Uğur politician (b. 1923)

=== October ===
- October 7 – İsmet Ay, actor (b. 1924)
- October 18 – Pakize Tarzi, first female gynecologist in the Republic of Turkey (b. 1910)
- October 29 – Ordal Demokan, physicist (b. 1946)

=== November ===
- November 9 – Mehmet Sabancı, businessman (b. 1963)
- November 10 – Şeref Görkey, footballer and manager (b. 1913)

=== December ===
- December 4 – Mahmut Atalay, Olympic champion wrestler (b. 1934)
- December 30 – Rıza Maksut İşman, athlete (b. 1915)

== See also ==
- 2004 in Turkish television
