= Erdal =

- Gender: Male

Origin
- Language: Turkish
- Meaning: Youthful person (composed of er ("brave, capable man") and dal ("branch", "scion"))

Erdal is a masculine given name and surname of Turkish origin. Notable people with the name include:

== Given name ==
- Erdal Akdarı (born 1993), Turkish footballer
- Erdal Arıkan (born 1958), Turkish professor
- Erdal Barkay (1928–2005), Turkish hurdler and sprinter
- Erdal Beşikçioğlu (born 1970), Turkish actor
- Erdal Bibo (born 1977), Turkish basketball player
- Erdal Çelik (born 1988), Turkish-German footballer
- Erdal Ceylanoğlu (born 1945), Turkish Army general
- Erdal Eren (1961/62–1980), Turkish militant
- Erdal Erzincan (born 1971), Turkish folk musician, composer, and singer
- Erdal Gezik, Turkish writer
- Erdal Güneş (born 1982), Turkish football coach and player
- Erdal İnci (born 1983), Turkish new media artist, painter, photographer, filmmaker, and graffiti artist
- Erdal İnönü (1926–2007), Turkish theoretical physicist and politician
- Erdal Karamercan (born 1950), Turkish businessman
- Erdal Keser (born 1961), Turkish footballer
- Erdal Kılıçaslan (born 1984), Turkish-German footballer
- Erdal Kızılçay (born 1950), Turkish musician
- Erdal Merdan (1949–2010), Turkish-German dramatist, actor, and stage director
- Erdal Öztürk (born 1996), Turkish-German footballer
- Erdal Özyağcılar (born 1948), Turkish actor
- Erdal Pekdemir (born 1992), Turkish footballer
- Erdal Rakip (born 1996), Swedish footballer
- Erdal Saygın (1931–2007), Turkish educator and university administrator
- Erdal Sunar (born 1982), Turkish weightlifter
- Erdal Tosun (1963–2016), Turkish actor

== Surname ==
- Bahoz Erdal (born 1969), Syrian militant
- Eldrid Erdal (1901–1997), Norwegian politician
- Fehriye Erdal (born 1977), Turkish militant
- Jennie Erdal (1951–2020), Scottish writer
- Jorun Erdal (born 1963), Norwegian singer and musical theatre artist
- Leiv Erdal (1915–2009), Norwegian military officer, bailiff, and politician
- Marcel Erdal (born 1945), Turkish-German linguist and Turkologist
- Paul Erdal (1902–1985), Norwegian boxer
- Yasin Erdal (born 1986), Turkish-Dutch futsal player
- Ziya Erdal (born 1988), Turkish footballer

== Other uses ==
- Erdal, Vestland, a village in Askøy municipality in Vestland county, Norway
- Erdal IL, a sports club in Askøy, Norway
