= 2007 in Turkey =

- Centuries: 20th; 21st
- Decades: 1980s; 1990s; 2000s; 2010s; 2020s
- See also: List of years in Turkey

Events in the year 2007 in Turkey.

== Incumbents ==
- Ahmet Necdet Sezer, President, 2000–2007
- Abdullah Gül, President, 2007–2014
- Recep Tayyip Erdoğan, Prime Minister, 2003–2014

== Deaths ==
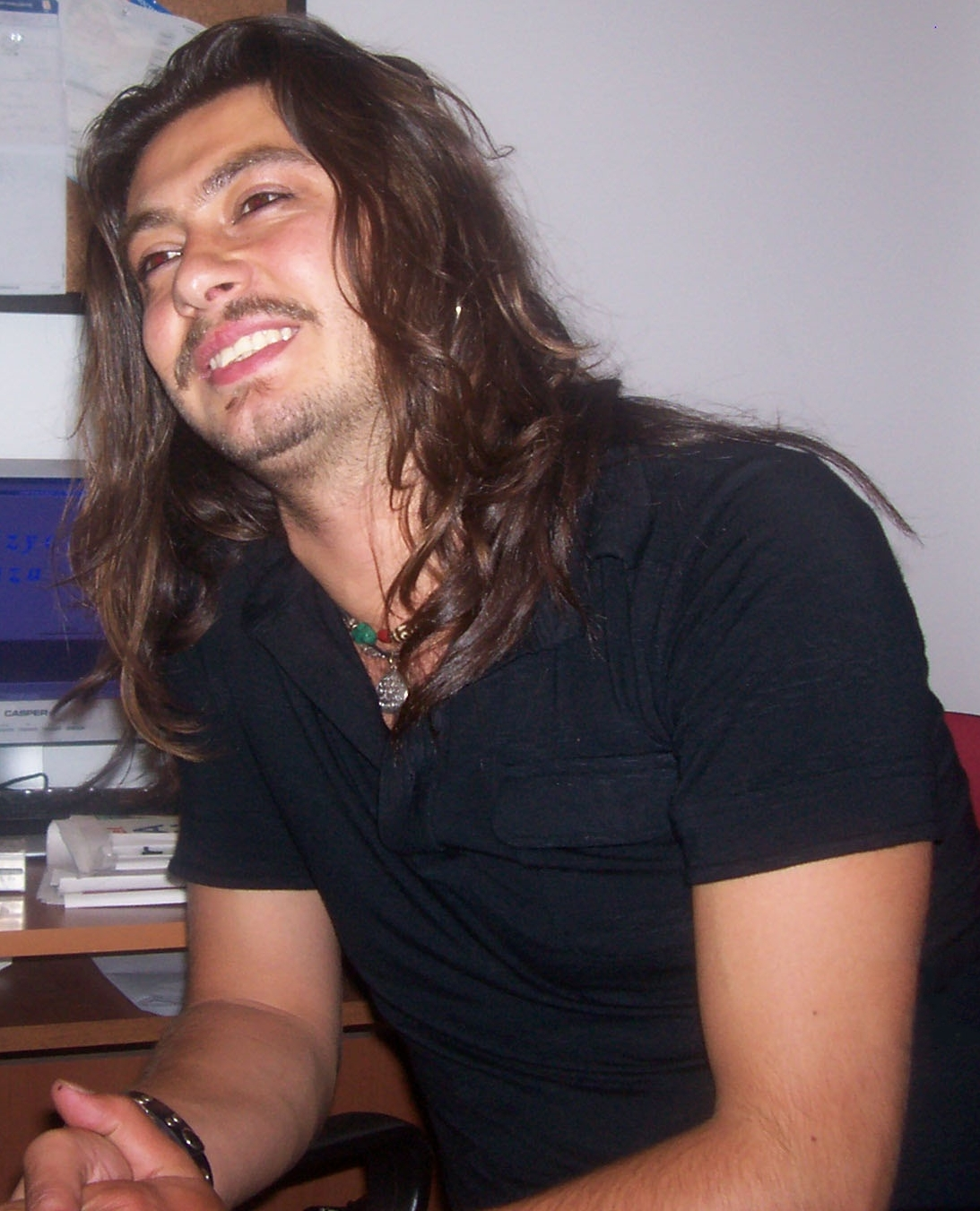
Barış Akarsu

=== January ===
- January 15 - Lale Oraloglu, actress and screenwriter (b. 1924)
- January 19 - Hrant Dink, intellectual, journalist and columnist (b. 1954)
- January 24 - İsmail Cem, politician, intellectual and journalist (b. 1940)

=== February ===
- February 20 - Zahrad, poet (b. 1924)

=== March ===
- March 3 - Türkan Rado, professor of law (b. 1915)
- March 6 - Naci Özkaya, footballer (b. 1922)

=== April ===
- April 18 - Ali Dinçer, engineer and politician (b. 1945)
- April 26 - Ümit Haluk Bayülken, diplomat, ambassador and politician (b. 1921)

=== May ===
- May 6 - Nükhet Ruacan, singer (b. 1951)
- May 26 - Hasan Eren, Turkologist and Hungarologist (b. 1919)

=== June ===
- June 23 - Erdal Saygın, academician (b. 1931)
- June 28 - Zehra Bilir, folk singer (b. 1913)

=== July ===
- July 4 - Barış Akarsu, rock musician (b. 1979)
- July 11 - Ferhunde Erkin, pianist (b. 1909)
- July 12 - Ulus Baker, sociologist (b. 1960)

=== September ===
- September 29 – Yıldırım Aktuna, psychiatrist and politician (b. 1930)

=== October ===
- October 2 – İclal Ar, soprano (b. 1904)
- October 31 – Erdal İnönü, physicist and politician (b. 1926)

=== November ===
- November 30
  - Aydın Gün, opera singer and stage director (b. 1917)
  - Engin Arık, physicist (b. 1948)

=== December ===
- December 5 – Tankut Öktem, sculptor (born 1941)
- December 10 – Vitali Hakko businessman (born 1913)
- December 12 – Saadet İkesus Altan opera singer (born 1916)
- 13 December – Ahmet Tahtakılıç, lawyer and politician (born 1909)
- December 20 – Savaş Dinçel actor (born 1942)
