= İclal =

İclal is a girl's name meaning "glory", "greatness", "respect", and "honor".

== People ==
- İclal Ar, Turkish soprano
- İclal Aydın, Turkish actress
- İclal Ersin, Turkish economist
- İclal Karaman, Turkish curler

== See also ==
- İclaliye (disambiguation)
