= Governor of Sakarya =

Governor of a Turkish Province

Governor of Sakarya Sakarya Valiliği
- Logo of the Governor of Sakarya
- Incumbent; Rahmi Doğan since September 25, 2024
- Appointer: President of Turkey; On the recommendation of the Turkish government
- Term length: No set term length or limit
- Inaugural holder: Mehmet Nazım Üner; 1954
- Website: Office of the Governor

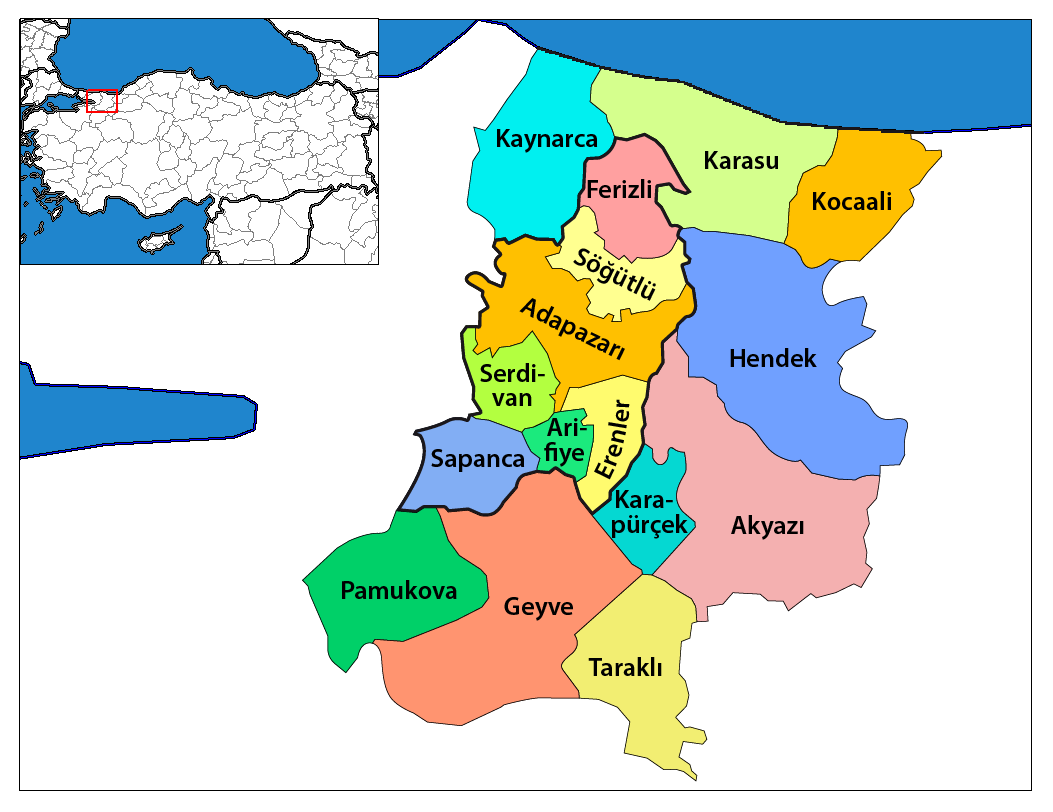
Map of the Province of Sakarya, showing the provincial districts.

The Governor of Sakarya (Turkish: Sakarya Valiliği) is the bureaucratic state official responsible for both national government and state affairs in the Province of Sakarya. Similar to the Governors of the 80 other Provinces of Turkey, the Governor of Sakarya is appointed by the Government of Turkey and is responsible for the implementation of government legislation within Sakarya. The Governor is also the most senior commander of both the Sakarya provincial police force and the Sakarya Gendarmerie.

== Appointment ==
The Governor of Sakarya is appointed by the President of Turkey, who confirms the appointment after recommendation from the Turkish Government. The Ministry of the Interior first considers and puts forward possible candidates for approval by the cabinet. The Governor of Sakarya is therefore not a directly elected position and instead functions as the most senior civil servant in the Province of Sakarya.

=== Term limits ===
The Governor is not limited by any term limits and does not serve for a set length of time. Instead, the Governor serves at the pleasure of the Government, which can appoint or reposition the Governor whenever it sees fit. Such decisions are again made by the cabinet of Turkey. The Governor of Sakarya, as a civil servant, may not have any close connections or prior experience in Sakarya Province. It is not unusual for Governors to alternate between several different Provinces during their bureaucratic career.

== Functions ==
The Governor of Sakarya has both bureaucratic functions and influence over local government. The main role of the Governor is to oversee the implementation of decisions by government ministries, constitutional requirements and legislation passed by Grand National Assembly within the provincial borders. The Governor also has the power to reassign, remove or appoint officials a certain number of public offices and has the right to alter the role of certain public institutions if they see fit. Governors are also the most senior public official within the Province, meaning that they preside over any public ceremonies or provincial celebrations being held due to a national holiday. As the commander of the provincial police and Gendarmerie forces, the Governor can also take decisions designed to limit civil disobedience and preserve public order. Although mayors of municipalities and councillors are elected during local elections, the Governor has the right to re-organise or to inspect the proceedings of local government despite being an unelected position.

== List of governors of Sakarya ==
- Nazım Üner (1954–1956)
- Gafur Soylu (1956–1957)
- Reşat Akşemsettinoğlu (1957–1960)
- Fethi Tansuk (1960)
- İzzet Ertunç (1960–1962)
- Cezmi Kartay (1962–1964)
- Ahmet Vefik Kitapçıgil (1964–1967)
- Ferit Nomer (1967–1968)
- Mustafa Yörükoğlu (1968–1971)
- Müfit Bayraktar (1971–1975)
- Hayri Kozakçıoğlu (1975–1978)
- Naci Gürcan (1978–1979)
- Kamil Demircioğlu (1979–1980)
- Necati Develioğlu (1980–1981)
- Arif Atilla Osmançelebioğlu (1981–1984)
- İbrahim Ural (1984–1988)
- Bahaeddin Güney (1988–1991)
- Erhan Tanju (1991–1992)
- Saffet Arıkan Bedük (1992–1993)
- Kutlu Aktaş (1993–1995)
- Yener Rakıcıoğlu (1995–1999)
- Mustafa Cahit Kıraç (1999–2004)
- Nuri Okutan (2004–2007)
- Hüseyin Atak (2007–2009)
- Mustafa Büyük (2010–2014)
- Hüseyin Avni Coş (2014–2017)
- İrfan Balkanlıoğlu (2017–2018)
- Ahmet Hamdi Nayir (2018–2020)
- Çetin Oktay Kaldırım (2020–2023)
- Yaşar Karadeniz (2023–2024)
- Rahmi Doğan (2024–)

== See also ==
- Governor (Turkey)
- Sakarya Province
- Ministry of the Interior (Turkey)
