= 2010 in Turkey =

- Centuries: 20th; 21st
- Decades: 1990s; 2000s; 2010s; 2020s; 2030s
- See also: List of years in Turkey

Events in the year 2010 in Turkey.

== Incumbents ==
- Abdullah Gül, President, 2007–2014
- Recep Tayyip Erdoğan, Prime Minister, 2003–2014

== Events ==
- 20 January – The Balyoz Harekâtı ("Sledgehammer") alleged coup plot is revealed triggering a major investigation and the arrest of dozens of senior military officers in February.
- 8 March – The 6.1 M_{w} Elazığ earthquake shook eastern Turkey with a maximum Mercalli intensity of VI (Strong). 42 people were killed.
- 28 August – 2010 FIBA World Championship
- 12 November – The Turkish constitutional referendum was held. It passed with about 58% in favor of the changes and about 42% against them. It was aimed to bring the constitution into compliance with EU standards.
- 2 December – Women's World Chess Championship 2010

== Deaths ==
- 18 June – Okan Demiriş.
- Leyla Gamsiz Sarptürk.

== See also ==
- List of Turkish films of 2010
