= Forests of Turkey =

Turkish woodlands and maquis

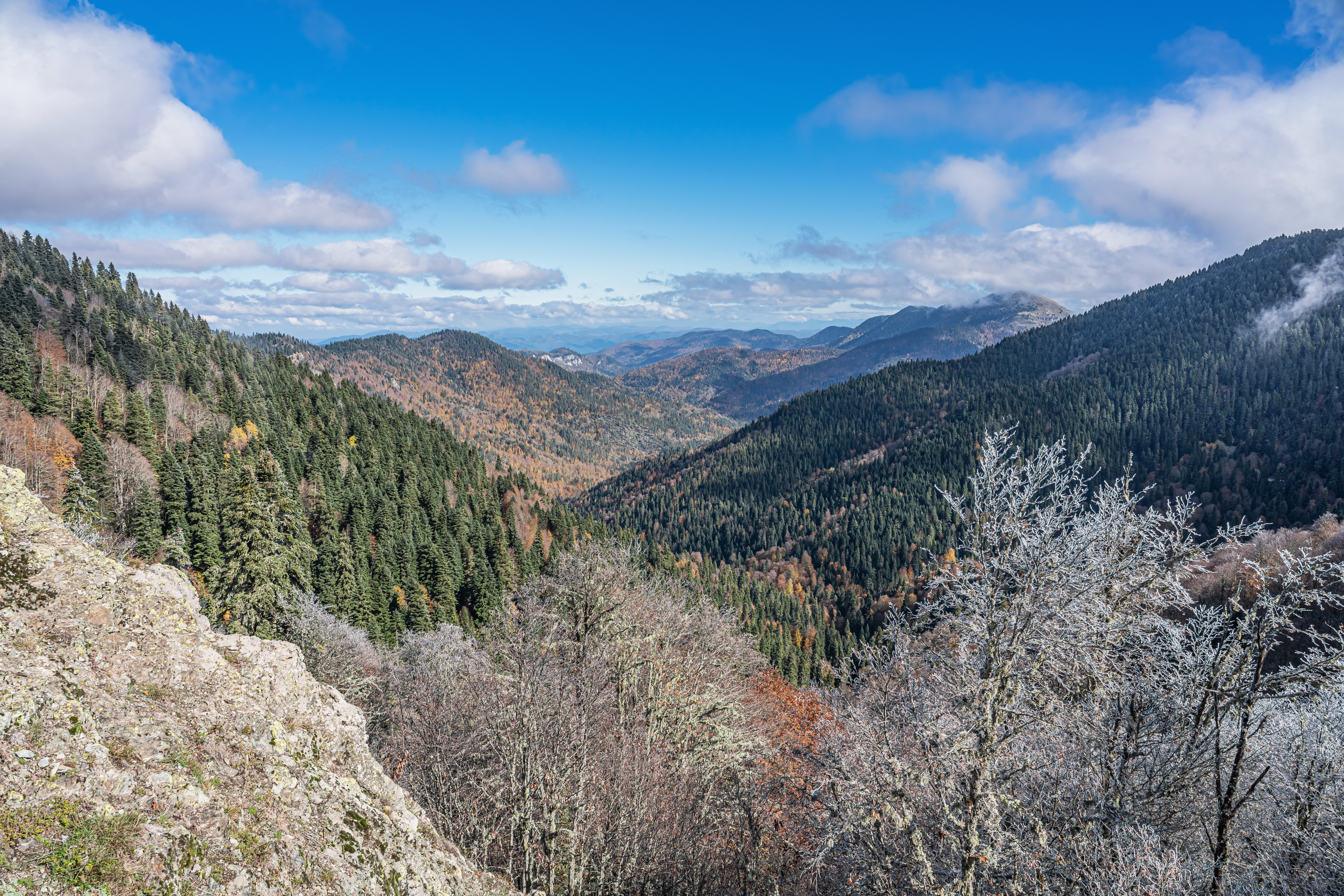
Autumn in Yedigöller National Park

Forests cover almost a third of Turkey. They are almost all state-owned, and vary from temperate rainforest in the north-east to maquis in the south and west. Pine, fir, oak and beech are common.

After the glaciers retreated over ten thousand years ago, woods grew to cover most of the land which is now Turkey; however over thousands of years, many of the trees have been cut down. The country is slowly reforesting, which is beneficial for its wildlife and to absorb carbon to help limit climate change.

As of the mid-2020s, the main product of Turkey's forests is wood, and they are also important for recreation. Almost half the forest is badly degraded, and the woodlands are threatened by drought, wildfire, mining, and pests and diseases.

== Definition and cover ==
In 2023, forests covered about 30% of the country, almost the global average. Legally in Turkey, a piece of woodland of less than three hectares (ha) cannot be labelled "forest". However, the national greenhouse gas inventory uses the Food and Agriculture Organization definition: forests must cover 1 ha or more and be at least 5m high. There are forest–subcategories of coniferous, deciduous, mixed, and 'other forested land' which has a crown closure between 1 and 10 percent. Forests with a crown closure of over 10% are classed as productive. Trees grown for crops in plantations (such as Turkey's hazelnuts) are not classified as forests. A 2024 study states that deforestation caused by other uses of forest land, such as mining, is not reflected in official statistics, (Note: Forested land may be leased for up to 49 years for permitted uses, but in theory would return to forest, and so is still officially forest land.) and that these uses cause forest degradation by fragmentation. As of 2024, over 40% of the forests in Turkey were heavily degraded, that is with less than 10% canopy cover. In 2024 preparations for a new inventory continued, and the Turkish National Forestry Program (2024–2043) is being prepared. Since a change to the Forestry Law in 2018, the president has been able to reclassify land as not being forest.

== History ==
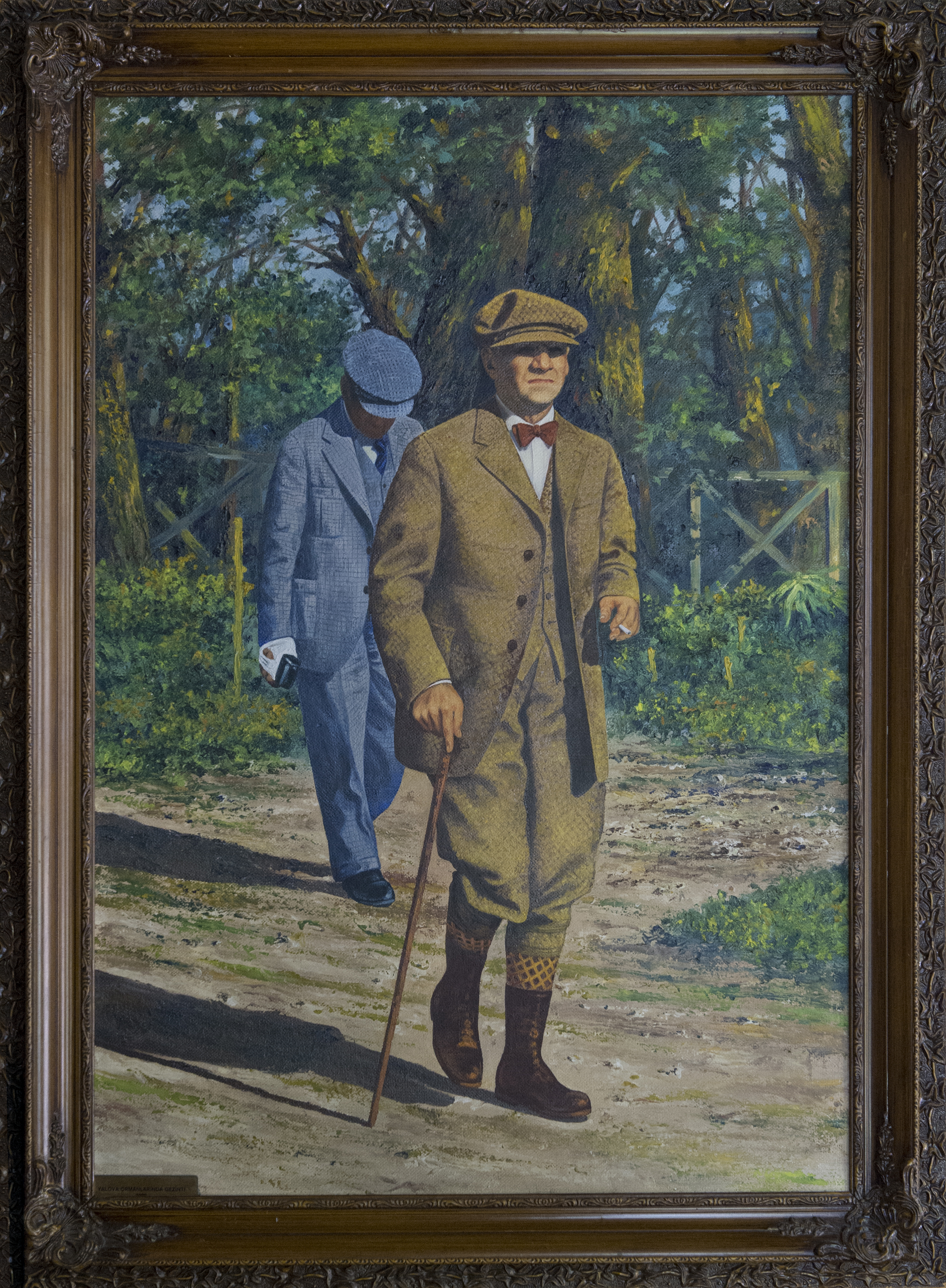
Painting in Bursa Forestry Museum showing Atatürk in woods

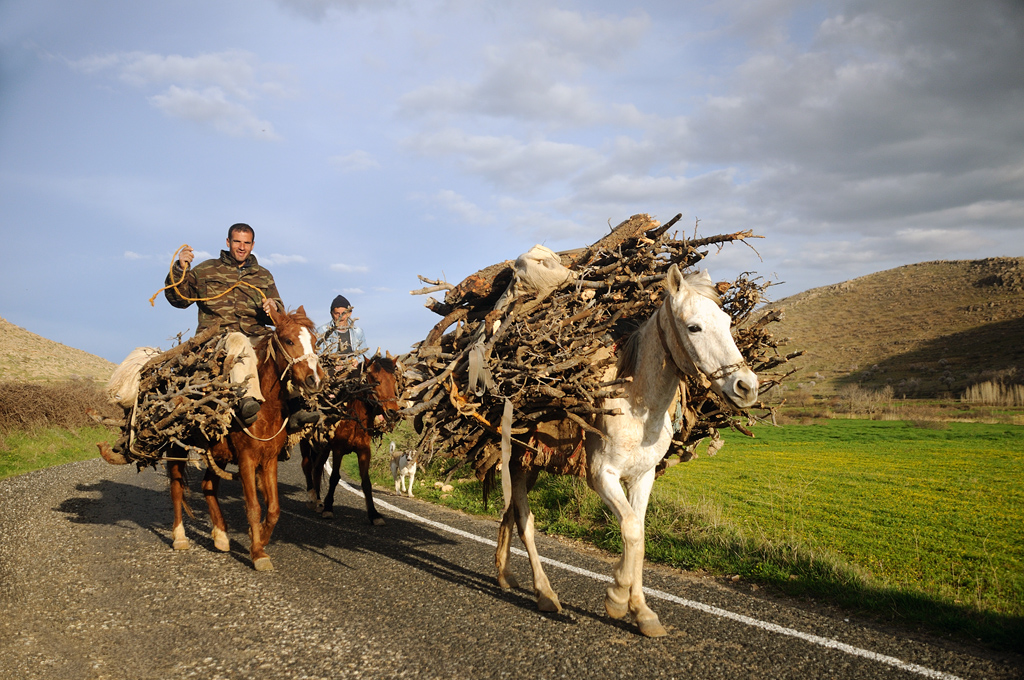
Transporting firewood in the early 21st century

As Turkeyʼs glaciers almost all melted over ten thousand years ago, more oak (both deciduous, such as Turkey oak, and evergreen oak) grew in Central Anatolia. Ten thousand years ago, Anatolia was mostly forested, but forest cover before the formation of the Republic of Turkey in 1923 is not well documented. That period and prehistory can, however, be studied from tree rings, palynology (ancient particles such as pollen) and charcoal.

Deforestation had increased sharply by 4000 BC, when wood was used for fuel and construction, for example in the settlement of Çatalhöyük. In the Bronze Age, at around 3500 BC, humans began to significantly impact forests, for example by transporting wood from remote areas. In the last two thousand years, especially in the last five hundred, much old growth forest has been cut down. Wooden ships were built, sometimes armies at war burnt forests to expose their enemies, and forests were cleared for agriculture. As well as oak, there were juniper and Black pine (Pinus nigra) in these forests. Turkish sweetgum (Liquidambar orientalis) was formerly widespread, but is now restricted to Southwest Anatolia. Sources such as Theophrastus show that Ancient Mediterranean civilisations used wood as a fuel in houses, bakeries, bathhouses, and for metalwork. Cedar was used for temples, such as at Ephesus and Artemis. Chestnut and fir were used for charcoal. The Ottoman navy built ships from timber from the coasts of the Black, Marmara and Aegean Seas. Typically, armies used more wood than navies.

As part of late Ottoman Empire reforms, a Forest Charter was issued in 1840 and the Forestry Directorate established, but according to one study it was too top-down and lacked public engagement. After the formation of the republic in the 1920s, forestry and wood production were increased. Forests were nationalised in 1938, and the first large afforestation project in Turkey was done in 1939.

== Climate and forests ==
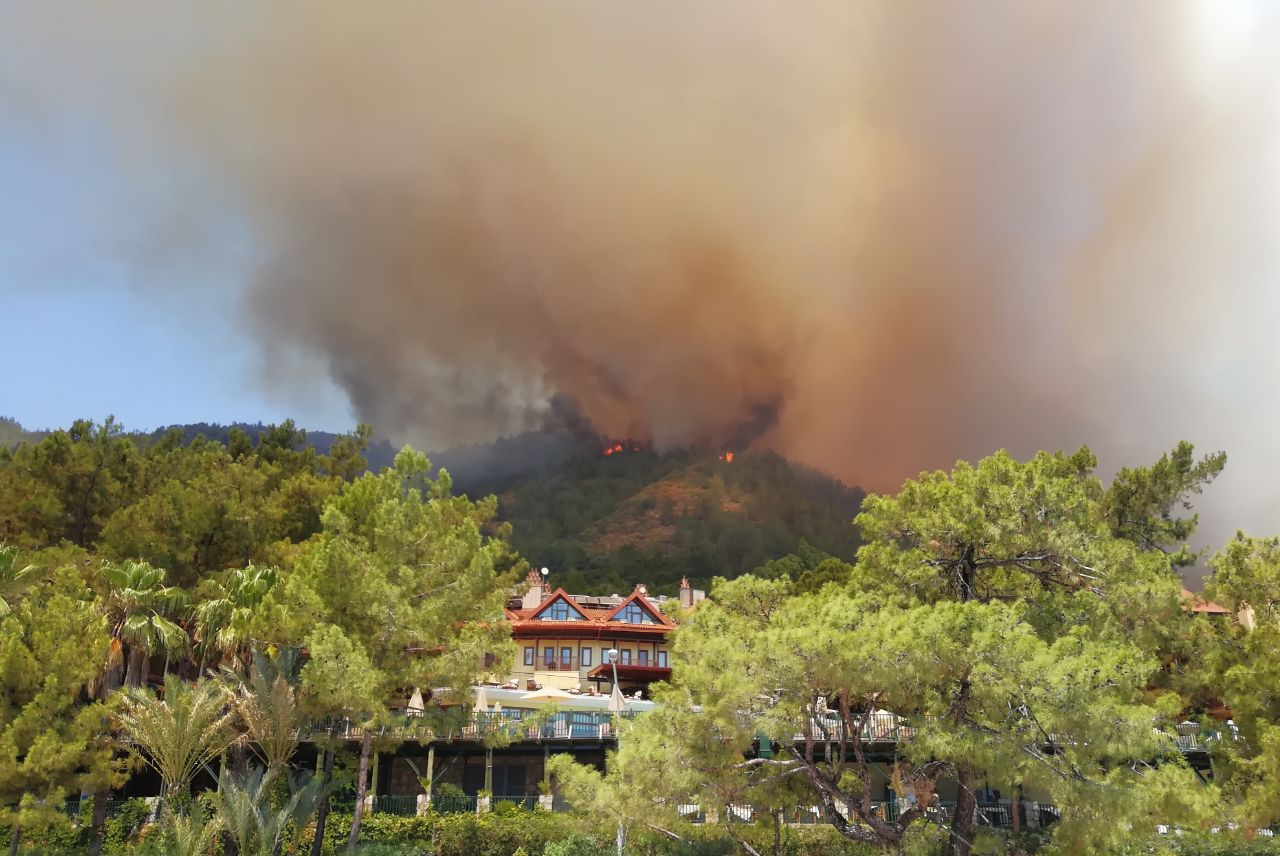
Marmaris forest fire in 2021

Burning coal, petrol, diesel and natural gas is putting far more carbon dioxide into the air than forests can take out.

Although forests cover 23 million (almost 30%) of Turkey's 78 million ha, 3 million ha have less than 10% crown cover, and almost 10 million ha were degraded forest as of 2020. Almost all forests are state owned and managed by the General Directorate of Forestry (GDF) of the Ministry of Agriculture and Forestry; the GDF plan to increase the amount of forests so as to remove more carbon from the atmosphere, and thus reabsorb more of Turkey's greenhouse gas emissions. The GDF has 28 Regional Directorates of Forestry and 12 Forestry Research Institutes. The Turkish constitution prohibits existing forests being transferred from state ownership, but state land is sometimes leased for private reforestation. Reforestation by the private sector varies around five thousand ha a year. A 2020 study suggested that incentives for private afforestation should be increased. There is a strategic plan for adaptation to climate change, and Turkey is taking part in the Bonn Challenge. The Turkish Industry and Business Association (TÜSİAD) recommends that afforestation should be better planned, carbon offsets and credits should be available, and carbon storage should be included in the Forest Law.

Snow, and to a lesser extent rain, has decreased in Turkey. TÜSİAD predicts a 90% reduction in habitats suitable for Black pine. TÜSİAD reports that the massive forest fires that burned in 2021 and the shrinkage and drying of wetlands in Central Anatolia are the most obvious examples of aridification. The severity of drought and the area affected will increase with the effects of climate change; it is predicted that this will harm forests. In a climate that becomes more arid, efforts to increase carbon sink areas, such as afforestation and carbon sequestration, will become less efficient. Drought is a threat both directly and indirectly by encouraging bark beetles.

== Distribution of forests ==
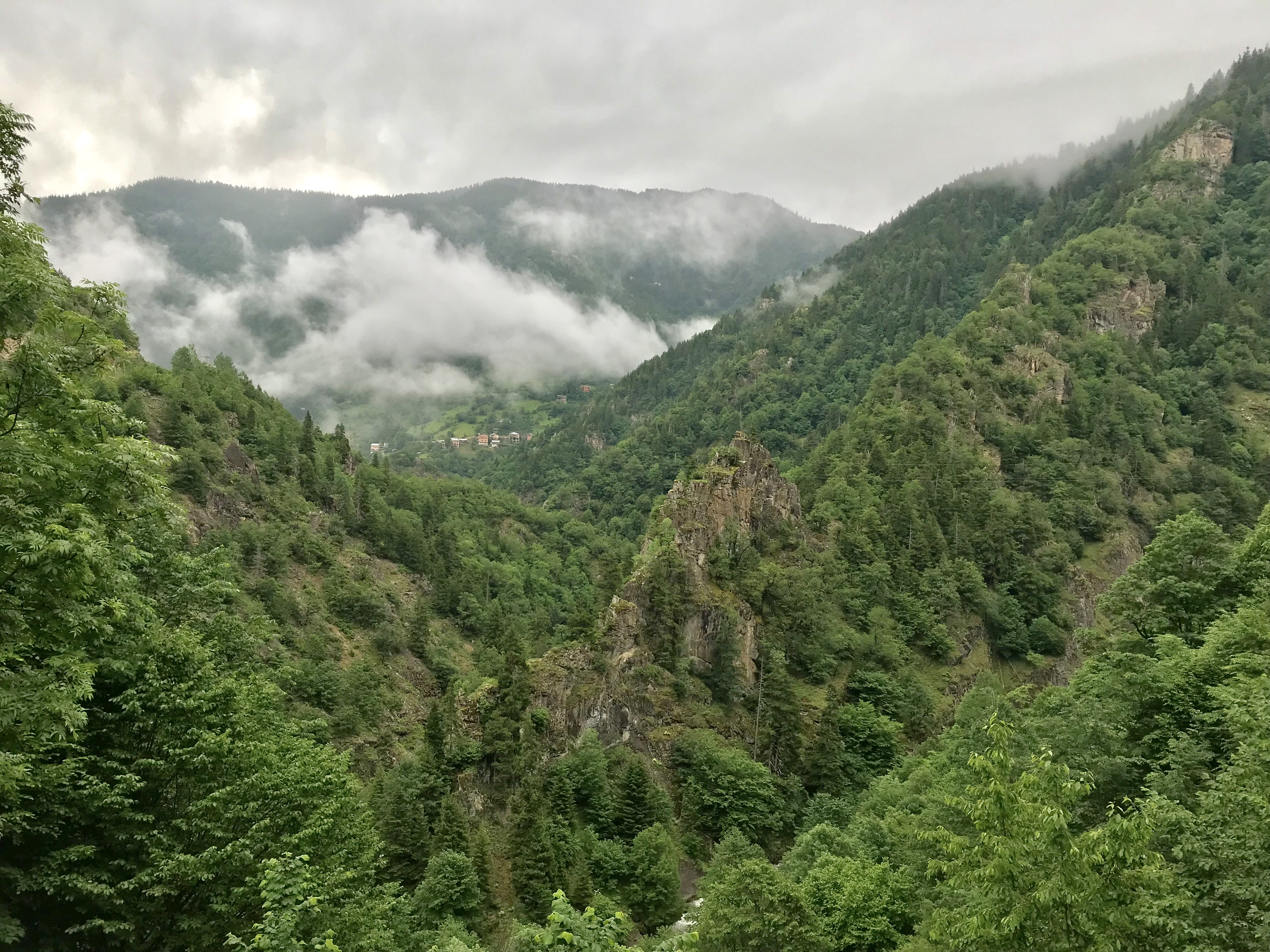
Giresun Province in the Black Sea Region, Turkey's most forested region

Forests are mainly on the mountain ranges parallel to the Mediterranean and Black Sea coasts. 4% of forests are coppice while the rest are high forests, and there are six million ha of maquis, mostly in the south and west. High rainfall in the eastern Black Sea Region sustains temperate rainforest. 15% of forest area is in protected areas and the rest in managed forest.

Eight ecoregions are officially defined, all of which contain woodland: Euxine-Colchic deciduous forest; North Anatolian deciduous, coniferous and mixed; Mediterranean coastal zone deciduous and coniferous; Mediterranean Mountain zone; Aegean Inland deciduous and coniferous; Central Anatolian steppe; East Anatolian deciduous; and East Anatolian steppe. Others include Balkan mixed forests and Caucasus mixed forests, and the World Wide Fund for Nature lists 13 ecozones with woodland. Almost all the forests are in a temperate climate.

A quarter of the Black Sea Region is forested, while other regions with over 10% forest include Marmara, Aegean, Mediterranean and East Anatolia. Wildfires are increasing in some regions due to climate change in Turkey. Because of droughts in 2008, 2020, and 2021, more forests burned in those years.

Large areas of forest can be inventoried by satellite to hectare scale, and small areas by lidar. The national database, known as EVANIS, uses the national legal definition of forest and is very accurate for stands, but not as good at estimating how much carbon dioxide is absorbed by land use, land-use change, and forestry.

The 2023 GDF activity report says "In addition, with the aim of planning and implementing forest areas in an organized and sustainable manner under the name of "Nation Forest" with a new recreation approach, Amasya National Forest, Izmir National Forest, Kastamonu National Forest, Kayseri National Forest, Mersin National Forest, Kocaeli National Forest, Batman National Forest. Forest, Manisa National Forest and Siirt National Forest facilities were realized."

== City forests and urban trees ==
In the early 21st century the government put more emphasis on urban trees and has said that each major city should have a "city forest", however these are not always controlled by city councils.

== Ecology ==
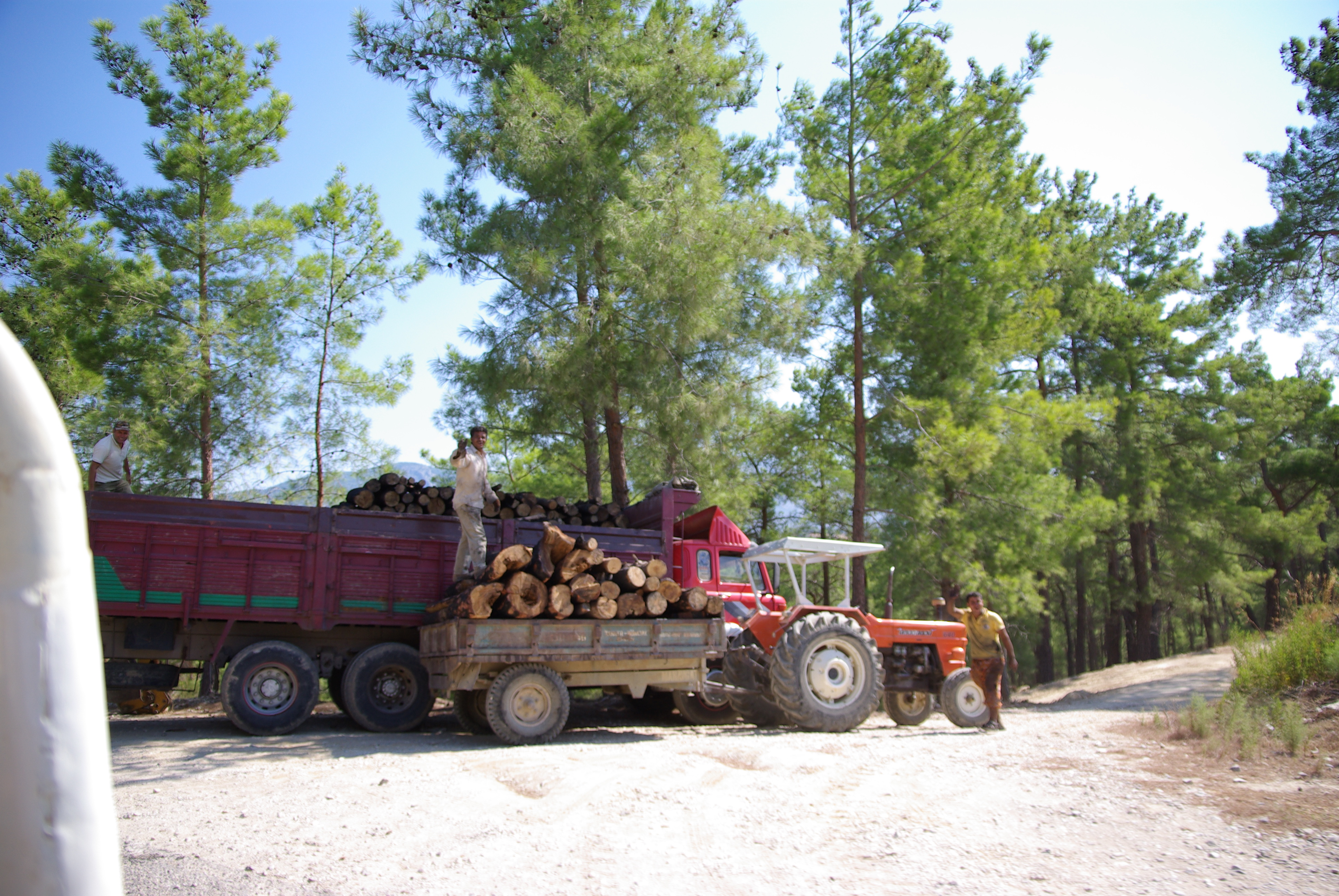
Turkish pine forestry in the Taurus Mountains

Over half the volume of forest in Turkey is from the three species of Turkish pine, Black pine and Scots pine. Brown bears sometimes leave the forest and enter urban areas - there is a fine for shooting them.

Most forests are natural and semi-natural, with some being on mountains and having a lot of biodiversity, hosting most species of the flora and fauna of Turkey, including flagship species such as Anatolian leopards. Deciduous forests can be found along the Black Sea. Species in various ecoregions in Turkey, namely Irano-Turanion, Mediterranean and Euro-Siberian, belong to about 800 woody taxa. As of 2020 the predominant species are oak (Quercus spp. 29%), Turkish pine (Pinus brutia 23%), black pine (Pinus nigra 18%), Oriental beech (Fagus orientalis 8%), European red pine (Pinus silvestris 6%), Juniper (Juniperus spp. 6%), Fir (Abies spp. 2%), Caucasian Spruce (Picea orientalis 2%), Cedar of Lebanon (Cedrus libani 2%): other species include stone pine (Pinus pinea), Mediterranean cypress (Cupressus sempervirens), Aleppo pine (Pinus halepensis), Alder (Alnus spp.), sweet chestnut (Castanea sativa), and hornbeam (Carpinus betulus).

=== Old-growth forest ===
There are old-growth forests containing over 500 taxa of trees and shrubs in the country. Old-growth-forests are defined as "A primary or natural/near natural forest area containing tree species, whose existence can be traced back from hundreds of years to neolithic ages." Degraded ancient woodlands are sometimes very scattered. According to a 2018 study by Turkish and British academics, both local support and national policy are needed to protect and rehabilitate them. Heritage trees include the İnkaya Plane Tree, and some are called natural monuments.

== Benefits of forests ==
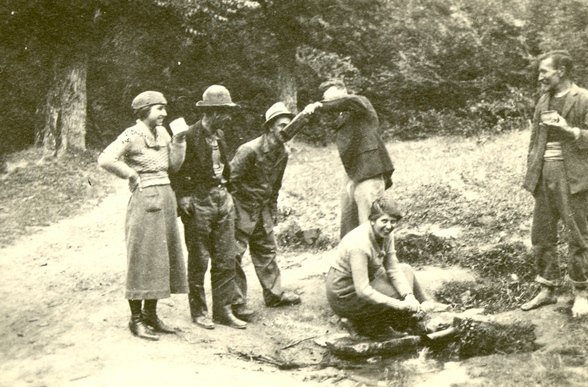
Foreigners visiting Belgrad Forest in Istanbul in the 1920s

Picnic sites are often wooded

Forests are the country's main carbon sink, especially in western Turkey where most are living biomass rather than soil organic carbon. Forests are estimated to have absorbed 34 million tonnes of the 600 million tonnes of greenhouse gas emissions by Turkey in 2021, less than in previous years due to both forest fires and a lot of wood being harvested. The World Bank says that, "Increasing forest cover and improving forest health can help prevent soil erosion and landslides and reduce the impacts of floods." In the mid-2020s the World Bank is supporting a project to make the forests more resilient against climate change in Turkey. Eight million ha of forests are certified by the Forest Stewardship Council.

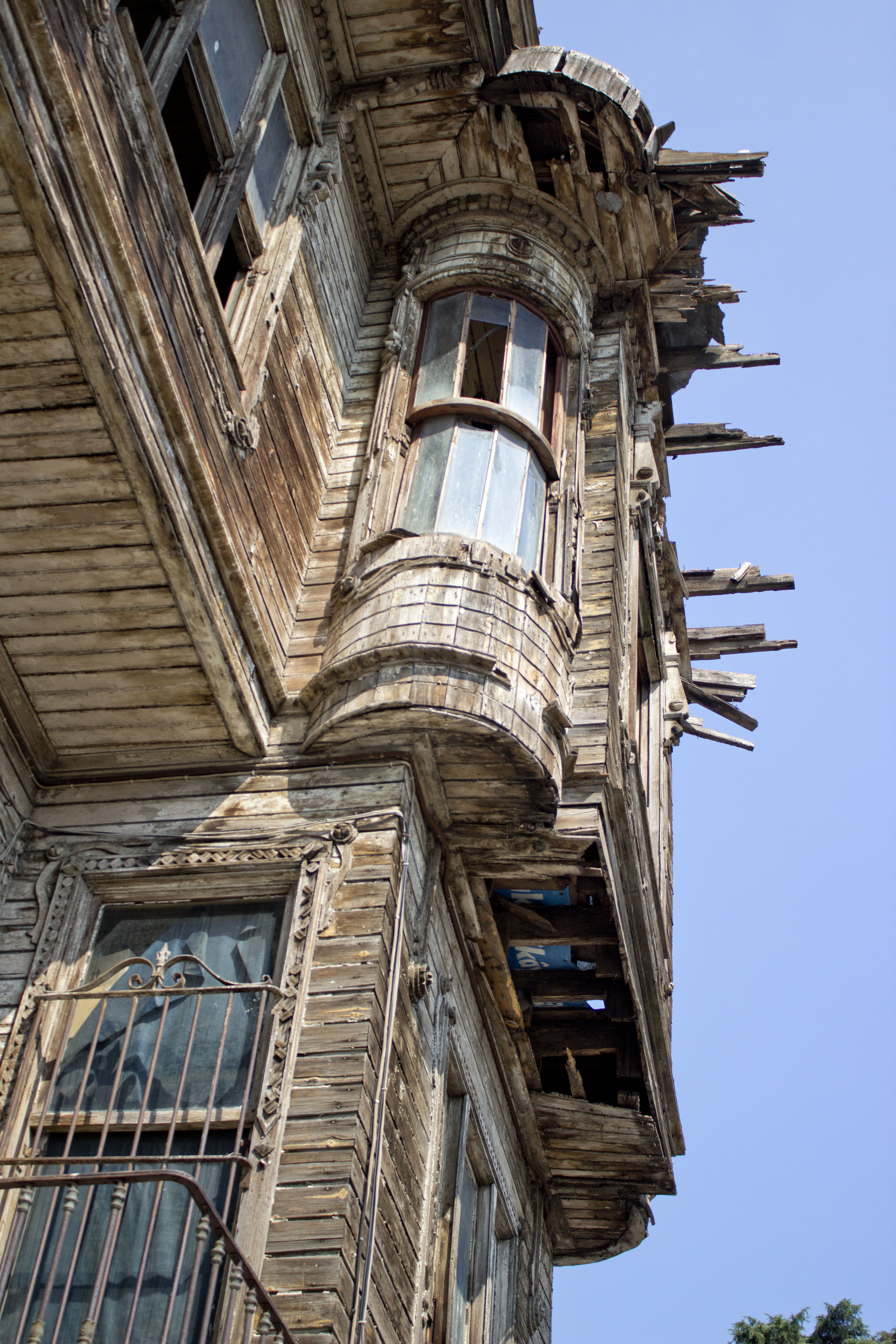
Detail of an old house in Çengelköy in Istanbul

Some forests, such as Belgrad Forest in Istanbul, are important for recreation and tourism. Some national parks and nature parks of Turkey contain forest, and there is an ecotourism plan to 2025. There are forest schools and preschooling.

As of the early 2020s, there is no regulation encouraging more use of wood in buildings instead of concrete and steel, which are carbon-intensive. There is no standard life-cycle assessment of the sustainability of buildings. There are no plans to reduce firewood burning, although it emits soot and causes indoor air pollution, which is bad for health.

=== Forest products ===
About half of forest in Turkey is directly part of the economy, with most of the rest functioning as watershed and erosion control. 29 million m^{3} of standing trees, (Note: dikili damga has been mistranslated as "sewn stamp" [sic] but perhaps means timber mark.) 23 million m^{3} industrial wood, and five million steres of firewood were sold in 2023. As of 2023, wood production is the main source of profit from forests. 25 million m^{3} of wood was harvested in 2022, including 9 million m^{3} of timber, 9 million m^{3} of fibre-chip wood, 5 million m^{3} of paper wood, and 1 million m^{3} of industry wood. Most wood is used to make board. Lidar can estimate wood volume.

70% of timber is used in construction, 20% is used in furniture and 10% is used in packaging and other industries. Timber consumption per person per year is about 0.08 m^{3}. Feebates for landowners have been suggested, especially for land at the agriculture/forest boundary: [CO_{2} rental price] × [carbon storage on their land in a baseline period ─ stored carbon in the current period].

Non-timber forest products include resin, acorns, mushrooms, truffles, and honey. Boar hunting (sometimes in fields rather than forest), deer hunting, and hunting of some other species is regulated by the ministry.

The value of wood product exports is more than twice that of imports, and the value of both exports and imports increased from 2020 to 2022. In 2022, the country from which the most wood products were imported from was Russia (over 20%) and that to which the most was exported was Iraq (about 10%).

== Threats ==
Some non-native insects, such as scale insects (Hemiptera: Coccomorpha), are pests. Wildfires in Turkey, such as in 2021, affect the economy in various sectors, such as tourism. The public may be banned from entering forests in the summer in efforts to prevent fires. The 2021 mega fires are estimated to have emitted 10 million tonnes of carbon dioxide from 135 million ha burnt. The World Bank is helping to increase resilience to wildfires. The Turkish Foundation for Combating Soil Erosion said that from 2012 to 2022, too many licenses were being granted for non-forest uses, such as mining. However, in 2024, the extension of coal mining in Akbelen Forest was eventually refused after protests, and a 2020 study said that 2010s legislation had made mining in forests more sustainable. Satellites such as Landsat and Sentinel can be used to study fire damage. As of 2021, the Istanbul northern forest is threatened by urban growth.

== Regeneration and reforestation ==
Most potential for reforestation is thought to be in the north. As of 2022, how much of the Central Anatolian steppe was originally forested was not certain, but in some lower regions, it is thought that it has always been steppe and too dry for trees due to the rain shadows of nearby mountains. However a 2018 study said that temperature is more important than precipitation. It said because they are hot the Aegean and Mediterranean regions would potentially be mostly coniferous. And it said the Black Sea and Maramara regions could have broadleaf, mixed forests would be in Central Anatolia. A 2006 study suggested that 50 million ha (64%) of land was potential forest. For steppe, it has been suggested that overgrazing should be stopped, but that full recovery to woodland should be prevented so as to have both steppe and woodland wildlife.

Regeneration of ancient woodland (also called old-growth forest) may be possible, if local needs are properly considered. As some reforestation attempts have suffered due to a lack of water, desalination has been suggested. Coppices have become high forests, and grassland in and around forest has become forests. Anatolian black pine is commonly used for reforestation. The Turkish Foundation for Combating Soil Erosion is an involved NGO. The Foresters' Association of Turkey, established in 1924, is one of the country's oldest civil society organisations. It takes twenty years to convert to forest. Salt, gypsum and very alkali ground can hinder forest growth. Although companies donate some saplings, memorial forests, such as Cyprus Memorial Forest in Silifke, are not usually corporate forests. Belts and lines of trees are planted to combat wind erosion.

Turkey's 12th development plan (2024 to 2028) says that "carbon sink areas will be increased by improving the adaptation capability of our forests to climate change."

== People and culture ==
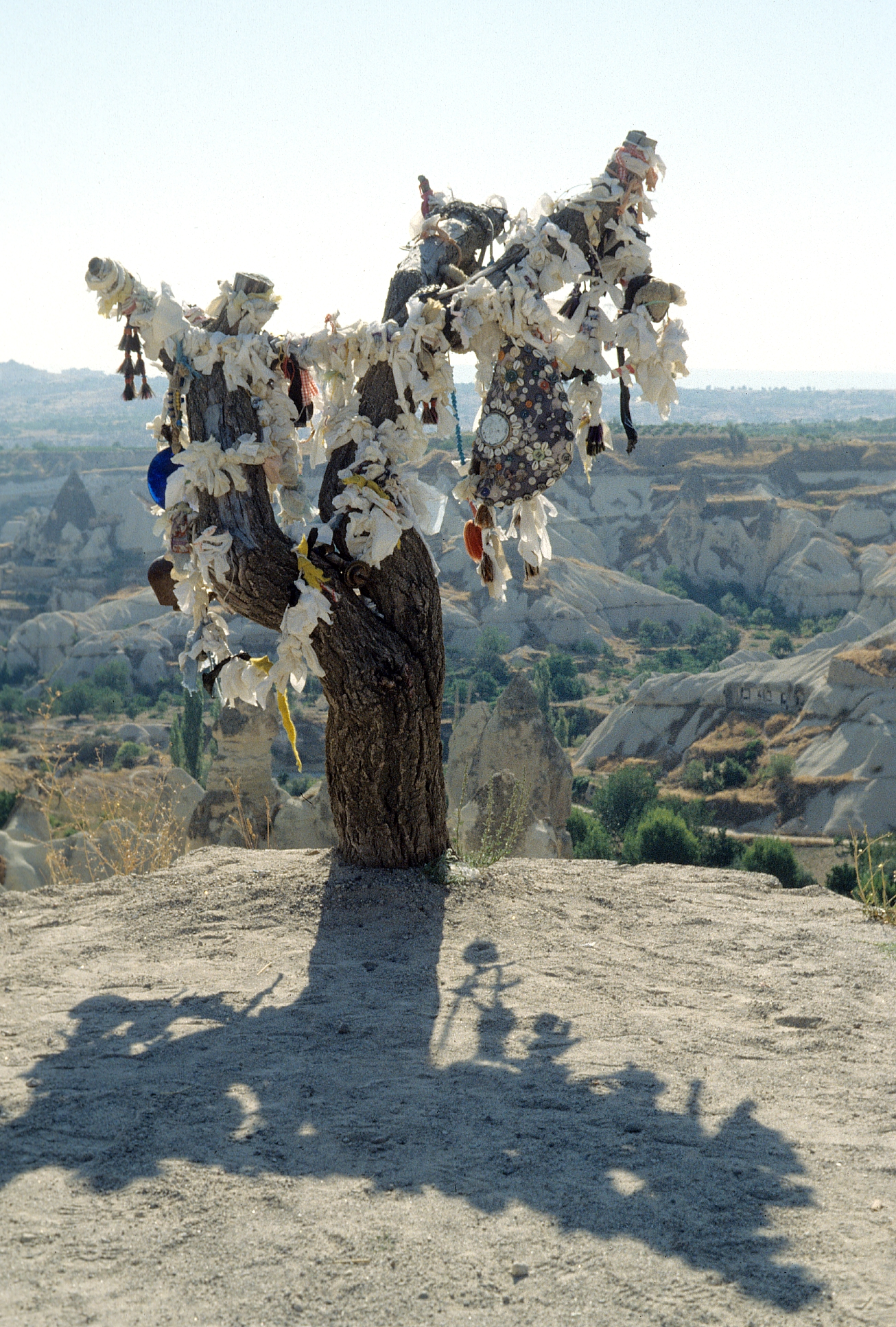
Wish tree in late 20th century Cappadocia

Trees and forest are important in Turkish culture. Turkish people include Tahtacı, who may have descended from Ağaçeri and are documented in the short documentary Fatma of the Forest. Turkic mythology may have included the tree of life Ulukayın, and forest spirits archura and äbädä.

Regulations say that the nearest "forest villagers" must do all forestry work. However, younger people are moving to towns and cities, and new equipment is expensive for the villagers. As of 2024, there are 25 thousand forest rangers. 1.2 billion lira (49,000,000 USD) support was provided to eleven thousand families in 2023.

== Tree cover loss ==
Global Forest Watch publishes annual estimates of tree cover loss and year-2000 tree cover extent derived from time-series analysis of Landsat satellite imagery in the Global Forest Change dataset. In this framework, tree cover refers to vegetation taller than 5 m (including natural forests and tree plantations), and tree cover loss is defined as the complete removal of tree cover canopy for a given year, regardless of cause.

For Turkey, country statistics for tree cover density greater than 30% report a 2000 tree cover extent of 10,060,813 ha (100,608.13 km^{2}) and cumulative tree cover loss of 772,193 ha (7,721.93 km^{2}) from 2001 to 2024. The chart and table below show annual tree cover loss only; they do not show tree cover gain or net change. A separate Global Forest Watch net-change dataset estimates that Turkey had a net increase of 89,000 ha (890 km^{2}) in tree cover from 2000 to 2020 (+0.65%). Global Forest Watch also reports that 2021 was Turkey's peak year for tree cover loss due to fires, with 27,000 ha (270 km^{2}) lost to fires, 34% of all tree cover loss in that year.

Annual tree cover loss in Turkey, 2001–2024 (loss only; does not show tree cover gain or net change). View chart definition.

Annual tree cover loss in Turkey, 2001–2024 (loss only)
Year	Annual tree cover loss (km2)
2001	229.10
2002	257.22
2003	177.44
2004	289.77
2005	204.10
2006	258.86
2007	253.44
2008	288.92
2009	281.08
2010	170.07
2011	238.89
2012	284.68
2013	225.44
2014	220.05
2015	277.35
2016	256.32
2017	339.02
2018	356.69
2019	391.19
2020	453.48
2021	792.85
2022	534.03
2023	540.43
2024	401.51
