= 2005 in Turkey =

- Centuries: 20th; 21st
- Decades: 1980s; 1990s; 2000s; 2010s; 2020s
- See also: List of years in Turkey

Events in the year 2005 in Turkey.

== Incumbents ==
- President: Ahmet Necdet Sezer
- Prime Minister: Recep Tayyip Erdoğan
- Speaker: Bülent Arınç

== Events ==
=== October ===
- October 3 – the European Union has decided to start full membership negotiations with Turkey.

== Births ==
- 25 February – Arda Güler, footballer

== Deaths ==
- 13 February – Hüdai Oral
- 24 February – Coşkun Kırca
- 7 April – Melih Kibar
- 19 April – Hâlit Ziyâ Konuralp
- 12 May – Ömer Kavur
- 26 August – Mediha Esenel
- 3 October – Nurettin Ersin

== See also ==
- List of Turkish films of 2005
