= Tomb of Karyağdı Hatun =

Türbe in Ankara, Turkey

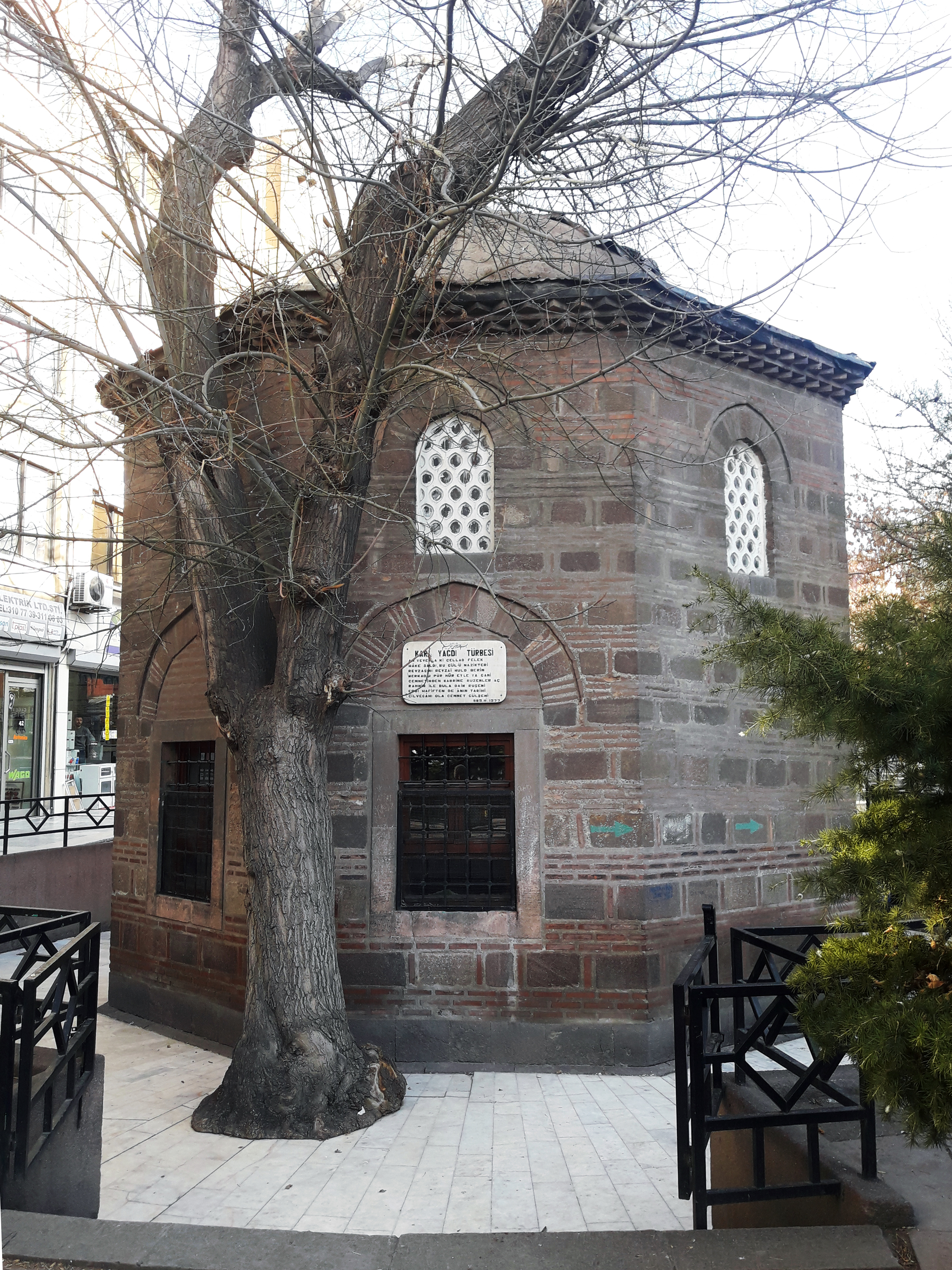
The tomb of Karyağdı Hatun from the west

The tomb of Karyağdı Hatun (Turkish: Karyağdı Hatun Türbesi) is a mausoleum in Ankara, Turkey.

== The tomb ==
It is in Altındağ secondary municipality of Ankara at 39°56′18″N 32°51′23″E. Its distance to Ulus Square is less than 500 metres (1,600 ft). According to the inscription on the gate, the mausoleum was built in 1577, during the Ottoman Empire period. There is only one coffin in the mausoleum. It is an octagonal building with lead coating roof. The walls are of cut stone. The gate faces east.

== Legend of Karyağdı Hatun ==
Nothing definite is known about Karyağdı Hatun, the eponym of mausoleum. In Turkish, Karyağdı means "snowed" and Hatun means "lady". According to the legend she was a pregnant lady. She got craving for snow during the hot summer days. One night it snowed and the lady ate the snow. But she got ill and died. In 1983 Okan Demiriş composed an opera about this legend. Its premiere was in 1985.
