= 2009 in Turkey =

- Centuries: 20th; 21st
- Decades: 1980s; 1990s; 2000s; 2010s; 2020s
- See also: List of years in Turkey

Events in the year 2009 in Turkey.

== Incumbents ==
Photo	Post	Name
	President of Turkey	Abdullah Gül
	Prime Minister of Turkey	Recep Tayyip Erdoğan

== Events ==
- 9 August – Mehmet Ali Şahin becomes Speaker of the Parliament of Turkey.
- date unknown – Yazıcı Dam goes into service.

== Arts and culture ==
=== Films ===
- See List of Turkish films of 2009

== Deaths ==
- 25 March – Muhsin Yazıcıoğlu, politician (born 1954; helicopter crash)
- 26 October – Orhan Onar, judge (born 1923
- 19 December – Zeki Ökten, film director (born 1942; heart failure)
