= Saygın =

Turkish surname

Saygın (IPA: [ˈsajgɯn]) and the related Saygun (IPA: [ˈsajgun]) are Turkish surnames and the version Saygın also a male given name with the literal meaning "reputable", "respectable" and may refer to:

== Given name ==
- Saygin Yalcin (born 1985), German entrepreneur and academic lecturer of Turkish origin

== Surname Saygın ==
- Erdal Saygın (1931–2007), Turkish educator
- Işılay Saygın (1947–2019), politician and Turkish architect

== Surname Saygun ==
- Ahmet Adnan Saygun (1907–1991), Turkish composer
- Hüseyin Saygun (1920–1993), Turkish footballer

== See also ==
- Saygı
