= 2006 in Turkey =

- Centuries: 20th; 21st
- Decades: 1980s; 1990s; 2000s; 2010s; 2020s
- See also: List of years in Turkey

The following lists events that happened in 2006 in Turkey.

== Incumbents ==
- President: Ahmet Necdet Sezer
- Prime Minister: Recep Tayyip Erdoğan
- Speaker: Bülent Arınç

== Events ==
=== January ===
- January 4 – Turkey announces two confirmed human cases of the avian influenza.
- January 6 – A third child from the same family in eastern Turkey dies of H5N1 avian influenza. Hülya Koçyiğit, 11, was the sister of Mehmet Ali, 14, who died last weekend, and of Fatma, 15, who died on Thursday. She was the third human fatality outside China and South-East Asia. A six-year-old brother is also being treated for the same disease.
- January 10 – A fifteenth case of H5N1 is reported in Turkey. However, the Turkish government declares that the virus is "under control".
- January 20 – Turkish police are reported to have taken into custody, Mehmet Ali Ağca, the man who shot Pope John Paul II in 1981 after an appeals court ordered his return to prison to serve more time for killing a journalist.

=== February ===
- February 9 – Istanbul's police chief said a bomb blast at an Internet café in the city had wounded 14 people.

== Deaths ==
- 14 October – Cahit Talas (born 1917), academic
