= Saygı =

Saygı is a Turkish surname. Notable people with the surname include:

- Fikret Mualla Saygı (1903–1967), Turkish painter
- Sıla Saygı (born 1996), Turkish figure skater

== See also ==
- Saygın
