= 2008 in Turkey =

- Centuries: 20th; 21st
- Decades: 1980s; 1990s; 2000s; 2010s; 2020s
- See also: List of years in Turkey

Events in the year 2008 in Turkey.

== Incumbents ==
- President: Abdullah Gül
- Prime Minister: Recep Tayyip Erdoğan
- Speaker: Köksal Toptan

== Sport ==
- 11 May – Turkish Grand Prix won by Felipe Massa of Brazil.

== Deaths ==
- 4 January – Gündüz Tekin Onay
- 22 January – Orhan Aksoy
- 8 March – Sadun Aren
- 20 April – Gazanfer Bilge
- 10 May - Leyla Gencer
- 10 August – Cezmi Kartay
- 19 November – Gündüz Aktan
