= İclal Ersin =

Turkish economist (born 1915)

İclal Ersin Karakaptan
- Born: İclal Ersin; 1915
- Occupation: Banking
- Known for: First female economist of Turkey

İclal Ersin Karakaptan (born in 1915) was the first female Turkish economist. She was also the first female branch manager of a bank in Turkey.

== Biography ==
İclal Ersin was born to Ali Rıza Pasha, an Ottoman cartographer, in 1915. In 1928, she began jobbing at the Adana branch office of the newly founded Türkiye İş Bankası (İşBank). While studying at the Kandilli High School for Girls, she worked in the same bank as an accountant. After a short time, she was appointed accounting manager, and became so the first female bank employee of the İşBank with signing authority.

She was introduced to Mustafa Kemal Atatürk, the founder of the Turkish Republic, by Celal Bayar, the first director general of the bank. She asked Atatürk for an opportunity of further education abroad. In 1939, she obtained a scholarship to study in University of Geneva, Switzerland. In 1941, she returned to Turkey with a PhD title in economics gained upon her doctoral thesis on the "Occupation tax in Turkey". After serving as chief inspector at the Ankara main branch, and as controller in the branch offices of Beyoğlu and Galata in Istanbul, she was appointed manager of the bank's newly opened Nişantaşı branch in Istanbul in 1953, becoming so the first ever Turkish female at this position. She continued for ten years in this post.
