= Erdal Karamercan =

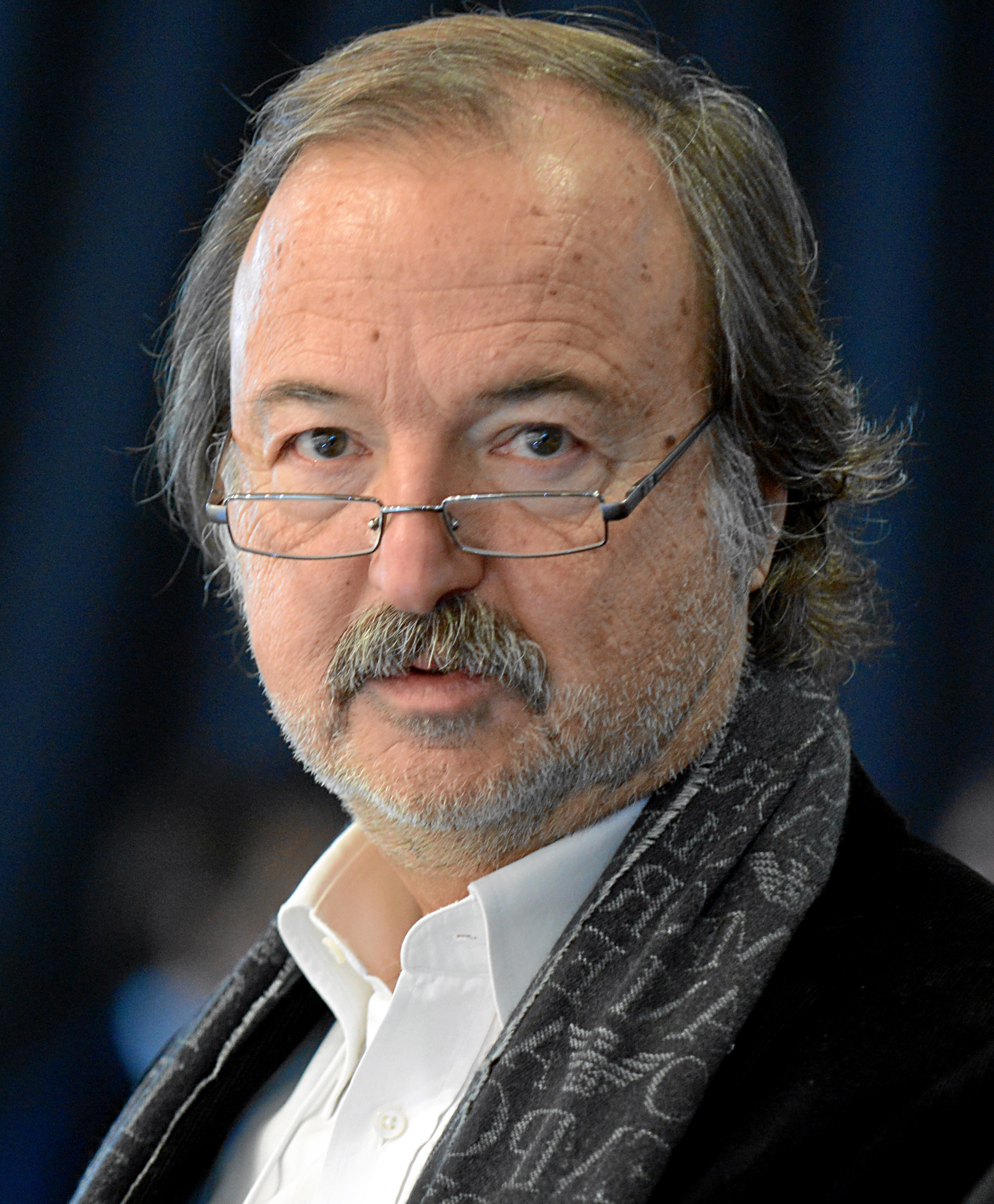
- Karamercan during the WEF, 2013
- Born: 1950 (age 75–76); Istanbul, Turkey
- Education: Chemical engineering
- Alma mater: Boğaziçi University, Istanbul, Turkey; University of Virginia, USA
- Occupation: Vice Chairman of the Board of Directors of Eczacıbasi Holding
- Years active: 2017-Present
- Organization: Eczacıbaşı
- Spouse: Burçin Karamercan
- Children: Berna Karamercan, Rana Karamercan, Mina Karamercan

Dr. Erdal Karamercan (born 1950 in Istanbul) serves as vice-chairman of the Board of Directors of Eczacıbaşı Holding, one of the largest companies of Turkey. He previously served as the CEO between 2003 and 2017.

Karamercan received his high school degree from Istanbul High School, one of the oldest and internationally renowned high schools in Turkey. He received his undergraduate degree in chemical engineering from Boğaziçi University, Istanbul. He obtained his Master's and Ph.D. degrees in chemical engineering from the University of Virginia.

He has had various managerial positions within the Eczacıbaşı Group: Intema Project Manager, Artema Sanitary Fittings Production Manager, General Manager of Ekom Foreign Trade, General Manager of Ipek Kagit Tissue Paper Co, Vice President of Consumer Products Group, Vice President in charge of both Pharmaceuticals and Consumer Products Groups, and, between 2003 and 2017, President and CEO of the Eczacıbasi Group. Currently, he serves as the vice-chairman of the board of directors and is a member of the Presidential Board.

Karamercan holds memberships in various associations: Member and former board member of TUSIAD, The Turkish Industrialists’ and Businessmen's Association, Founding Member and former President of the Turkish Advertisers’ Association, Member of the Board of Trustees of Istanbul High School Education Foundation, Member of the Board of Trustees of FMV Isik University, Member of KAGIDER, the Women Entrepreneurs Association of Turkey and founding member of KALDER, the Quality Association. Other memberships include various foundations, community organizations, and sports clubs.

== Education ==
Having attended one of the oldest high schools of Turkey, Istanbul High School, Karamercan completed his undergraduate degree in chemical engineering at Boğaziçi University, Istanbul, in 1973. As a graduate student in chemical engineering at the University of Virginia, United States, he obtained MSc. in 1975 and PhD in 1977.

== Memberships ==
Karamercan holds memberships in industry associations: former member of TUSIAD (Turkish Industrialists’ and Business Association), vice president of the Turkish Paper Manufacturers’ Union and founding member and ex-president of the Turkish Advertisers’ Association.

== Personal life ==
Karamercan is married and has three daughters.
