= Suha Arın =

Turkish film director, writer, producer and educator

Musta Suha Arın
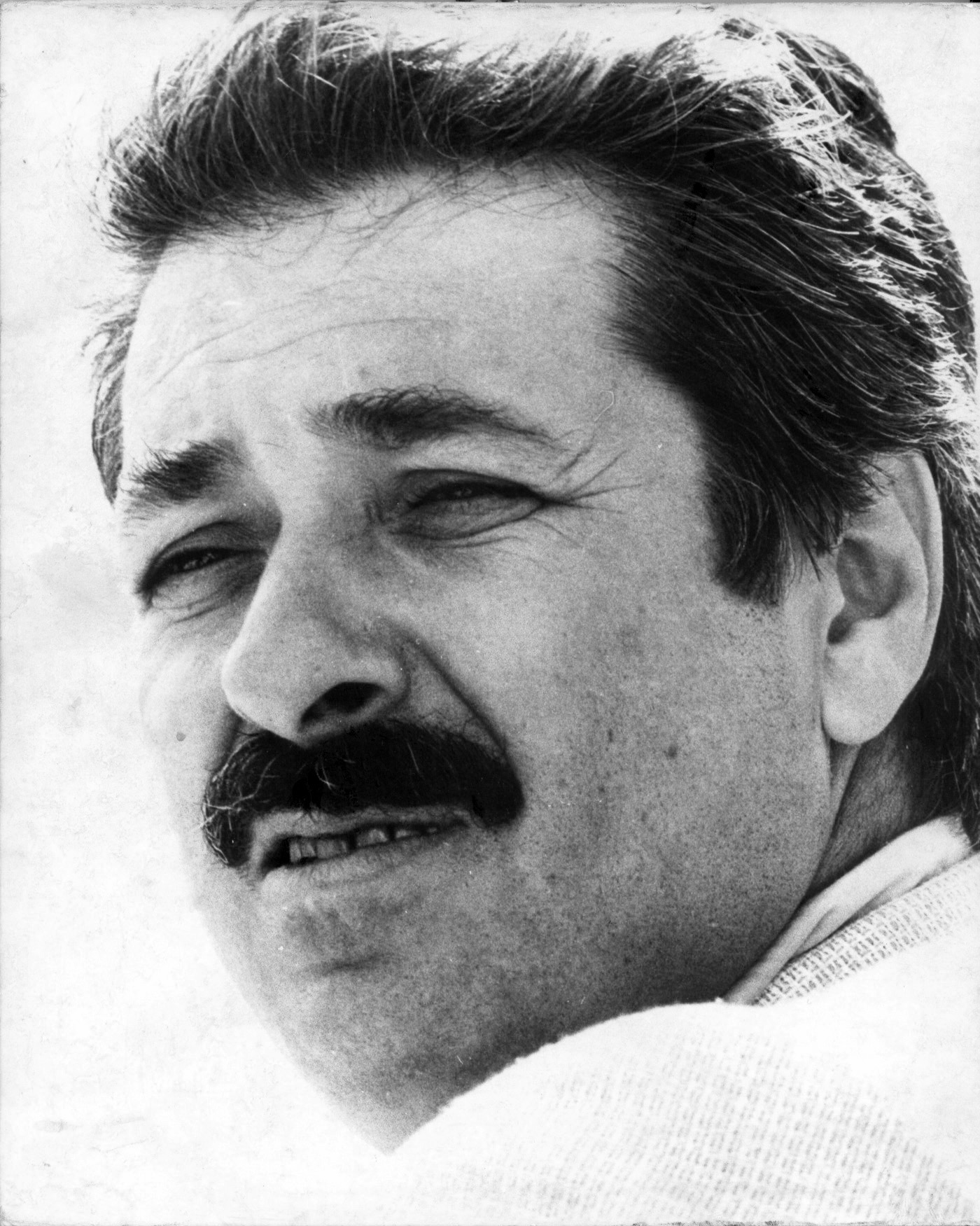
- Born: January 23, 1942; Balikesir, Turkey
- Died: February 1, 2004 (aged 62); Istanbul, Turkey
- Citizenship: Turkey
- Education: Howard University; American University
- Occupations: Film director, writer, producer, educator

Mustafa Suha Arın (23 January 1942 – 1 February 2004) was a Turkish film director, writer, producer and educator.

== Biography ==
He was born in Balikesir, Turkey. He completed his primary and secondary education in Ankara. In 1965, he went to the USA to receive his license degree in film directing from Howard University and his master's degree in mass communication from the American University. He also worked as a translating speaker and interviewer at the Voice of America Radio and as the Washington DC reporter of Turkish Radio and Television. He returned to Turkey in 1974.

In his productive career lasting for 40 years, Suha Arın produced about 50 documentary films, many of which won national and international awards. Arın, who revealed the traditional and contemporary values of Turkish and Anatolian cultures in his films, also had an educator identity. He lectured at many universities over forty years and contributed to the education of many film-makers and academicians. He died at age 62 in Istanbul due to chronic heart failure.

Today, Suha Arın is commonly recognized as a master of the Turkish documentary cinema, not only by his films but also by his approach to the education of documentary film-making.

On February 1, 2004, he died in Istanbul at Haseki Cardiology Institute where he was being treated.

== Filmography ==
- The Ten Colours of Asia Minor - A Film Production Guide to Turkey (2000)
- A Statue of Liberty in Cyprus (1997)
- The Photographs of Denktas (1997)
- Istanbul the Golden City (1996)
- Ayasofia (Hagia Sophia) (1991)
- Topkapi Palace (1991)
- Re-evaluation of Sinan Through Huseyin Anka (1990)
- The Memoirs of Sinan the Architect (1989)
- Until Eternity (1988)
- The Ballad of the Wood (1988)
- The Bounty of Erciyes (1987)
- Poets and Houses (1987)
- When the Fog Dispelled (1986)
- As Euphrates Becomes a Lake (1986)
- The Sweat of Glass (1985)
- The Story of Houses in Anatolia (1984)
- Chora (1984)
- Three Days in Kula (1983)
- The Oil Road of Anatoila (1982)
- Dolmabahce Palace and Atatürk (1981)
- Cemal Resit Rey (1980)
- Ali Izzet Ozkan (1980)
- Forty Thousand Steps in the Covered Bazaar (1980)
- Fatma of the Forest (1979)
- The Eternal Flame of Lycia (1977)
- Life Drops of Istanbul (1977)
- Two Seasons of Urartu (1977)
- Safranbolu: Reflections of Time (1976)
- The World of Midas (1975)
- Turned Out of Their Nest (1975)
- Wells of Worry (1975)
- After the Amnesty (1974)
- Silent Toil (1974)
- From Hattians to Hittites (1974)
- Pride (1968)
- Capital Ankara (1964)
- Road Safety (1964)

== Awards ==
- Aziz Nesin Honour Award of the World Communications Foundation (2000)
- The Honour Award of TURSAK and the History Foundations (1998)
- The Cinema Award of The Year of IFSAK (1998)
- "Until Eternity", the Council of Europe Special Award at the 1990 Bordeaux Festival of Films on Architecture and Urban Planning (1990)
- "Until Eternity", the Architecture Award at the 1990 UNESCO International Art Films Competition
- "Until Eternity", Jury Special Award at the 1989 Lausanne International Film Festival on Architecture and Urbanization (1989)
- "Forty Thousand Steps In The Covered Bazaar", Jury’s Special Award of the Vienna Tourism Films Festival (1985)
- "Three Days In Kula", Antalya Film Festival Golden Orange Award (1983)
- "Fatma of the Forest", First Prize in The Short Film Competition of Turkey Ministry of Culture (1979)
- "Fatma of the Forest", Antalya Film Festival Golden Orange Award (1979)
- "Fatma of the Forest", International Damascus Film Festival Silver Sword Award (1979)
- "Fatma of the Forest", First Prize in The International 3rd Balkan Film Festival (1979)
- "Two Seasons Of Urartu", Sedat Simavı Foundation’s Grand Prize on Mass Communication (1978)
- "Safranbolu: Reflections of Time", Antalya Film Festival Golden Orange Award (1977)
