= Aydın Gün =

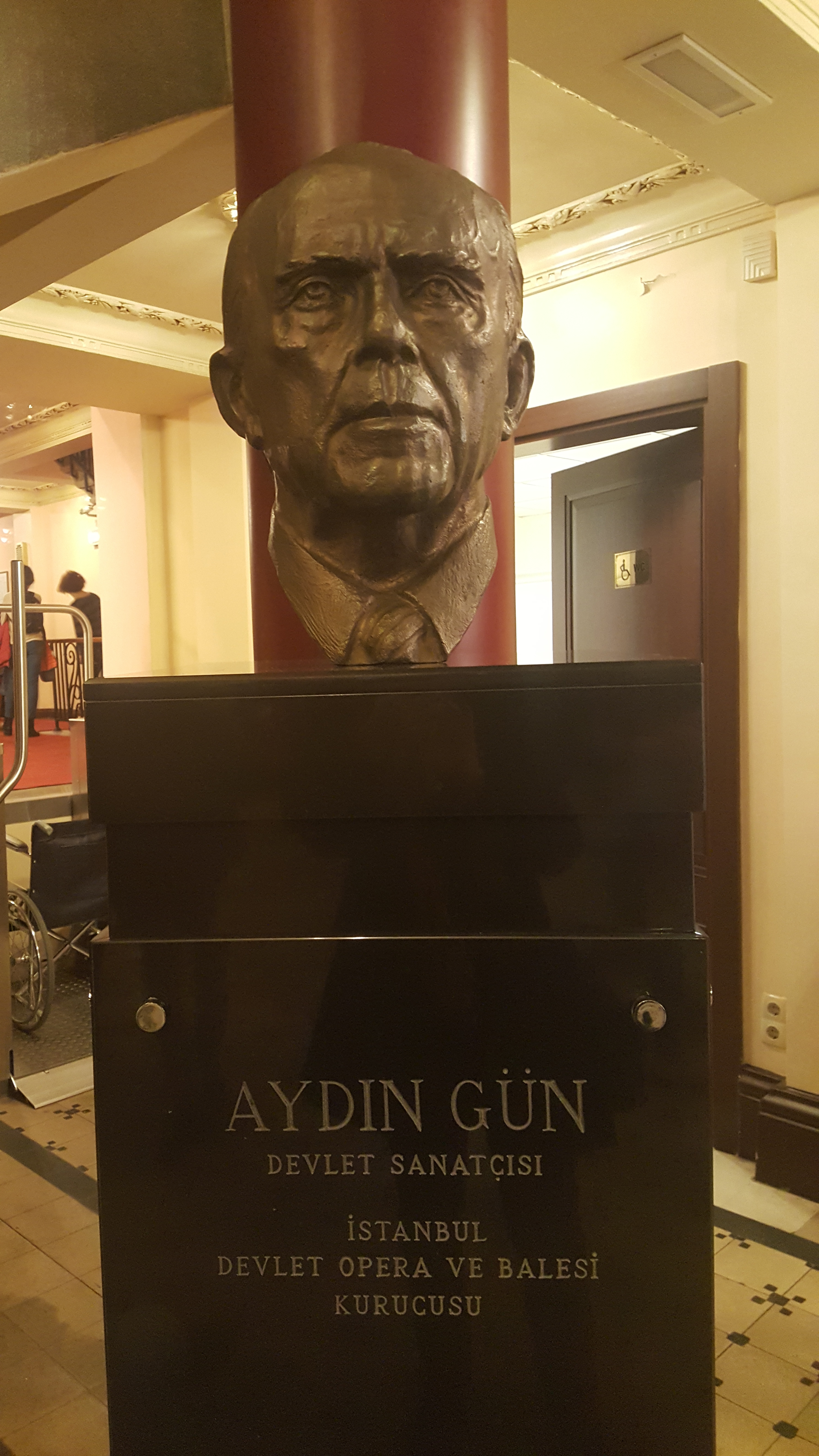

Aydın Gün; (1917, Adana - November 30, 2007, Berlin), was a Turkish opera singer, stage director, founder and intendant of Istanbul Opera House. He was a pioneering figure in the Turkish opera scene and a founding member of the IKSV.
