= Ordal Demokan =

Turkish physicist

Ordal Demokan (January 13, 1946 – October 29, 2004) was a Turkish physicist.

== Biography ==
Born in Istanbul, Turkey, Demokan graduated from TED Ankara Koleji in 1962, and received his B.Sc. and M.Sc. degrees on Electrical Engineering in 1966 and 1967 from Middle East Technical University (METU) in Ankara. He received TÜBITAK scholarship between 1964 and 1967. He received his Ph.D. degree on physics from University of Iowa in 1970, through Fulbright scholarship between 1967 and 1969 and University of Iowa Education Scholarship.

In September 1970, he started working as an assistant professor in the Department of Physics at Middle East Technical University. The plasma physics research in METU is initiated by Ordal Demokan in 1972 with his establishing the plasma physics laboratory. He acquired the title of Associate Professor in 1976. In 1978–1979, he worked as director of TAEK Plasma and Laser Department.

Between 1979 and 1981, he was in Jülich Research Centre's Institute of Plasma Physic as a guest researcher, working on TEXTOR Tokamak Experiment. Afterwards he returned to newly founded Gazi University in Turkey in 1982, where he worked in Faculty of Technical Education between 1982 and 1983. In 1983 he was the chairman of the Department of Electrical and Electronics Engineering.

In 1984 he returned to METU, where he was the assistant chairman of the Department of Physics between 1984 and 1985. He received the title of Professor in 1988.

He was killed in a car crash on October 29, 2004, in Ümitköy, Ankara, when a motorist hit him while he was crossing the road. Driver was a 17-year-old boy, who had no driver's licence. He was buried at Cebeci Asri Cemetery in Ankara.
