= Yazıcı Dam =

- Official name: Yazıcı Barajı
- Location: Ağrı Province, Turkey
- Coordinates: 39.49755°N 43.42346°E
- Construction began: 1995
- Opening date: 2009

Dam and spillways
- Impounds: Altınçayır Creek
- Height: 90 m (300 ft)

Reservoir
- Total capacity: 202 hm^{3} (0.048 cu mi)
- Surface area: 8 km^{2} (3.1 sq mi)

Yazıcı Dam (Turkish: Yazıcı Barajı), also known as Ağrı Yazıcı Dam, is a dam in Ağrı Province, Eastern Anatolia, Turkey. The construction works began in 1995 and the dam went in service in 2009. The development was backed by the Turkish State Hydraulic Works.

== See also ==
- List of dams and reservoirs in Turkey
