= İclal Ar =

Turkish soprano

- Born: 1904
- Died: 2 October 2007 (aged 102–103); Istanbul, Turkey
- Resting place: Rumelihisarı Cemetery
- Occupation: Operatic soprano

İclal Ar (1904 – 2 October 2007) was one of the first Turkish sopranos. She was a member of the Istanbul State Opera and Ballet.

== Early years ==
İclal was born in 1904. She became one of the first opera singers of Turkey.

She found a job as film cutter at İpek Film Studios in Istanbul. Her next job in the studio was to run films for visitors. Film director Muhsin Ertuğrul wanted her to appear in films. However, she rejected that offer. There, she met renowned poet Nâzım Hikmet, who was working as a screenwriter. She remembers that, "although he was already married, Nâzım Hikmet developed a romantic relationship to the red-haired young girl. He wrote songs for operettas featuring red-haired women, and read those to her."

In 1933, she married Vedat Ar, who, coming from Paris, France, started to work as scenic designer at the same film studio. She soon left the film studio and became a housewife. Her husband was later employed at the Istanbul City Theatres.

== Singing career ==
The family held meetings at home with friends from the art circle performing Turkish tango music with accordion played by Necip Celal. During those meetings, Mesut Cemil, then director of Radio Istanbul, offered to have her sing at the radio. She performed a tango of Necip Celal under the pseudonym "Kızıl Ay" ("Red Moon") in relation to her hair color.

In the 1950s, Istanbul Conservatory made efforts to establish a choir under the conduct of Muhittin Sadak. She joined the choir and performed for nine years. During this period, she also served as soloist. She was tutored by Muhittin Sadak and also by Italian composer and singing teacher Italo Brancucci, with whom she also performed recitals.

The first concert of the conservatory choir in 1950 attracted great attention. The choir with 70 members was a major breakthrough in this field for Turkey at the time. The concert featured music by Haydn, Brahms and Schumann. SFaruk Yener, a critic, wrote after the concert that, "she promised a bright future as soprana with her solo performance in the addio." A review from the newspaper Akşam praised her for "her singing quality and volume-sonore" after the second concert of the choir in 1951, at which she solo performed the song Ave Maria of Schubert. The same year, she gave a concert accompanied by Italo Brancucci on the piano. In 1954, she gave a concert together with Ferdi Statzer on the piano broadcast by Istanbul Radio. She gave a concert accompanied by Ferdi Statzer again on 19 May that year, on the Commemoration of Atatürk, Youth and Sports Day.

Meanwhile, Muhsin Ertuğrul initiated the establishment of a singing studio (Turkish: Şan Stüdyosu) in Istanbul as part of the Ankara State Opera. German and Italian music tutors taught Turkish singers in the five-story building with a piano at every floor. She entered the studio after passing an exam. She attended the singing studio for about four years.

After the foundation of Istanbul State Opera, she was admitted to the opera following an entrance exam. İclal Ar starred in the operas The Consul by Gian Carlo notti and Cavalleria rusticana by Pietro Mascagni. She retired from the opera after four years.

== Later years and death ==
In retirement, she devoted herself to handcrafting decorative wax candles. In 1967, she exhibited her 111 of her products in various forms and different colors at the Beyoğlu City Gallery. The decoration of the hall was carried out by her husband. Later, she developed a hobby in photography.

In 2000, she adopted Mine Belkıs Ar (née Kalyoncu) as daughter. İclal Ar died at the age of 103 on 2 October 2007. She had been bedridden after she broke her hip bone at her home in Istanbul one year previously. She was interred in the family grave at Rumelihisarı Cemetery following the religious funeral service held in Zincirlikuyu Mosque. She was survived by her adoptive daughter.
