= Hâlit Ziyâ Konuralp =

Turkish plastic surgeon and academic

Halit Ziya Konuralp
- Born: 1904; Istanbul, Turkey
- Died: 19 April 2005 (aged 100–101); Istanbul, Turkey
- Occupation: Plastic surgeon

Hâlit Ziyâ Konuralp (1904 – 19 April 2005) was a Turkish plastic surgeon and professor. He was an early practitioner of plastic surgery in Turkey and one of the founders of the Turkish Society of Plastic Surgeons.

== Career ==
Konuralp practised plastic surgery at Istanbul University from the 1930s. In 1950, he established a plastic surgery unit at the university.

In 1961, Konuralp was among fifteen surgeons who established the Turkish Plastic Surgery Association. He served as president of the association from 1961 to 1972.
