= Cyprus Memorial Forest in Silifke =

Symbolic military cemetery in Mersin, Turkey

Cyprus Memorial Forest (Cyprus Memorial Cemetery)
- Kıbrıs Hatura Ormanı (Kıbrıs Şehitliği)
- Turkey
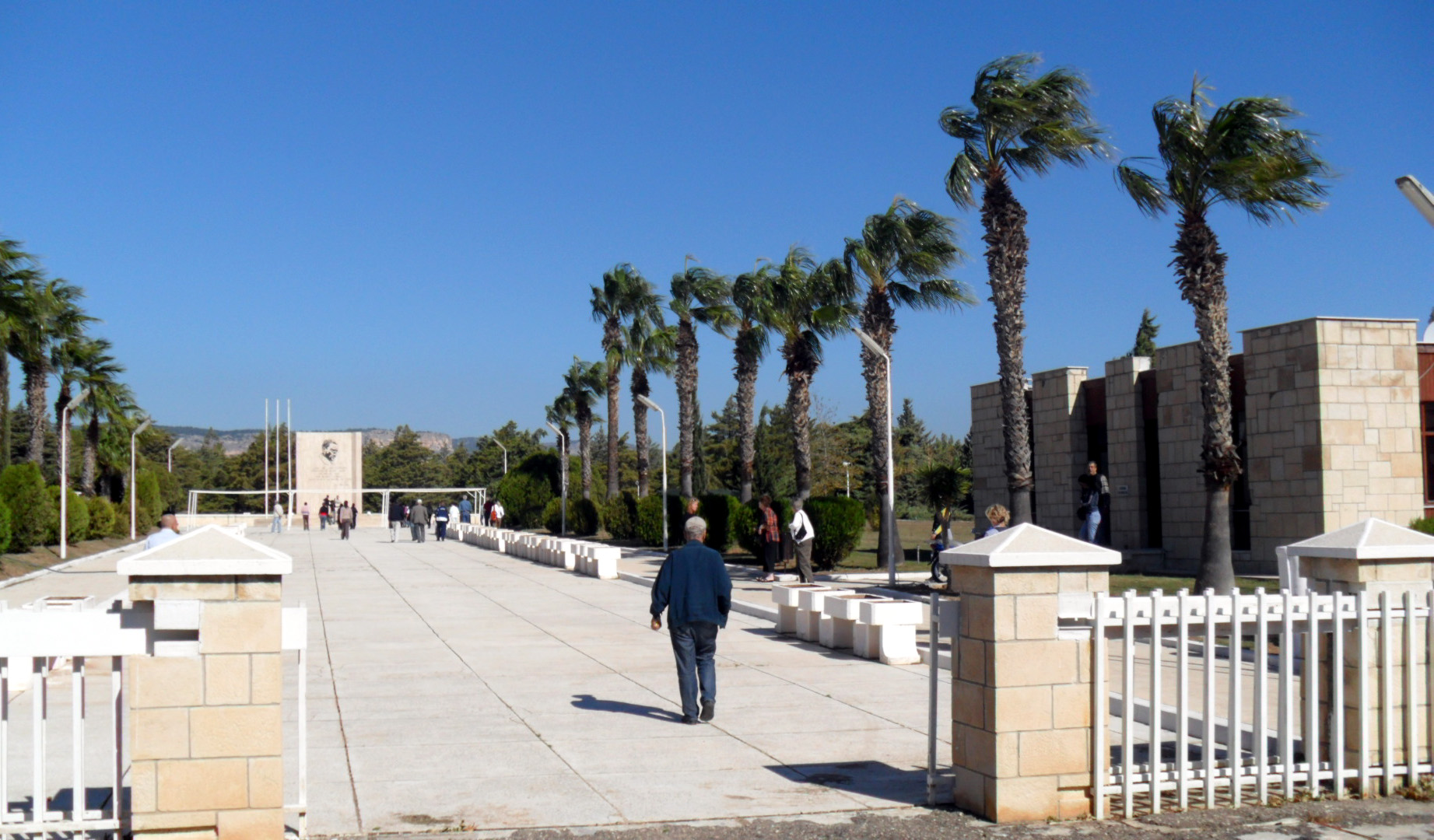
- For Turkish servicemen killed in action during the 1974 Cyprus Invasion
- Established: 1976
- Location: Çamdüzü near Silifke, Mersin, Turkey
- Total burials: 454 (symblic)
- 36°22′48″N 33°52′28″E Location of the military memorial in Turkey

The Cyprus Memorial Forest (Turkish: Kıbrıs Hatura Ormanı), a.k.a. Cyprus Memorial Cemetery (Turkish: Kıbrıs Şehitliği), is a memorial forest including a symbolic military cemetery and an open-air museum dedicated to the Turkish servicemen killed in action during the 1974 Turkish military invasion of Cyprus. Established in 1976, it is located at Silifke district of Mersin Province in southern Turkey.

The memorial place is in a pine woods covering 9 ha (22 acres) at Çamdüzü, 5 km (3.1 mi) west of Silifke on the provincial road 33-58 between Silifke and Gülnar just west of State road D715.

Following the 1974 Cypriot coup d'état, Turkey, under the guise of fearing an intercommunal fighting and killing, intervened .

In 1976, a symbolic cemetery was established in commemoration of 454 Turkish army servicemen. A tree was planted next to each symbolic grave. A monument of Atatürk is erected in the middle of s ceremonial square surrounded by the symbolic graves. Another monument is dedicated to the fallen 220 warriors of the Turkish-Cypriot resistance. There is also a museum at the military memorial, in which weapons like rifles, pistols and ammunition are exhibited. Some heavy military equipment, such as a tank, a howitzer and an armoured personnel carrier, which were captured from the Greek-Cypriot Army, are on display in the open-air museum. The military memorial, which was initially administrated by the National Parks Authority, was later handed over to the Regional Forest Directoriate due to its nature of a forest.

By the summer of 2014, the Regional Forest Directoriate sent the museum's display items to the Mersin Naval Museum on grounds that they are not capable of their maintenance. In December, 2014, the heavy military equipment were transferred to the newly established Mersin Peace Museum, an action, which was highly protested by the local residents. Couple of days later, the open-air museum's articles were returned to the military memorial.

The memorial cemetery hosts an official ceremony every year.
