= Fatma of the Forest =

1979 film by Suha Arın

- Tahtacı Fatma
- Directed by: Suha Arın
- Produced by: Suha Arın
- Music by: Mehmet Erenler; Nevit Kodallı
- Distributed by: MTV Film Televizyon
- Release date: 1979
- Running time: 28 minutes
- Country: Turkey
- Language: Turkish

Fatma of the Forest (Turkish: Tahtacı Fatma) is a 28-minute color Turkish documentary film about Tahtacı people directed by Süha Arın. It was first shown in 1979, the International Year of the Child.

The film shows the life of a 12-year-old Tahtacı girl and her family in the forests of the high Taurus Mountains.

== Crew ==
- Director: Suha Arın
- Assistant Director and Editor: Nesli Çölgeçen, Cemal Karman, Kemal Sevimli, Yalcin Yelence
- Director of Photography: Hasan Ozgen
- Camera: Savas Guvezne
- Music Arrangement: Mehmet Erenler, Nevit Kodallı

== Awards ==
- First Prize in The International 3rd Balkan Film Festival (1979)
- International Damascus Film Festival Silver Sword Award (1979)
- Antalya Film Festival Golden Orange Award (1979)
- First Prize in The Short Film Competition of Turkey Ministry of Culture (1979)
