= Erdal Gezik =

Erdal Gezik is a contemporary writer on Alevis (Kurdish Alevis in particular) and honor crimes in Turkey.

== Books ==
- Etnik, politik dinsel sorunlar bağlamında – Alevi Kürtler, 2000, Ankara, Kalan Yayınları.

[Alevi Kurds; in perspective of ethnic, political and religious problems]

- Eer, Identiteit en Moord; een vergelijkende studie tussen Nederland, Duitsland en Turkije, 2003, Utrecht.

[Honor, Identity and Crime: a comparative study between the Netherlands, Germany and Turkey]

- Raa Haqi - Riya Haqi: Dersim Aleviliği İnanç Terimleri Sözlüğü, 2010, Ankara, Kalan Yayınları

[The path of True: a dictionary of Dersim Alevism]

== Articles ==
- Dersim 38 ve Öncesinde Toplumsal Yaşam – sözlü tarih metodu, 1998, Amsterdam.

[Dersim before 1938- Stories of daily life. A local guide for oral history.]

- Doğu Aleviliğinde Seyitlik ve Yakın Tarihte Geçirdiği Değişimler, in: Yeni Binyılda Dersim (ed. A. Dersimi), Munich, 2000.

[The institution of Seyit in east Anatolian Alevism and its transformation in modern times]

- Unutulmuş bir kral ve taraftarlarının hikayesi; yılanın Dersim maceralarının deneysel bir analizi, 2000, Munzur Dergisi nr 1, p. 4-29.

[The story of a forgotten king and his followers; an analysis of serpent beliefs in Dersim region]

- Munzur ve Düzgün’un sıroluşlarının tarihsel bir analiz, 2000, Munzur Dergisi nr. 4, 15–29.

[A historical analysis of the disappearance of the saints Munzur and Düzgün]

- Alevilik ve Hıristiyanlık: ortak geçmis mi, ortak gelecek mi, 2003, Munzur Dergisi, nr 15, p. 4-27.

[Alevism and Christianity: a common past or a common future?]

- Seref, Kimlik ve Cinayet: Namus Cinayetleri Uzerine Bir Arastirma, Kalan Yayinlari:Ankara, 2003.
- Aşiret’ten Cumhuriyet’e iki Alevi örneıi: Varto ve Koçgiri, 2005, Kırkbudak (Journal of Anatolian Folk Beliefs), nr 4, p. 27-48.

[From Tribe to Republic - two Alevi cases: Varto and Koçgiri]

- Elke, Qerte Boz ve Gul u Gulistan: Dersim bölgesinde kültür ve dinsel geleneklere bir gece bakışı, 2008, Munzur Dergisi nr. 29, p. 4-26,

[Traditional beliefs in Dersim region; from the perspective of the night]

- Ciralik – Hak, Pir ve Talip adına bir katkı sistemine dair, 2009, Munzur Dergisi nr. 31, p. 4-34.

[Ciralik – a material contribution system in the name of God, Pir and Talip]

- Nesimi Kılagöz ile yaratılış üzerine, 2009, Munzur Dergisi nr. 32, p. 4-34.

[An Alevi version of creation by Nesimi Kılagöz]

- Over de eermoorden en hun tegenstanders, 2002, Rechtshulp (maandblad voor de sociale praktijk), nr 6/7, p. 33-38.

[About honor crimes and its opponents]

- Over Eerwraak, in: Wankele Waarden, 2003, Utrecht, p. 174-181

[About honor crimes]

== Sources ==
- Gaye Okyay (29 August 2004). "Töre cinayetlerinin faili töreler değil insanlar". BirGün. Archived from the original (interview with Erdal Gezik) on 27 September 2011.
- Erdal Gezik (2000). "Haci Bektaş-i Veli ve Kürt Meslektaşlari". Alevi Kürtler. Kalan Yayınları. pp. 141–176. ISBN 978-975-8424-10-8.
