= Leyla Gamsiz Sarptürk =

Turkish artist

Leylâ Gamsız Sarptürk (1921–2010) was a female Turkish artist who led the trend of combining western and traditional arts in the 1950s.

Self portrait in the Women's Museum İstanbul.

== Biography ==
Leylâ Gamsız Sarptürk frequently switched schools in her childhood to accommodate to her father's work. Her teacher Eşref Üren in high school first discovered her artistic talent. After high school, Sarptürk wanted to attend the Academy of Fine Arts to continue studying painting. However, the academy only accepted secondary school graduates, thus she ended up studying geography at the Istanbul University. In 1949 Sarptürk earned a scholarship after opening her first solo exhibition, and she studied painting in Paris for a year. She married her classmate Hulusi Sarptürk that year, and they moved to Hendek after marriage for Hulusi's teaching profession. Sarptürk worked as a painter until 2000. She died on 13 July 2010 in Istanbul when she was 89.

== Life as an artist ==
After attending college Sarptürk did not give up on her dream of becoming a painter: when she was 26, Sarptürk participated in a group called “10s,” a group that was active until 1953, aiming to “synthesis the East and the West gradually from the road of Eyuboglu and take the Turkish picture further.” The group opened exhibitions, making huge influence on Turkish art. Leyla Gamsız Sarptürk dedicated herself to art until she stopped painting in 2000, and she became a predominant figure in Turkish art field in the 1950s. Sarptürk's art style was sincere and decisive; she commonly distorted the form of the figures in the painting to emphasize visual maturity. Leyla Gamsız Sarptürk won the Academy Award twice in 1964 and 1967 and the 11th Simavi Foundation Visual Arts Award in 1987. Leyla Gamsız Sarptürk hold her last exhibition in Atatürk Cultural Center in 2000, and she was already 79 at that time.
