= Erdal Pekdemir =

Turkish footballer

Personal information
- Full name: Erdal Pekdemir
- Date of birth: 13 June 1992 (age 34)
- Place of birth: Piraziz, Turkey

Team information
- Current team: Karaköprü Belediyespor

Youth career
- 2004–2005: Ordu İl Özel İdare Spor
- 2005–2011: Orduspor

Senior career*
| Years | Team | Apps | (Gls) |
| 2011–2014 | Orduspor | 1 | (0) |
| 2014–2015 | Yeni Amasyaspor | 21 | (1) |
| 2015 | Güzelorduspor | | |
| 2016 | Yozgatspor 1959 | | |
| 2017–2020 | Serik Belediyespor | 36 | (0) |
| 2020– | Karaköprü Belediyespor | 1 | (0) |
- * Club domestic league appearances and goals as of 20 September 2020

Erdal Pekdemir (born 13 June 1992) is a Turkish footballer who plays for Karaköprü Belediyespor. He made his Süper Lig debut on 18 May 2013.
