= Turkish tango music =

Turkish tango music is an established variation of the Argentine tango but whose rhythm follows the Ballroom tango. It was one of the most popular music forms for decades in Turkey.Tango arrived in Turkey soon after the nation was formed in 1924. Seyyan Hanim recorded the first Turkish language tango, Necip Celal's Mazi ("The Past"), in 1932. Tango orchestras and singers include Fehmi Ege, Mustafa Sükrü, Kadri Cerrahoglu, Necdet Koyuturk, Celal Ince, Secaattin Tanyerli, Birsen Alsan, Ibrahim Ozgur, Mefharet Atalay, Birsen Hanim, Afife Hanim, Saime Sengul, Nezahat Onaner, Zehra Eren, and Orhan Avsar.
