= Okan Demiriş =

Turkish composer

Okan Demiriş (9 February 1942, in Istanbul – 18 June 2010) was a Turkish composer. He was married to the soprano Leyla Demiris.

His works include several operas:

- IV. Murat (pronounced Dördüncü Murat) libretto: Turan Oflazoğlu three acts, based on the life of Murad IV.
- 1977-79 Karyağdı Hatun, libretto: Nezihe Araz in three acts
- 1982-83 Yusuf ile Züleyha, libretto: Nezihe Araz.
