= Cahit Kıraç =

Turkish politician

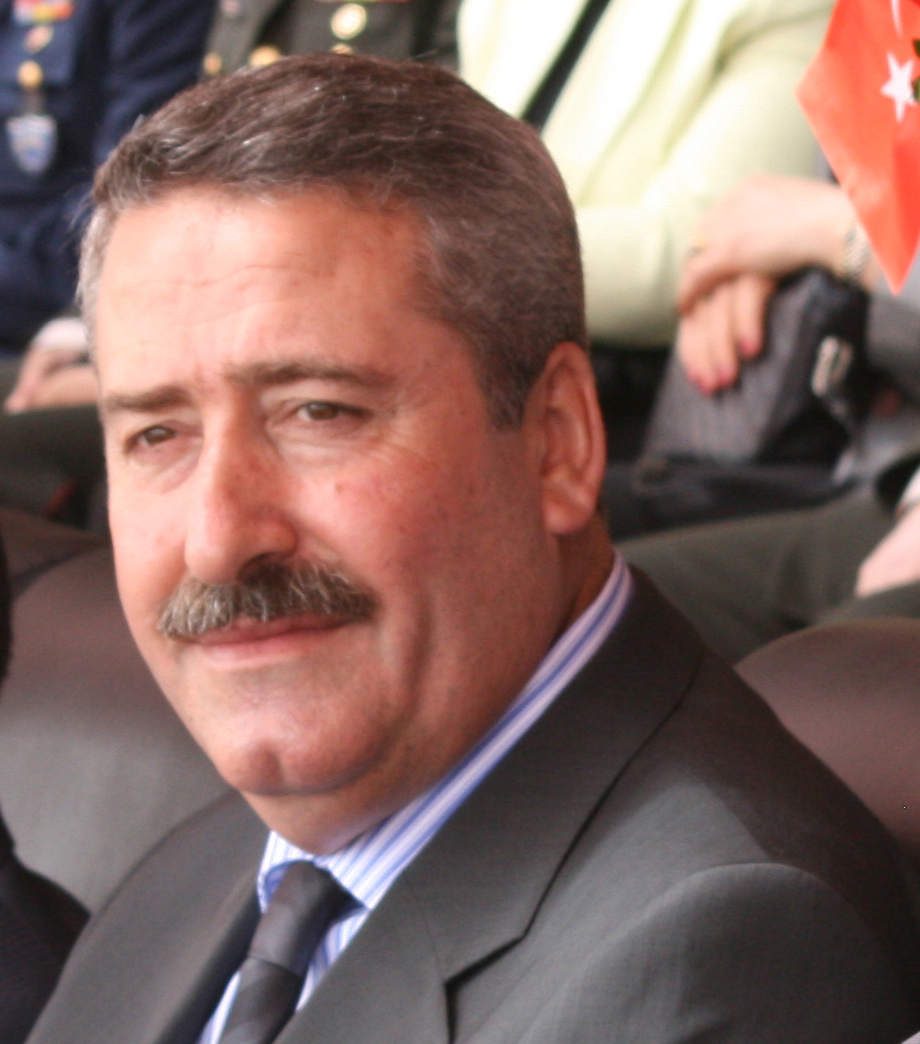

Mustafa Cahit Kıraç (born 1956) is the governor of Diyarbakır Province in Turkey. Consecutively, he is former governor of İzmir, Adana, Sakarya, Aksaray and Şırnak provinces.

== Personal Background ==
M. Cahit Kıraç was born and graduated from both primary school and high school in Elazığ. In 1979, he graduated from Ankara University, Faculty of Political Sciences.

Cahit Kıraç started his career in March 1980 as Elazığ district governor candidate. He served as deputy district governor and mayor in Diyadin district of Ağrı and as deputy district governor in Tutak district. Between March 1, 1983 and October 31, 1986, he served as district governor in Hatay's Hassa district. Between January 13, 1986 and September 12, 1988, he served as district governor in Diyarbakır's Kulp district. Between September 15, 1988 and May 23, 1992, he served as deputy governor of Erzurum. During this period, he was sent to England for one year by the Ministry of Interior for language training. Between May 25, 1992 and March 12, 1993, he served as the Head of the Administrative and Financial Affairs Department of the Ministry of Interior.
