= Hüseyin Avni Coş =

Turkish civil servant (1959–2021)

Governor of Sakarya
- In office 9 June 2014 – 21 June 2017
- President: Recep Tayyip Erdoğan
- Preceded by: Mustafa Büyük
- Succeeded by: İrfan Balkanlıoğlu

Personal details
- Born: 1959 Eğirdir, Isparta, Turkey
- Died: 30 July 2021 (aged 62) Istanbul, Turkey
- Spouse(s): Sıdıka Zeynep (divorced 2006); Aylin Özer (2009–2021)
- Children: 3 daughters
- Education: Ankara University
- Occupation: Bureaucrat

Hüseyin Avni Coş (1959 – 30 July 2021) was a Turkish bureaucrat who served as governor of Sakarya Province in Turkey.

He had worked as a governor in many different cities in Turkey.

== Education ==
He graduated from Ankara University Faculty of Political Sciences's Economics and Finance Department in 1981.

== Career ==
His posts in the government included Parish Governor Deputy, Akkus, İmranlı, Shirvan governorships, Emergency Regional Governor (Diyarbakir) Assistant, Ministry of Interior, APK Board and the Civil Defense Directorate General in the Department of the Civil Service Inspectorate, Civil Service Chief Inspector, Bingol and Aksaray. He was appointed Ministry of Interior on 10 June 2009.

== Personal life and death ==
Hüseyin Avni Coş broke up with his first wife, Sıdıka Zeynep in 2006. He has two daughters from his first marriage. In 2009, he married for the second time to lawyer Aylin Özer. They had another daughter in September 2010. Hüseyin Avni Coş, who suffered from a heart attack at his home in Istanbul on 30 July 2021, died at the age of 62 in the hospital he was admitted to.
