= Erdal Saygın =

Turkish educator (1931–2007)

Erdal Saygın (1931–2007) was a Turkish educator and university administrator who served for six years (1992–1998) as the rector of the İzmir Institute of Technology. He was the first academic in the institution's top position upon its founding in 1992.
