= Turkey–United States relations =

- Turkey: United States

Diplomatic mission
- Embassy of Turkey, Washington, D.C.: Embassy of the United States, Ankara

Envoy
- Turkish Ambassador to the United States Sedat Önal: U.S. Ambassador to Turkey Tom Barrack

Turkey and the United States established diplomatic relations in 1927. After World War II, relations evolved from the Second Cairo Conference in December 1943 and Turkey's entry into World War II on the side of the Allies in February 1945. Later that year, Turkey became a charter member of the United Nations. Since 1945, both countries have strengthened ties under the liberal international order advanced by the U.S., a set of global, rule-based, structured relationships grounded in political and economic liberalism. As a consequence, bilateral relations have advanced under the G20, OECD, Council of Europe, OSCE, WTO, IMF, the World Bank, the Euro-Atlantic Partnership Council, and NATO.

During the interwar period (1918–1939), Turkey and the United States laid the groundwork for cooperation without a defined strategic interest. The U.S. sent a Congressional delegation to emphasize trade and business, along with non-missionary philanthropy and other cultural enterprises, such as archaeological expeditions sponsored by American universities.

During World War II (1939–1945), oil was set to become increasingly important to American interests. Roosevelt had a geo-strategic plan in mind at the Anglo-American Petroleum Agreement in 1944. His successor, President Truman, stressed the importance of Turkey's geo-strategic location and its "proximity to the great natural resources". In the following decades, as the United States has been engaged in oil wars in the Middle East, Turkey has supported the U.S. in some capacity, directly or indirectly, by giving authorization for the use of the Incirlik Air Base. After World War II, the Mandate for Palestine, which was established within the former Ottoman vilayet of Syria after the dissolution and partition of the Ottoman Empire, was terminated by the result of the Israeli Declaration of Independence on May 14, 1948. The United States recognized Israel on January 31, 1949, and Turkey followed suit on March 28, 1949. Four decades later, Turkey recognized the Palestinian Declaration of Independence on the same day it was announced – November 15, 1988. Even before the Cold War, relations between Turkey and the United States regarding the Middle East were set on a course based on two dimensions: The first dimension was petroleum politics, and the second dimension was the fate of the Palestinians (Palestinian territories and two-state solution).

During the Cold War (1945–1991), the Turkish Straits crisis of 1945 developed over the request by Joseph Stalin for Soviet military bases in the Turkish Straits as part of Soviet territorial claims against Turkey, which prompted the United States to declare the Truman Doctrine in 1947. In 1947, the Office of Defense Cooperation Turkey was established as part of the United States Security Assistance Organizations to assist in modernization programs, develop interoperability, promote cooperation, and integrate Turkey into the Western system. As a result of this integration, Turkey became part of intelligence operations (1960 U-2) and missile systems (1962 Missile Crisis). At the same time, the geopolitical strategy of Containment prompted a Soviet response in the form of increased communist influence in Turkey. In 1964, President Johnson disclosed Western powers' reluctance to defend Turkey in what became known as the Johnson letter. The U.S. war on drugs created a backlash when Turkish farm workers employed in Turkey's poppy production lost their jobs. Anti-Americanism developed among left-wing extremists in Turkey. In 1969, Amb. Komer's car was set on fire by the Marxist-Leninist Dev-Genç during his visit of Kurdaş at the Middle East Technical University, in which the nascent institution was developed using the aid given by the United States. In the coming years, Turkey became a front for the clashes between far-left and far-right militant groups, as the political violence in Turkey (1976–1980) developed as part of the worldwide incidents of left-wing terrorism aimed at overthrowing the liberal and capitalist governments and replacing them with communist or socialist regimes. One of the organizations involved in the terrorism in Turkey was the Kurdistan Workers' Party (PKK). PKK underwent a significant transformation through its history, evolving from an opposition group (anti-imperialist, anti-American) to eventually serving as an intermediary for U.S. regional objectives. Another dimension was developed by Carter's APNSA Brzezinski, a devout Roman Catholic whose father was posted to the Soviets during persecution of Christians. Brzezinski viewed political Islam primarily through a geopolitical lens and argued for the Green Belt Theory to prevent the spread (e.g., Operation Cyclone) using the plight of Muslims as an ideological attack. President Reagan, in a speech to the National Association of Evangelicals, labeled the Soviet Union an "evil empire" based on suppressing religion and human freedom. In the U.S. State Department's Country Reports on Human Rights Practices, Turkey's secular practices were criticized early on as counter to freedom of religion in Turkey. The Islamic preacher Hoca Fethullah Gülen was imprisoned in 1971 for his religious subversion by the secular Kemalist government. Despite early pressure, the Gülen movement continued to gain traction during the center-right Presidencies of Özal (1989 – 1993) and Demirel (1993 – 2000), not just locally but internationally. Allegations connecting this movement to the CIA were frequent claims, centering on Fethullah Gülen's long-term U.S. residency and geopolitical tensions. Both the PKK, based on separationist idealogy, and the Gülen movement, based on moderate Muslim, continued to be an issue past the Cold War. According to the U.S. State Department, the United States has an interest in keeping Turkey anchored to the Euro-Atlantic community. During and after the Cold War, the U.S. supported the accession of Turkey to the European Union, as Turkey would be aligned with European norms and standards in many domains.

Post Cold War, bilateral relations faced a shifting dynamic: morphed into a complex, uneven partnership defined by strategic cooperation, regional divergence, and deep political friction. In 1996, the U.S. developed a clean break from the Cold War balance of power in the Middle East, in which Jordan and Turkey were to "contain, destabilize, and roll back" entities posing threats. September 11 attacks pulled the U.S. into the Middle East. Turkey stood aligned with the U.S. through a strategic partnership. Both countries shared goals in combating radical extremist networks, counterterrorism, and managing security dynamics in the Middle East during the War on Terror. The 1999 imprisonment of Öcalan with the CIA's help was a turning point in Turkey-Syria relations. The 2008 Syria-Israel peace talks were achieved through Turkey's active engagement, with Erdoğan literally serving as the go-between. Turkey provided full support to the U.S. Afghanistan mission through one of its best diplomats, Hikmet Çetin, as the first NATO Senior Civilian Representative in Afghanistan, the highest-level political representative of NATO in Kabul, where he had held the command of the International Security Assistance Force (ISAF) during that period. Turkey and the U.S. aligned 100% in Afghanistan. Wesley Clark cited a Pentagon policy and outline of a plan to "take out seven countries in five years," great-power in the Middle East. Turkey did not align 100% with U.S. goals in Iraq; in both the 1991 Iraq and the 2003 Iraq interventions, it was concerned about territorial integrity. U.S. did not align 100% with Turkey's goals to peaceful nuclear energy. The Turkish public opinion showed a decline in U.S. support after every intervention. The Turkish media reflected the same sentiments, and the Amb. Edelman publicly criticized the depictions.

Over the 2010s, the "signs of deterioration" were visible. Turkey evolved into a much more independent geopolitical player, but it also became less predictable. As regional instability increased, Turkey was no longer an "island of stability" for the United States but a source of new, often unexpected regional impulses. The decade began with Turkey, entangled with public and legal issues, which Erdoğan met with total honesty and zero softening to Obama [normalize relations between Palestinians and Israelis]: "we don't need any other problems" following the nine activists killed during the flotilla raid. Relations in the 2010s looked like a soliloquy that began with the Turkey migrant crisis as refugees were arriving mainly from the Syrian theater, in which Turkey's call for a safe zone was rejected. Turkey's relations with the US were also affected by the Iran Nuclear issues in the early 2010s; the U.S. rejected the "Tehran Deal". Turkey was there when Libya turned into a failed state, and Gates criticized Turkey for not "Holding up its end!" while Turkey criticized the mission goals. In these conflicts, Turkey and the US did not see eye to eye. The failed coup d'état of 2016 was a major point in the relations; some strong words were exchanged between allies. Turkey's decision-making centers examined how close the coup d'état brought them to fracturing their unity; the Sèvres syndrome. When later asked: “Being strong both at the table and on the ground is not an option for us but an obligation," the U.S. "Blocs & Alliances" were degrading. Turkey decoded ByLock and quickly investigated the social structure. In less than a year, Turkey began purges in the state apparatus. Turkey sacked 87 army generals, 32 admirals, and 30 air force generals from the TAF. After bleeding out its command staff, the TAF moved into the Syrian theater facing America's partner. SOTH Pelosi declared the withdrawal of U.S. forces from advancing TAF as an abandonment of Kurdish partners; she used the word "Betrayal of Allies." During a pool spray, a little over a year ago, Erdogan off the cuff said to VP Biden; "Whether it be PYD, where it be PKK, whether it be YPG, whether it be the HKPC, or whether it be ISIS, ... They're all terrorist organizations at the end of the day, and terrorists will be terrorists regardless of our [the U.S.] mentalities [dress them]." An unexpected outcome of the failed coup d'état was related to several rebel F-16s targeting the presidential jet and bombing the parliament, in which the NATO IFF system was a factor in any form of resistance to these agents. At the time, modernization of the Turkish air defense system was debated; the decision was made in 2017.

Over the 2020s, the "single to multipolar system". A sanctions package, followed by the Armenian Genocide bill, passed on October 29, 2019, following Turkey's offensive into northeastern Syria. Ranking Rep. McCaul said, "This will send another signal to Erdoğan to stop ethnic cleansing, to stop this aggressive behavior, and I think these two bills together will tie in very well." Second biggest military in NATO cut off from NATO procurement. In 2021, not Trump but the succeeding Biden recognized the Armenian genocide. The political deterioration was evident. Trump's SecState Pompeo, an outspoken advocate of Christian Zionism, who considered Turkey a totalitarian Islamist dictatorship, criticized Turkey's position on pre-Islamic cultural heritage. Pompeo approached Greece to establish a strategic footprint to counter Turkey directly, what was known as the "3+1" grouping (Israel, Greece, Cyprus + U.S.). Trump's successor, Biden, called Erdoğan an "Autocrat" and said support those elements ... get more and embolden ... to take on and defeat him. The foreign electoral intervention dispute was part of the 2023 presidential election, mimicking 2016 United States elections. Turkey, which supported Ukraine's territorial integrity, did not align 100% with U.S. goals in resolving the issue. Biden's SecState Blinken continued to develop "3+1" grouping. There was a short normalization in Israel-Turkey relations with the help of the U.S., Erdogan-Netanyahu shaking hands. However, the goodwill deteriorated between the two leaders very quickly due to deteriorating conditions of Palestinians. Erdogan called the U.S. ally "any less than what Hitler did," and Netanyahu responded in kind while SecState Blinken performed multiple trips to the region facing a cold reception. Biden, self-declared Zionist, criticized Erdogan acting like an anti-semite through a statement from DoS. Notes [diplomatic] exchanged on criticism of Israel, antisemitism and weaponization of antisemitism. Erdoğan criticized Biden and United States support for Israel in the Gaza war for what he viewed as complicity in Israeli actions in Gaza. Turkey welcomed the Biden's successor Trump's call for ceasefire in Gaza. FM Fidan's visit to SecState Rubio at DoS and the detention of Öztürk over what she wrote coincided. Turkey joined South Africa's genocide case against Israel, on the other hand the U.S. declared they’re dismantling the ICC The U.S. had to choose how to wind down Syria; Turkey sided with the unified strong political system; Israel opposed. On August 17, 2026, Abu al-Duhur airport bombing targeted the Turkish forces during the period when the Turkish court had an arrest warrant for Netanyahu. In the first quarter of the 21st century, Israel's strategic security needs obliged Turkey to develop a regional reordering in Mecca, "multi-alignment".

According to the U.S. Department of State, Turkey has been a key partner for U.S. policy in the surrounding region. Turkey has partnered with the U.S. for security in Afghanistan (ISAF), and serves as NATO's vital eastern and southern anchor, controlling (per the Montreux Convention of 1936) the Turkish Straits. Turkey has contributed and continues to contribute to international security alongside U.S. forces in Europe (e.g., in Bosnia, IFOR, KFOR, Baltic Air Policing, etc.), and in the seas bordering the Horn of Africa. Turkey borders Georgia (Russo-Georgian War), Azerbaijan (Nagorno-Karabakh conflict), Iraq (Iraqi conflict), Syria (Syrian civil war) and Iran (hostile to the United States since the revolution in 1979). Conflicts in these countries have affected Turkey-United States relations.

== Background ==
After 1780, the United States began relations with North African countries and the Ottoman Empire. In the early 1800s, the US fought the Barbary Wars against the Barbary states under Ottoman suzerainty. The Ottomans severed diplomatic relations with the United States on April 20, 1917, after the United States declared war on Germany on April 4, 1917, because of the Ottoman–German alliance. The United States re-established normal diplomatic relations with the Ottoman Empire's successor state, Turkey, in 1927.

The strategic partnership characterized the exceptionally close economic and military relations between the two during the Cold War and the War on Terror.

=== Strategic partnership during Cold War ===
From 1952 to 1991, the relationship was premised on a "mutuality of benefits".

Mutuality of benefits
| United States | Turkey |
|---|---|
| 1. Security guarantees against the Soviet Union. | 1. Stationed and based troops and equipment for defensive and intelligence-gathering purposes 2. Grantee of Turkish control (Bosporus and Dardanelles straits) over Soviet access to the Mediterranean; 3. Turkish co-belligerency in case of an attack 4. Contain Turkish-Greek tensions. |

Establishment of the Central Treaty Organization. John Foster Dulles arrives in Ankara for signing of the Baghdad Pact

After participating with United Nations forces in the Korean War, Turkey joined the North Atlantic Treaty Organization in 1952. The second-largest army belongs to Turkey in NATO and host of the Allied Land Command headquarters including the Incirlik (1955–present) and Konya Airbases (2000–present).

Turkey was a founding member of the Central Treaty Organization (CENTO), which promoted shared political, military, and economic goals similar to, and modeled after, NATO. The US pressured and promised military and economic aid in exchange for Turkey becoming a founding member. The US was not a member. The defensive organization never became functional partly due to the lack of leadership, as SecState Dulles claimed that the administration could not obtain Congressional approval."

The U.S. actively supported Turkey's membership bid to join the European Union. It frequently lobbied on behalf of Ankara through its diplomatic missions in the capitals of EU member states.

=== Strategic partnership during the War on Terror ===
In 2001, the relationship began with the premise that the United States would foster cooperation on counterterrorism, law enforcement, and military training and education. Turkey remained a close ally of the United States and provided support in the War on Terror.

Base of Cooperation
| Turkey | United States |
| Goal: Territorial Integrity | Goal: Achieve stability and a reduced threat of terrorism from Iraq and Afghanistan |
|---|---|
| 1. ? | 1. Joint counterterrorism efforts.; 2. Use of Turkish bases and territory for cargo transport.; 3. Control and distribution of the arms sales.; 4. Involvement of Turkish non-combat troops and trainers in Afghanistan and Iraq. |

After the September 11 attacks, President George W. Bush coined the phrase "They hate our way of life" [to disrupt and end a way of life]. In this analysis rejection of Western universal values, "Clash of Civilizations", was the driving force, and Moderate Muslim was the solution. The US and American foreign policy groups looked for "moderate Muslims" to counter violent extremism, promote democratic values, and build alliances with the Islamic world. RAND Corporation suggested funding and supporting secular, liberal, and Sufi Muslim networks to spread pluralistic ideas. Fethullah Gülen and his liberal "Turkish Islam" movement were presented as moderate Islamists. It was claimed that Gülen's movement seems to have no aspiration to establish political power.

War on Terror: Soft Power

Promoting Liberal Alternatives

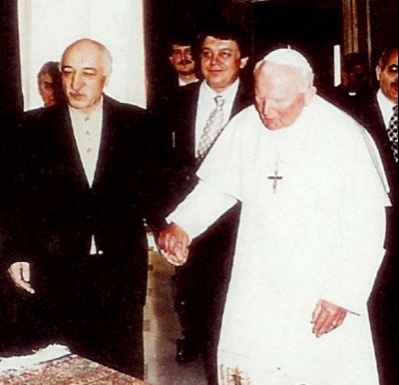
Gulen a moderate Muslim, promoting interfaith dialogue.

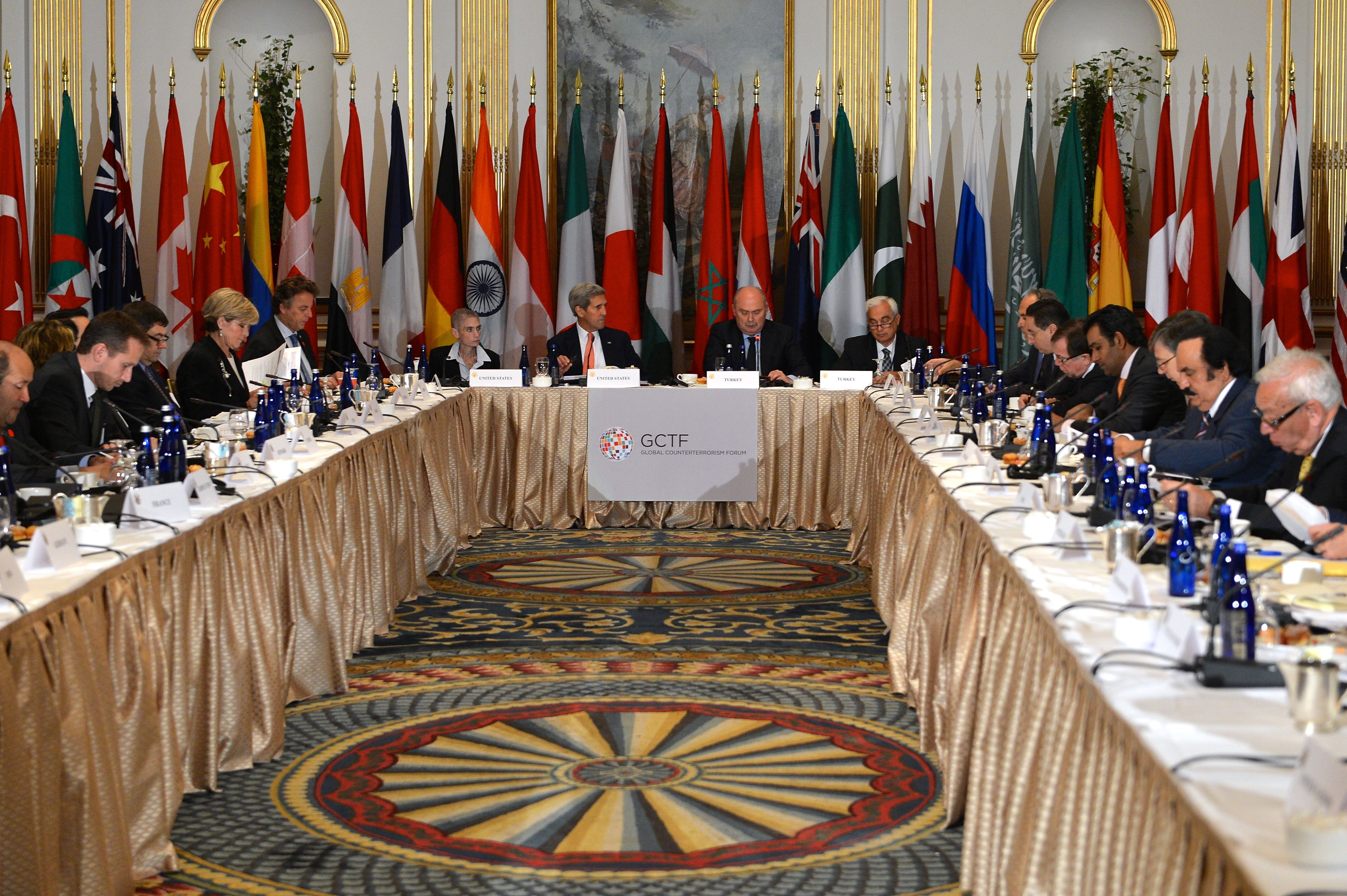
Global Counterterrorism Forum: SoS John Kerry (left) (Terrorism in the United States) and FM Feridun Sinirlioglu (right) (Terrorism in Turkey)

In 2005, PM Erdoğan sponsored the Alliance of Civilizations (AOC) initiative. In 2013, the US and Turkey created a $200 million fund to help stem extremism by undercutting the ideological and recruiting appeal of jihadists in places like Somalia, Yemen, and Pakistan. The program was based on the role of education in preventing violent extremism and deradicalizing young people. The aim was to develop countering values to prevent violent extremism. It was the first global effort to support local, community-level initiatives that strengthen democratic values and empathy toward enemies. When asked, John Kerry defined the strategic goal: "It's a different kind of challenge, and we believe we need to intensify our efforts to address the underlying factors that lead down the path of violence. It's about building foundational security, challenging the narrative of violence to refuse to justify the slaughtering of people."

During the 2010s, the Turkish model was debated during the Obama presidency. Critics argued that the idea of a clash between Western and Islamic civilizations, and thus the Alliance of Civilizations, was overgeneralized. Turkey's experience with secularism as envisioned under Atatürk's reforms created a bridge between the Islamic world and the West (Judeo-Christian). However, these concepts- Islam, Christianity, and Judaism- are complex and subject to shifting political realities.

=== Deterioration of the partnership ===
Controversies
| | United States | Turkey |
| Iraq War | The "hood event" was perceived as an act of U.S. hostility in Turkey. | Turkey denied the U.S. opening of the northern front. |
| Syrian Civil War | Openly communicated with the People's Protection Units (YPG). Armed the YPG. Established an autonomous region. | Turkey accepts YPG as the branch of PKK Performed Operation Olive Branch in 2018 and Operation Peace Spring in 2019 against YPG. Determined to destroy the 'Terror Corridor' (autonomous region) |

U.S. Congressional Research Service (CRS) stated that "Turkey's relative importance for U.S. policymakers declined in the immediate aftermath of the Gulf War and the collapse of the Soviet Union, but focus remained on several regional developments involving Turkey." CGS General Torumtay resigned to prevent Turkey's active engagement to Gulf War (1990). According to CRS, a "reassessment period" was established between 1991 and 2002. CRS timeline for 1991–2002 showed that the U.S. established a "No-Fly Zone" in the north of Iraq. It later withheld military loans to Turkey over alleged human rights violations related to the PKK in 1994. In 1997, the U.S. designated the PKK as a foreign terrorist organization, and the PKK's activities stopped following its leader's capture with U.S. assistance in 1999. In 2003, the Turkish parliament did not allow the U.S. invasion of Iraq from Turkey, and the following year the PKK resumed insurgency and attacks from northern Iraq. (Note: Kurdistan Workers' Party (PKK), an ethnic-separatist group established by Abdullah Öcalan. PKK targeted the Kurdish people in Turkey, Syria, Iraq, and Iran and operated under a Marxist-Leninist left-wing terrorism ideology during the Cold War. Since the PKK was listed as a terrorist organization by the U.S. in 1997 and Öcalan was captured with the CIA's help in 1999, the PKK splintered and unified under Kurdistan Communities Union (KCK). KCK committed to implementing Öcalan's ideology. When the U.S. refers to "Kurdish Allies," it is referring [not to the PKK but to] one or more organizations (YPG, PJAK, etc.) under the KCK. Israel had openly voiced support for these non-PKK groups, like the U.S. The relationship was based on the alliance of the periphery. It targeted non-dominant, non-Arab minority groups such as the Kurdish population to counter or direct opposition to Israel's security challenges. Turkey registers them as unconventional and proxy warfare groups exploiting internal fault lines to weaken Turkey from within by diverting their resources, attention, and stability. Since 1984, more than 40,000 people have lost their lives just in Turkey. The 40-year conflict has cost Turkey's economy an estimated $1.8 trillion to $2 trillion since 1984. History of the Kurdistan Workers' Party showed that it evolved from an anti-imperialist and anti-American movement to eventually serving as an intermediary for U.S. regional objectives.)

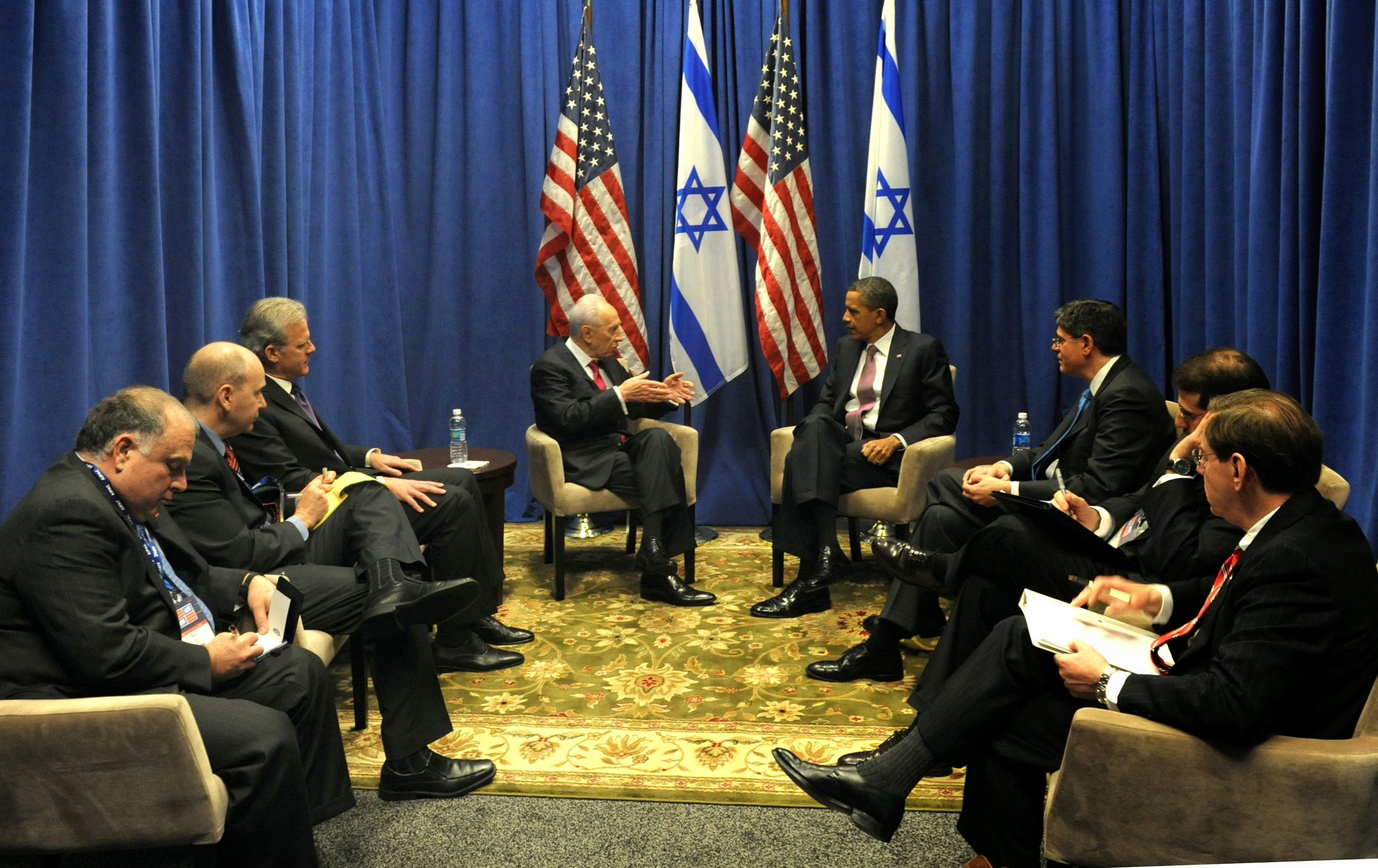
2014: Peres asked Obama for support in Kurdish statehood.

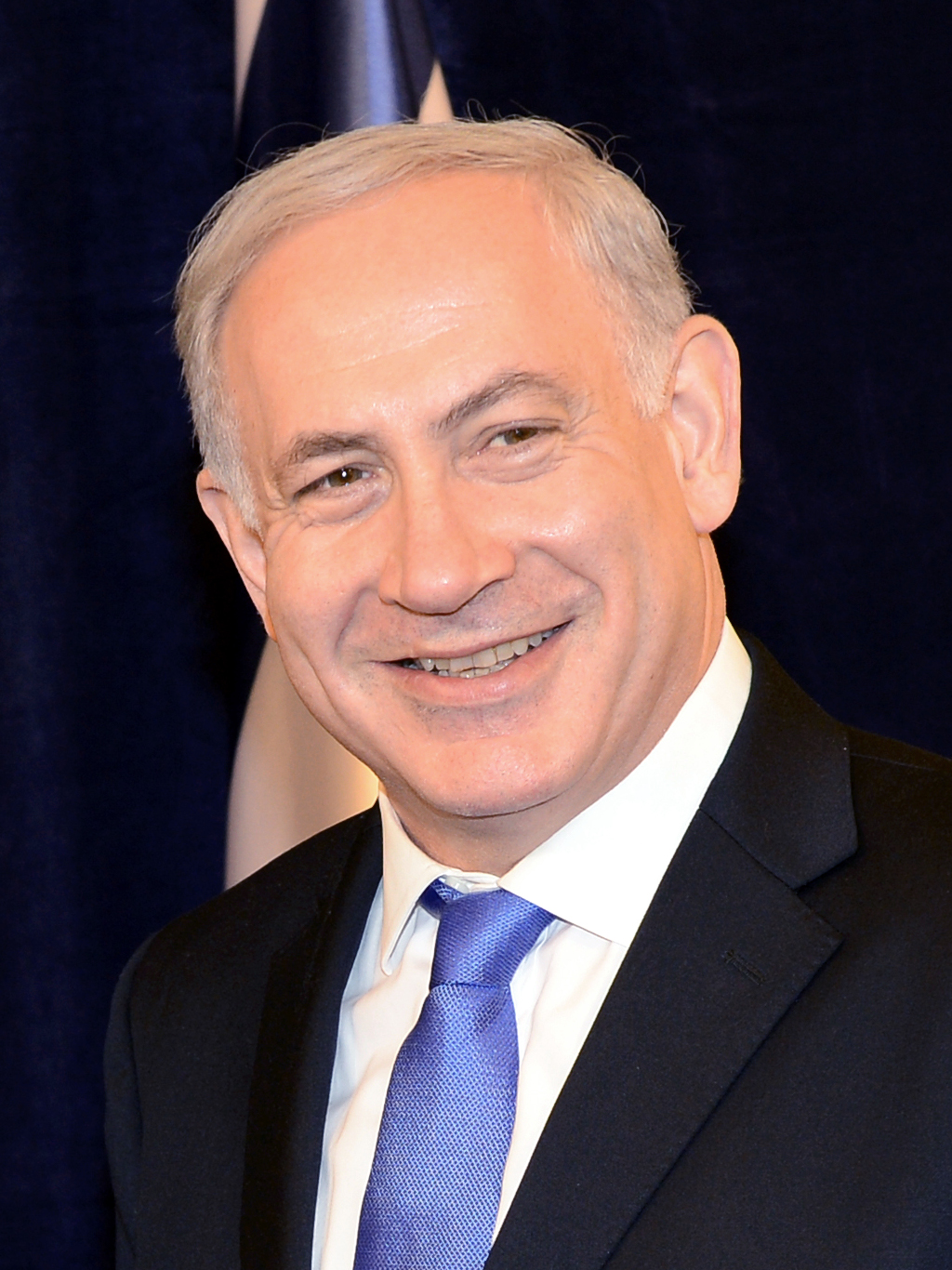
2014: “We should … support the Kurdish aspiration for independence,” Netanyahu to INSS

A breakpoint arose on May 31, 2010, after nine activists were killed during the Gaza flotilla raid. Obama actively engaged to repair relations, saying, "use flotilla tragedy for Mideast peace". Turkey wanted lifting of several restrictions on Gazans, as Erdoğan used the description "this is open-air prison" in 2009 Davos. AIPAC and J Street opposed relief on the blockade, and Turkey faced a unified opposition [bipartisan]. Initially, some neoconservatives have called for Turkey's expulsion from NATO. Later, Tom Rogan from National Review promoted expelling Turkey from NATO as part of his broader efforts to reform the alliance. American libertarians followed them. A senior fellow in defense and foreign policy studies at the Cato Institute, Ted Galen Carpenter, proposed expelling Turkey from the Western alliance. A breakpoint risen in 2015 related to operations in Syria. While claiming Turkey turned a blind eye to ISIL, Turkey–Islamic State conflict, and other jihadist networks on both sides of its border, the U.S. began openly arming the People's Protection Units (YPG), which Turkey recognized as related to the PKK. The U.S.'s open support triggered the 2015 police raids in Turkey. The US-led Operation Inherent Resolve against ISIL began on June 15, 2014, five months before Turkey performed the January 2014 Turkish airstrike in Syria. Another breakpoint arose in 2016. Caused by the belief among most Turkish citizens that America had a hand in the 2016 Turkish coup d'état attempt. It was compounded by the fact that its suspected ringleader, the Islamic preacher Hoca Fethullah Gülen, lives in Saylorsburg, Pennsylvania. Shortly after the FETÖ's (the Gülen movement) purges and arrests (2016–present purges in Turkey), on October 4, 2016, Turkey moved to arrest Turkish nationals employed at American consulates (Metin Topuz on espionage and conspiracy charges), followed on the October 7, 2016, arrest of pastor and teaching elder Evangelical Presbyterian Andrew Brunson. On October 10, 2016, in regards to Ambs. Bass, Turkey declared: "We do not consider the ambassador a representative of the United States," which was a step short of being an unwanted person. The response came on May 16, 2017 McCain and McCaskill called for the expulsion (unwanted person) of the Turkish Amb. Kılıç, following the 2017 clashes at the Turkish Ambassador's Residence in Washington, D.C.

Kurdish Nationalism

With President Obama, we had a mutual agreement about the PKK – but Obama deceived us. I don't believe the Trump administration will do the same.

— Recep Tayyip Erdoğan

Another breakpoint arose in October 2017 following the September 25 2017 Kurdistan Region independence referendum. According to The Economist, Turkish-American relations sank to their lowest level in over 40 years. Turkey moved to establish safe zone (Syria). Turkey performed the Operation Olive Branch (March 25, 2018 – August 9, 2019) against the YPG. Turkey established the Northern Syria Buffer Zone. On August 10, 2018, first Trump tariffs, Trump tweeted that he would double tariffs on Turkish steel and aluminum under the "Section 232," which authorizes tariffs on imports that threaten national security. The Economy of Turkey fell into the Turkish economic crisis (2018–current), driven by both internal structural weaknesses and U.S. sanctions. The Operation Peace Spring established the Second Northern Syria Buffer Zone from October 9 to 17, 2019. Turkey cut off from NATO procurement was followed by the Armenian Genocide bill passed on October 29, 2019. U.S. lost trust in Turkey as the latter bombed its own military base at the Northern Syria Buffer Zone. On February 5, 2020, the U.S. halted a secretive military intelligence cooperation program with Turkey against the PKK. Turkey had observation posts in the Idlib demilitarization (2018–2019) zone which held more than 3,000,000 internally displaced Syrians (more than half of them children). On February 27, 2020, Syrian forces attacked Turkish forces at the Idlib demilitarization zone, and military separation between the forces became public after a senior U.S. State Department official argued with the Pentagon over Turkey's request for two Patriot batteries on its southern border. In 2016, Germany, Italy, and the U.S. already pulled out their units. Turkish Defense Minister Hulusi Akar confirmed the request. On March 4, 2026, the U.S. Navy had to use the more expensive RIM-161 Standard Missile 3 for the first of the 2026 interceptions of Iranian missiles in Turkey over Iran's decision to attack American interests and military bases. The Spanish Patriots were engaged on March 8, 2026; only long-range precision units stayed at Operation Active Fence.

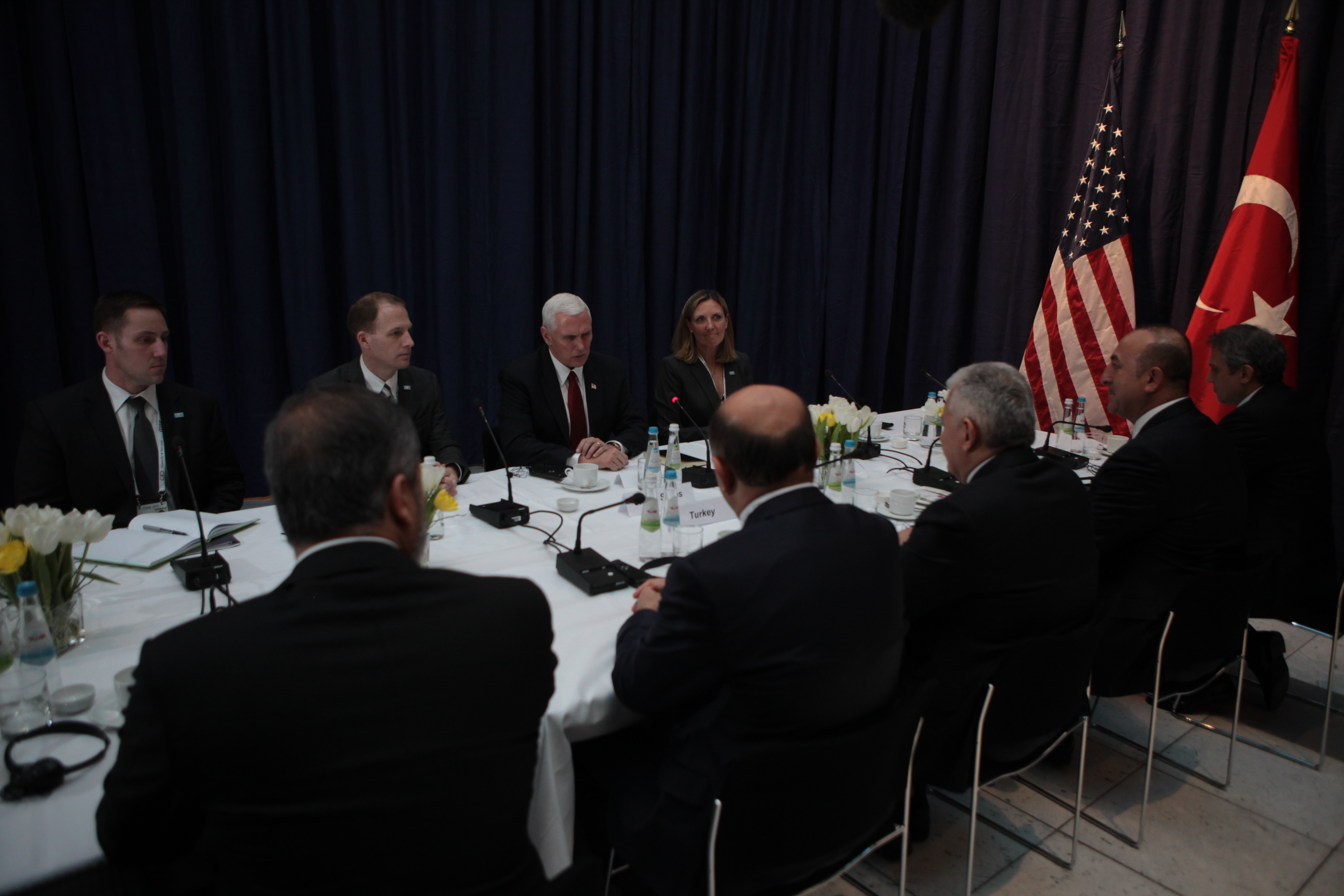
Vice President Mike Pence: "Turkey must choose. Does it want to remain a critical partner in the most successful military alliance in history, or does it want to risk the security of that partnership by making such reckless decisions that undermine our alliance?"
Vice President Fuat Oktay: "The United States must choose. Does it want to remain Turkey's ally or risk our friendship by joining forces with terrorists to undermine its NATO ally's defense against its enemies?"

On October 12, 2023, President Biden declared, "particularly the actions by the Government of Turkey to conduct a military offensive into northeast Syria, undermines the campaign to defeat the Islamic State of Iraq and Syria, or ISIS, endangers civilians, and further threatens to undermine the peace, security, and stability in the region." Following this declaration President Biden reestablished Trump's E.O. 13894 which stated Turkey is an unusual and extraordinary threat to the national security and foreign policy of the United States constituted by the situation in and in relation to Syria. Following the October 1 2023 Ankara bombing, Turkish intelligence officials established that the assailants arrived from Syria by paragliders, where they had been trained. Paragliders were because of the Syria–Turkey barrier. Six days before the declaration, on October 5, Turkey began bombing their facilities in Syria. CJTF–OIR downed a Turkish drone, while doing airstrikes on PKK militants around Hassakeh, which came within 500 m of American troops. A day before the executive order was made public, on October 11, Turkey declared to intensify strikes on the PKK in Iraq and Syria. Turkey showed the same reaction in 2026. Four days before Biden's declaration, on October 7, the Palestinian militant group Hamas used paragliders for the Gaza–Israel barrier to lead an attack on Israel. Since October 7, the Netanyahu government has taken on the mission to create regional conflicts, which he called a campaign to weaken Iran and its network of armed groups. When the 2026 Iran war began, Turkey once again moved to block a U.S.–Israeli-backed scheme to deploy the Kurdistan Free Life Party PJAK to destabilize the Iranian government. Turkey considers PJACK a PKK-affiliated organization. "Kurds are not 'guns for hire, we're diplomats'" was stated by the Deputy Prime Minister of the Kurdistan Regional Government.

It is evident that the Turks do not want to be sidelined by the US or the West when it comes to their own national security concerns. Neither do they want to be hamstrung by easily severed logistics. Clearly, they want to be, and have been thinking about becoming, important players in regional politics, and their public national security policy says as much. They have become involved in multinational military interventions at every opportunity. They have shown a willingness to defy the US. They have industrial and procurement plans aimed at strategic autonomy.

=== Single to Multi-Polar International System ===
U.S. Middle East Partners
| | Israel | Turkey |
| Alignment | Special relationship | Neither Friend (not submissive) nor Foe (not hostile) |
| Aims | Increasingly unchallenged military and strategic dominance. | Integrating through multilateral consensus. |
| Goals | To replace Russian dominance (NS1, NS2) in EU through Energy Triangle and EastMed pipeline. | To become an energy transit & trading hub, the Arab Gas Pipeline. |
| Strategy | A preeminent military power originated from a small defensive force.; Overwhelming hard power and military reach.; Nuclear Monopoly. | Broad normative leadership (e.g., voice to Palestinian suffering, support to Syrian refugees).; Cultural attraction (brotherhood with Muslims).; Voluntary buy-in (e.g., Iraq–Europe Development Road). |
| Alliances | "3+1" grouping (Israel, Greece, Cyprus + U.S.); Abraham Accords | Mecca Defence Alliance |

Degradation of the security structure. The 2010s were a period of deterioration. This extended to the NATO controversy. In 2019, the U.S. cut off NATO's second-largest military from NATO procurement. Other NATO members followed with separate export and defense-industry restrictions. Since the cut off neither the Biden-Turkey, nor the 2nd Trump-Turkey, did reverse that decision. Turkey wanted F-16 modernization and a return to F-35 production. NATO worked on interoperability and standardization (STANAGs). Continuous modernization of NATO military partners is critical. The U.S. sanctions prevented TAF from acquiring/developing parts, supplies, and NATO-aligned systems. Seven years later, in 2026, Turkey was still asking NATO allies to lift restrictions. Without an access to F-35 or modernization of F16, Turkish military industrial complex shifted to high gear in endogenous development. Major fratricide incidents between forces occurred, such as the Hood event under the command of Odierno and the 2023 Turkish drone shootdown. In November 2017, NATO used a picture of Mustafa Kemal Atatürk to depict an "enemy leader" in a simulation chart. As the U.S. defense umbrella in question, the military budget of Turkey constantly increased. It rose 30% year over year during the period, and equipment procurement was slated to jump by 229% in 2027.

New U.S. regional alignment. The gas fields Tamar, Leviathan, and Aphrodite; found in 2009, 2010, and 2011 respectively. Beginning in 2014, the U.S. developed agreements in response to new security challenges in the eastern Mediterranean Sea, "Energy Triangle." The 2010s were a period of deterioration for the U.S.-Turkey relationship. In 2018, the Council on Foreign Relations (CFR), aligned with pro-Israel strategic interests, recommended that "the U.S. needs to develop alternatives to Incirlik Air Base, as the use of the base to advance U.S. interests is no longer assured." CFR stated, "the U.S. needs to adjust its expectations, ask for less, and develop other options because, despite being a NATO ally, Turkey's interests do not fully align with the U.S. on all regional or global issues. SecState Pompeo established the "3+1" grouping (Israel, Greece, Cyprus + U.S.). The "3+1" grouping centered on the proposed EastMed pipeline, adding a new dimension based on energy, defense, and containment. Trump administration advanced US-Greece cooperation by signing the "Revised Defense Cooperation Agreement" in 2019. In 2021, the "Greek-American Mutual Defense Cooperation Agreement" permitted the U.S. military to use more bases. In a few short years, Turkey saw NATO powers shift toward its western neighbor. Anadolu Agency reported growing US military presence in Greece can lead to undesired scenarios in the Aegean ‘Deploying more US troops to Greece would disrupt NATO's powers,’ SecState Blinken reversed the long-standing policy on the Cyprus dispute by signing a defense deal that lifted the arms embargo. In 2021, Biden, citing Turkey's dispensability, emphasized U.S. relations with Armenia. In 2023, American Enterprise Institute scholar Rubin stated that Biden needs to act to block Zangezur corridor On the east of Turkey: Biden started talks with Armenia to establish a military base in the Zangezur corridor. It became Trump Route for International Peace and Prosperity (2025) through Armenia–Azerbaijan peace agreement.

On August 17, 2026, Abu al-Duhur airport bombing targeted Turkish forces during the period when a Turkish court had an arrest warrant for Netanyahu. In the first quarter of the 21st century, Israel's strategic security needs obliged Turkey to develop a regional reordering in Mecca, "multi-alignment".

== History ==
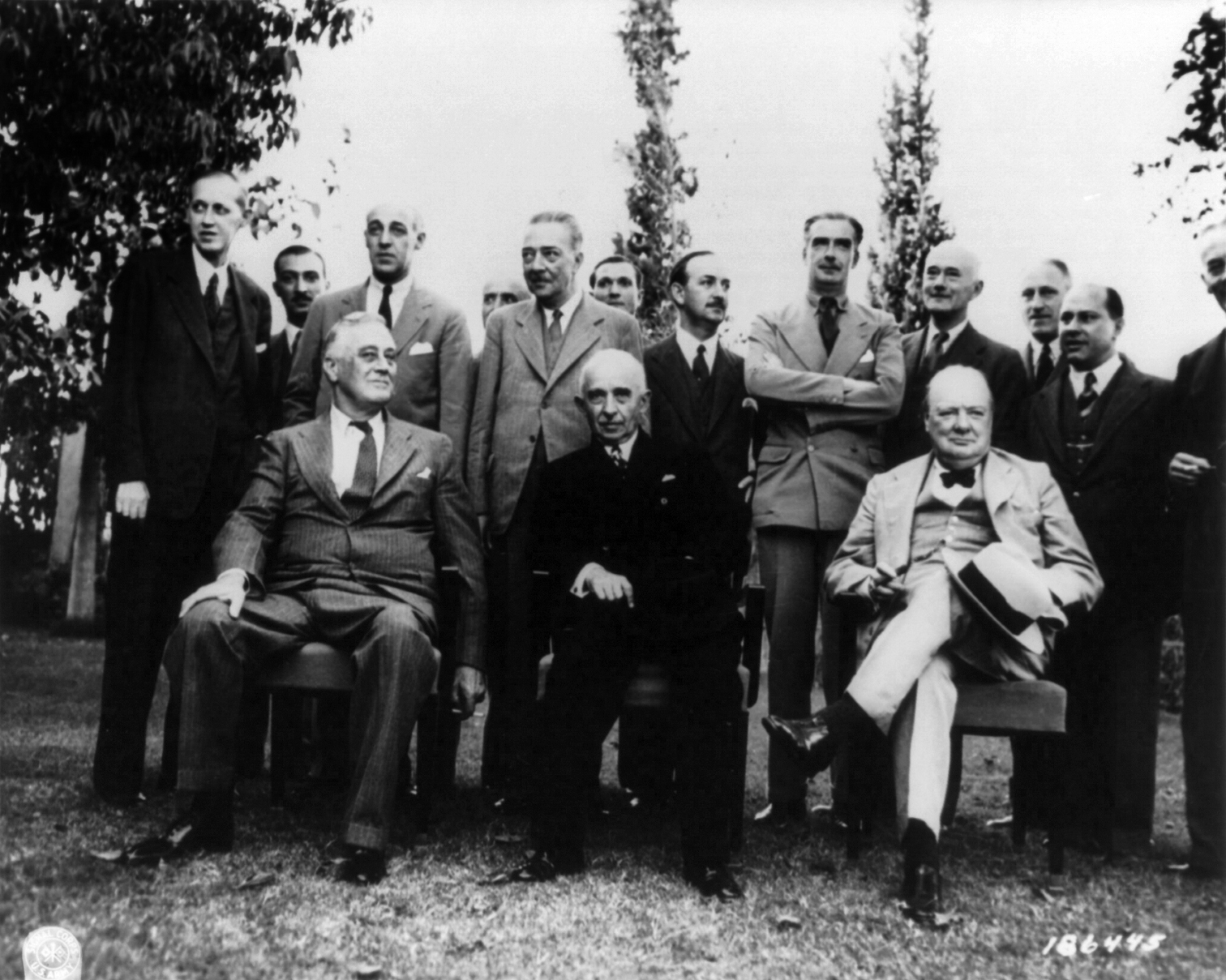
1943: Roosevelt, İnönü and Churchill at the Second Cairo Conference during World War II.

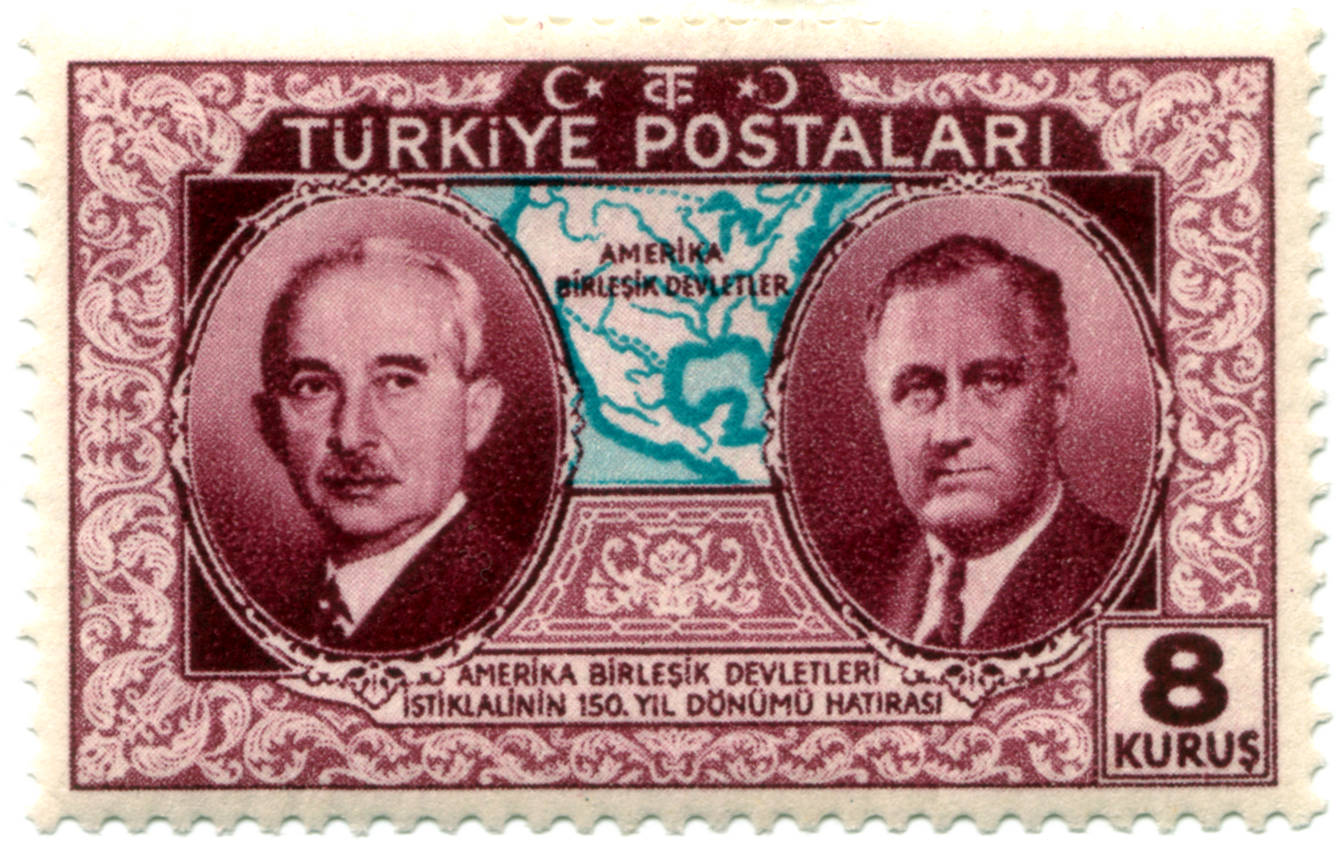
A Turkish stamp for the 150th anniversary of American Independence, with İnönü, and Roosevelt.

=== Truman administration (1945–1953) ===
Turkey's most important international relationship has been with the United States since the end of the Second World War and the beginning of the Cold War.

==== Soviet Union (Straits crisis, Truman Doctrine, Korean War, NATO) ====
Honoring an Ambassador

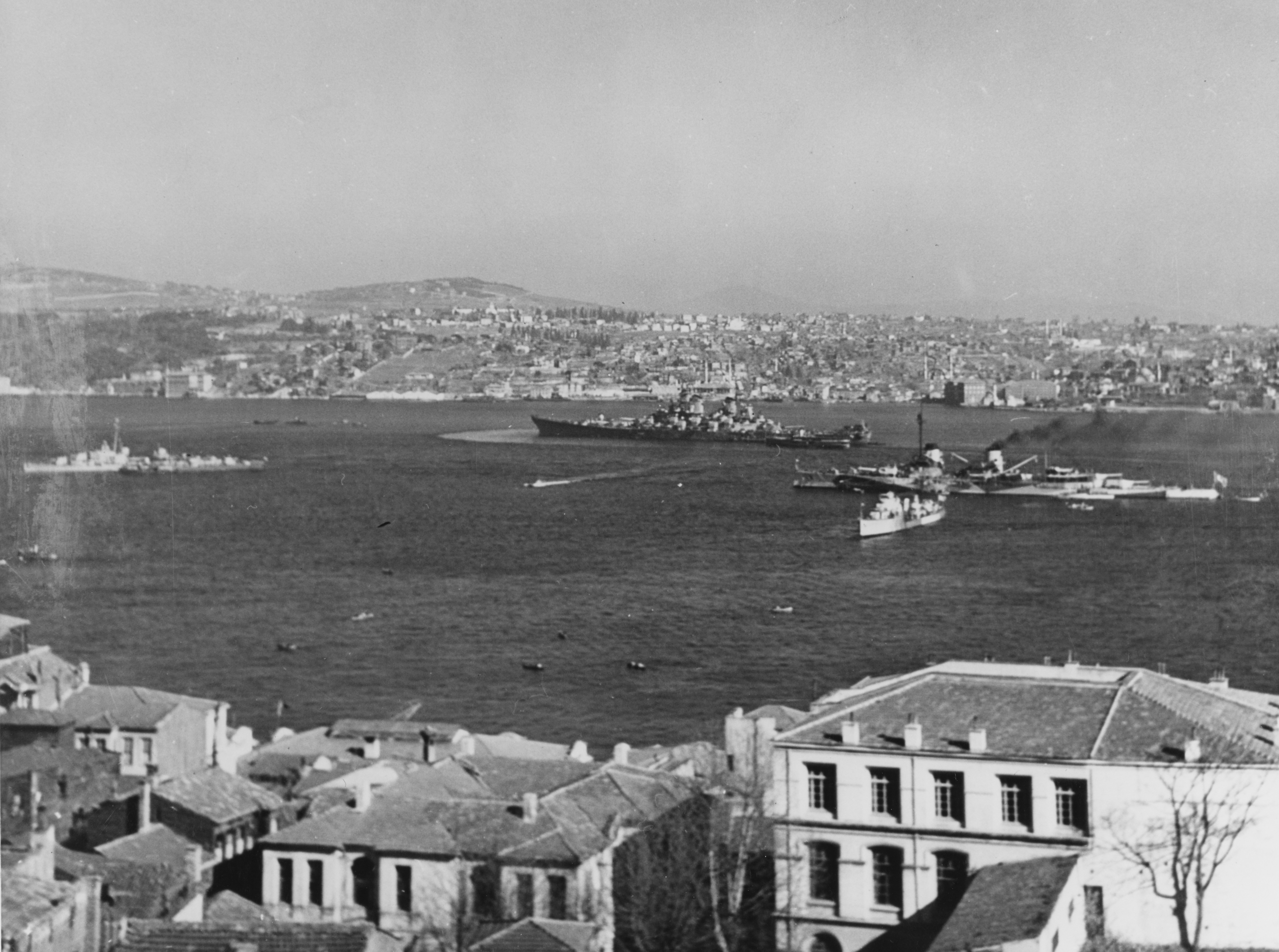
1946: USS Missouri "taking Ertegün back to his homeland" and TCG Yavuz escorting

In 1945, the Turkish Straits crisis developed over the request for Russian military bases in the Turkish Straits as part of Soviet territorial claims against Turkey. After World War II, the Soviet government pressured Turkey to allow Russian shipping to pass freely through the Turkish Straits. Tensions in the region prompted the Soviets to display naval force after Turkey refused to comply with the Soviet Union's requests.

In 1946, President Truman returned the body of Münir Ertegün, former Turkish Ambassador to Washington (2nd Ambassador of Turkey to the United States), back to Istanbul with the battleship Missouri. Missouri, with her 1,515 officers and enlisted men, honored the deceased between March 21, 1946, in Washington, and April 5, in Istanbul, until his body was given to his family. It was a gesture not only to Turkish foreign service but also to demonstrate that the US was defending Turkey against Soviet threats.

Truman Doctrine

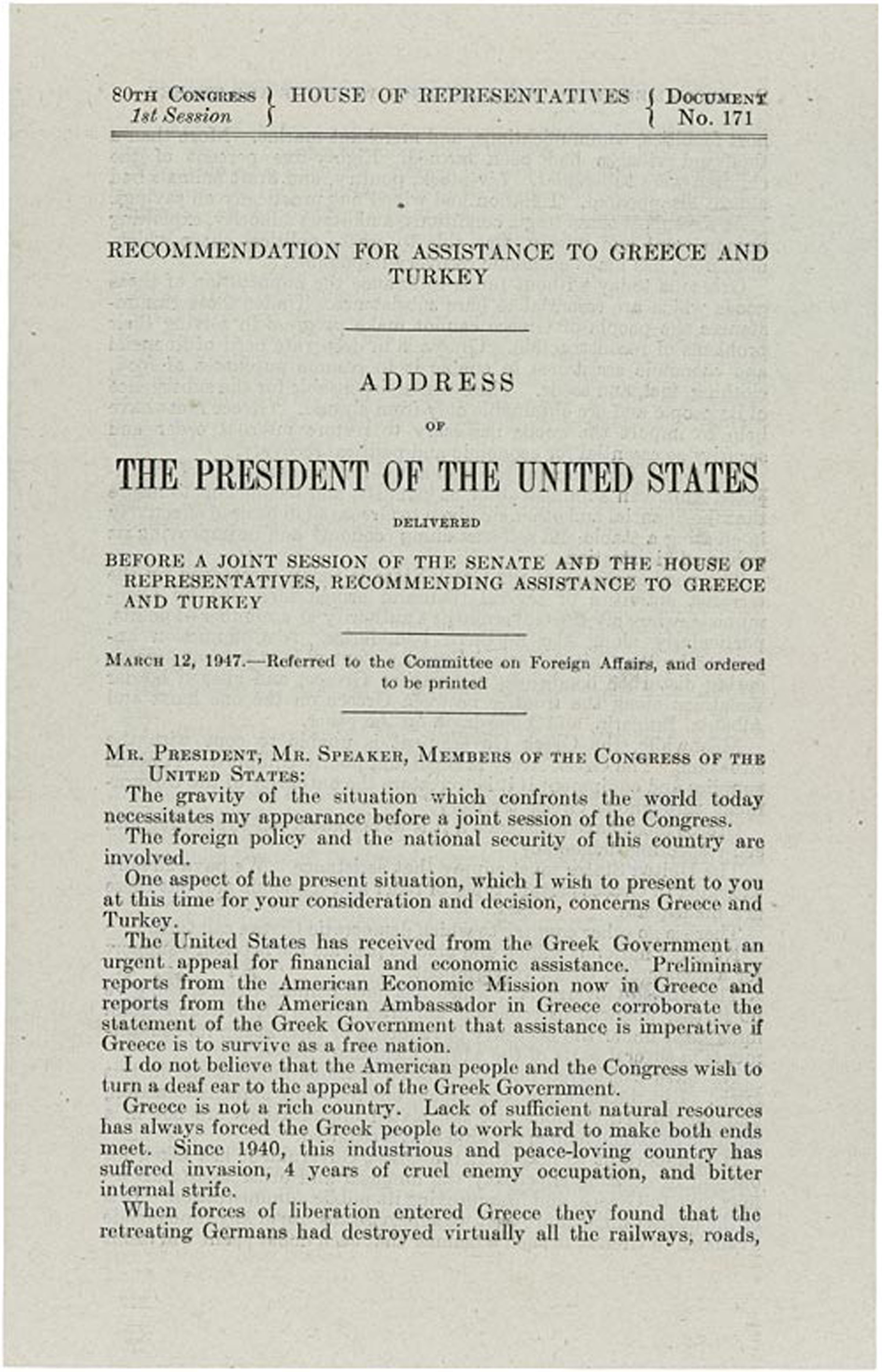
1947: Recommendation for assistance

1948: Situation Report

1949: Politics, economy & industry

1952: Politics, economy & industry

In 1947, Britain ended its assistance to Turkey. The U.S. dispatched military aid to ensure Turkey retained primary control of the passage. Turkey began to associate with the United States in 1947 when the United States Congress designated Turkey, under the provisions of the "Truman Doctrine", as the recipient of special economic and military assistance intended to help it resist threats from the Soviet Union.

The Truman Doctrine was an American foreign policy that sought to counter Soviet geopolitical expansion during the Cold War. The Truman Doctrine prioritized adherence to democracy as a strategic goal. Truman used the advancement of liberal Democracy to secure congressional aid for Turkey. Truman's strategic imperatives and democratic rhetoric against communist ideology held that, with US assistance against the Soviets, Turkey moved away from a single-party system toward a multi-party system. There is no causal link between Turkey's democratization and either the Truman Doctrine or Turkey's admission to the North Atlantic Treaty Organization (NATO). In Atatürk's Reforms, Mustafa Kemal Atatürk envisioned a multi-party-based system. However, Turkey was a "de facto single-party state" (the correct term is one-party period of the Republic of Turkey) as the Republican People's Party effectively prevented the opposition from winning elections. Turkey held the first multi-party elections in 1946. Multi-party period of the Republic of Turkey began with the Democratic Party government of Adnan Menderes.

At the start of the Korean War, the U.S. pursued the containment strategy to defend Republic of Korea (ROK) from a communist invasion by Democratic People's Republic of Korea (DPRK). In support of the US' overall Cold War strategy, Turkey contributed to the United Nations forces in the Korean War (1950–53). On October 19, 1950, with more than 4,500 troops, the Turkish Brigade was attached to the U.S. 25th Infantry Division. The Turkish Brigade was the only foreign unit of its size permanently attached to a U.S. division (Brothers in Arms). Turkey replaced/replenished this Brigade each year (15,000 combat soldiers and a total of 21,212) until mid-summer of 1954. A mutual interest in containing Soviet expansion provided the foundation of US–Turkish relations for the next four decades.

Containment: US and Turkey at Korean War

Dec 1–2, 1950: Row footage. Turkish Brigade supported by 1st Cavalry at Sunchon

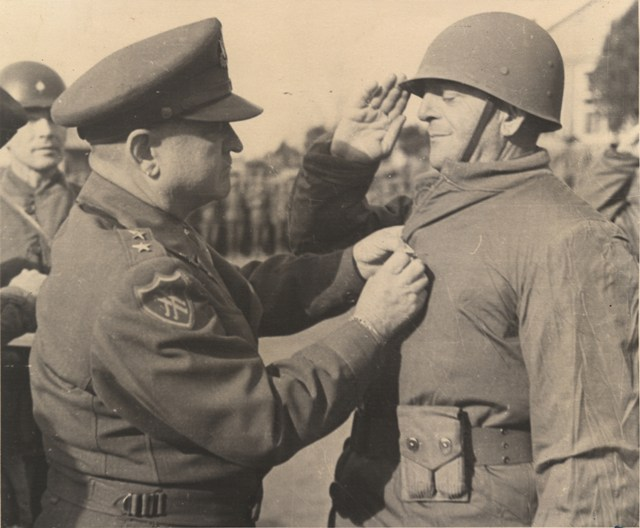
December 15, 1950: Brigade General Yazıcı receiving Silver Star from Lieutenant General Walker

After extensive study and debate over extending the alliance to the eastern Mediterranean, NATO finalized the admission of Greece and Turkey on February 18, 1952. The membership of these two countries created NATO's new southern flank. The treaty's wording needed changes to expand its territorial reach. Turkey's admission to NATO gave NATO a much longer land border with the Warsaw Pact. The 1936 Montreux Convention Regarding the Regime of the Straits gave Turkey control over the Turkish Straits, through which the Soviet Navy's Black Sea Fleet had access to the Mediterranean. At the same time, Turkey brought the alliance its second-largest military workforce after the United States, along with access to sites for forward deployment and intelligence gathering.

==== Marshall Plan (economic recovery & industrial modernization) ====
Marshall Plan

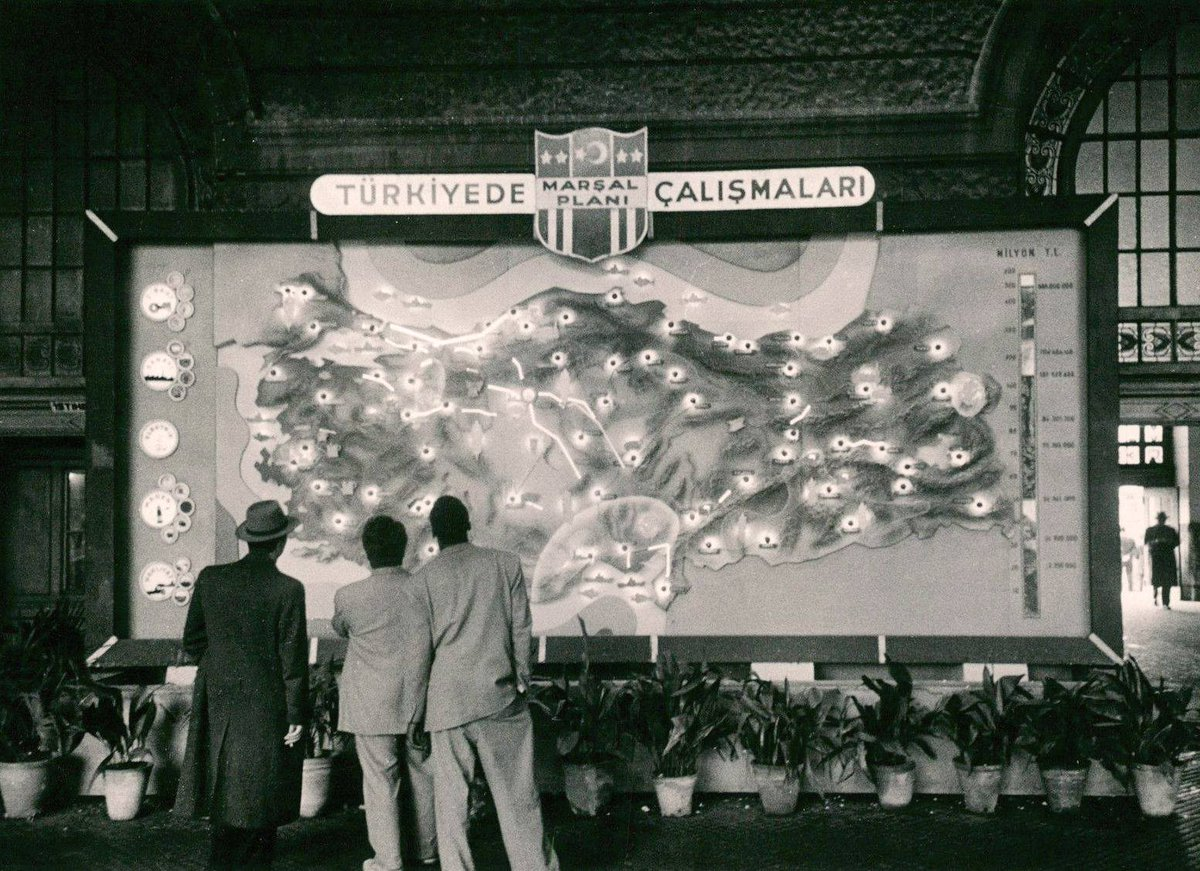
Informational panel about the Marshall Plan displayed at Haydarpaşa Station, 1951

Agricultural support to Turkey

Since Atatürk's Reforms, Turkey has sought to join the Western alliance. Turkey also intended to enter into the Western economic structure. The Truman Doctrine aimed to prevent the spread of communism in Turkey. It aimed to change Turkey's isolated economy (statist structure) to move into a liberal system. Marshall subsidies created economic added value in Turkey. The Marshal Plan also directed Turkey toward higher military spending (the second-largest military in NATO) because it was seen mainly as a buffer state against the Soviet Union and the Middle East.

Turkey received $111 million in economic and military aid, and the U.S. sent the aircraft carrier Franklin D. Roosevelt. The Marshall Plan intended to direct Turkey towards developments in the agriculture, mining, and tourism sectors. Tractors and other agricultural equipment entered the country, sparking a production boom. Aid to the Turkish military flowed back to the US military-industrial complex. .

=== Eisenhower administration (1953–1961) ===
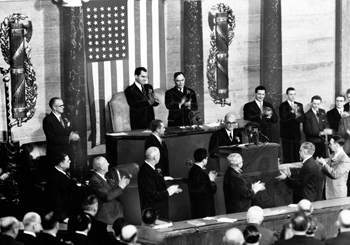
1954:President Celal Bayar receives a standing ovation after his speech before a joint session of Congress. Behind him are Vice-President Nixon and Speaker of the House Rayburn

1959: President Eisenhower meeting PM Menderes

==== Soviet Union (NATO, CENTO, U-2 incident) ====
Turkey was a founding member of the Central Treaty Organization (CENTO) collective defense pact established in 1955, and endorsed the principles of the 1957 Eisenhower Doctrine. In the 1950s and 1960s, Turkey generally cooperated with other United States allies in the Middle East (Iran, Israel, and Jordan) to contain the influence of countries (Egypt, Iraq, and Syria) regarded as Soviet clients. Throughout the Cold War, Turkey was the bulwark of NATO's southeastern flank and directly bordered Warsaw Pact countries.

1960 U-2 incident was a U-2 spy plane shot down by the Soviet Air Defence Forces while performing photographic aerial reconnaissance deep into Soviet territory. On April 28, 1960, a U.S. Lockheed U-2C spy plane, Article 358, was ferried from Incirlik Air Base in Turkey to the US base at Peshawar Airport by pilot Glen Dunaway. Fuel for the aircraft had been ferried to Peshawar the previous day in a US Air Force C-124 transport. A US Air Force C-130 followed, which carried the ground crew, mission pilot Francis Powers, and backup pilot Bob Ericson. On the morning of April 29, the crew in Badaber learned the mission had been delayed by one day. As a result, Bob Ericson flew Article 358 back to Incirlik, and John Shinn ferried another U-2C, Article 360, from Incirlik to Peshawar. On April 30, the mission was delayed one more day due to bad weather over the Soviet Union. On May 1, Captain Powers left the base in Peshawar on a mission with the operation code word GRAND SLAM. Four days after Powers' disappearance, NASA issued a very detailed press release noting that an aircraft had "gone missing" north of Turkey.

On May 13, the Soviet Union sent complaints to Turkey, which in turn protested to the United States. Turkey received assurances that no U.S. aircraft would be used for unauthorized purposes.

=== Kennedy and Johnson administrations (1961–1969) ===
==== Soviet Union (Missile Crisis) ====
Nuclear umbrella

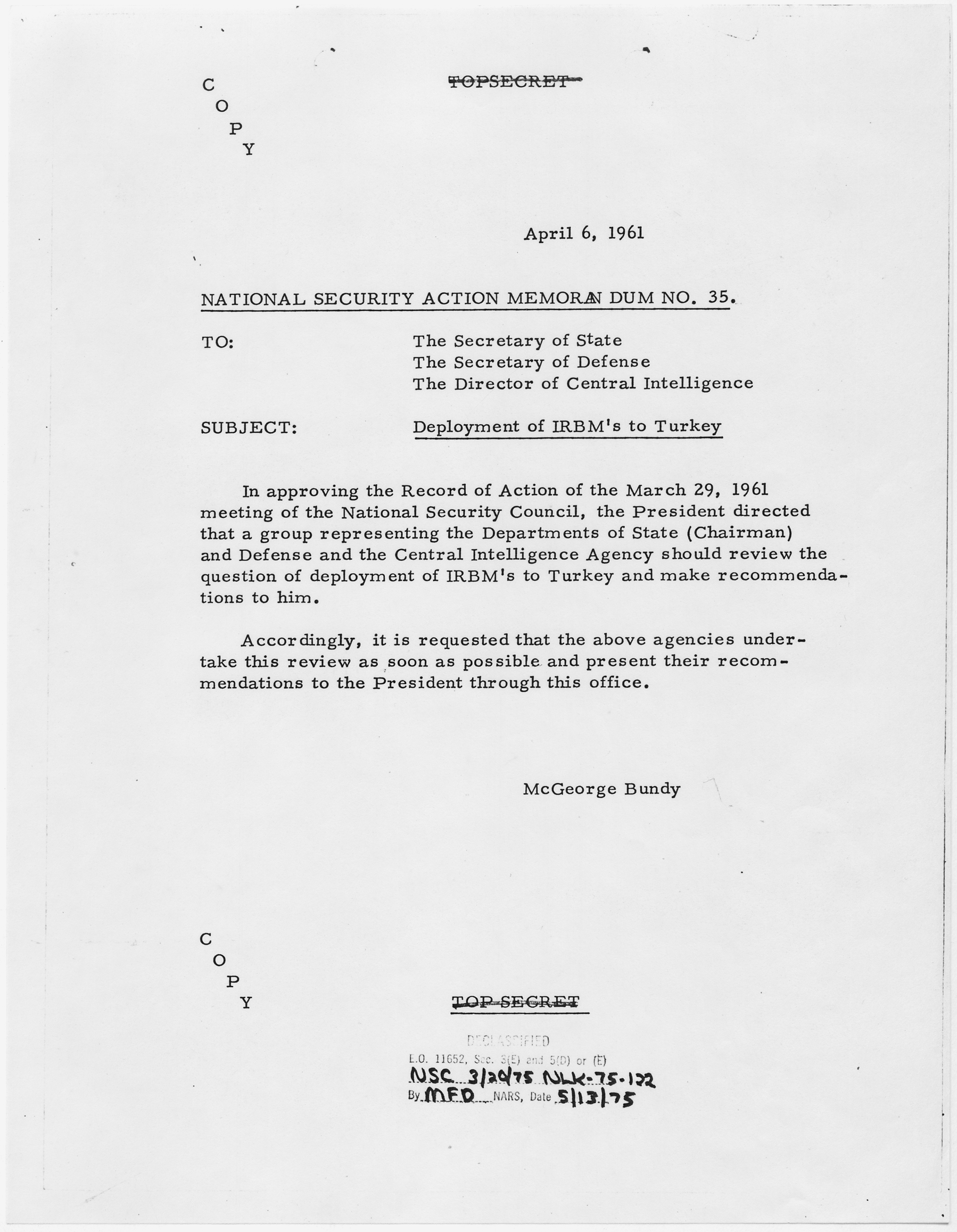
1961- IRBMs to Turkey

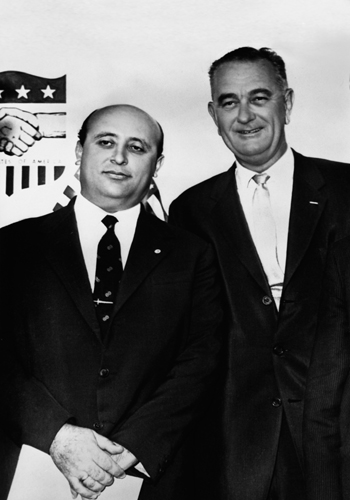
1962: VP Johnson and EB of the Justice Party Demirel

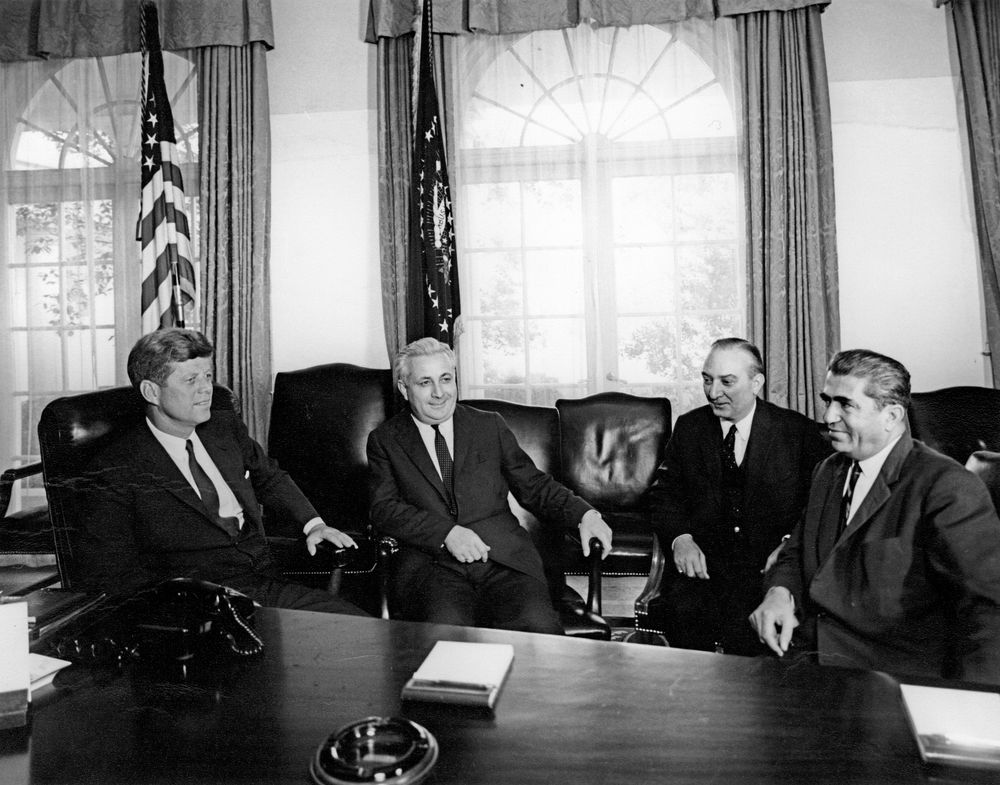
1963: President Kennedy with TM Ferit Melen & Deputy PM Ekrem Alican

Turkey risked nuclear war on its soil during the Cuban Missile Crisis. It was a 13-day confrontation between the United States and the Soviet Union initiated by the American discovery of Soviet ballistic missile deployment in Cuba. In response to the failed Bay of Pigs Invasion of 1961 and the presence of American Jupiter ballistic missiles in Italy and Turkey, Soviet leader Nikita Khrushchev agreed to Cuba's request to place nuclear missiles on the island to deter a future invasion. John F. Kennedy and Khrushchev reached an agreement. Publicly, the Soviets would dismantle their offensive weapons in Cuba, in exchange for a US public declaration and agreement to avoid invading Cuba again. Secretly, the United States agreed to dismantle all US-built Jupiter MRBMs that had been deployed in Turkey and Italy against the Soviet Union.

In 2017, The Putin Interviews claimed that the placement of Russian missiles in Cuba was a Russian reaction to the earlier stationing of American missiles in Turkey in 1961–62; Khrushchev attempted to achieve a balance of power.

==== Greece (Cyprus, Johnson letter) ====
1963: President Kennedy addressing the Turkish people on Atatürk on the Republic Day

The Cyprus Emergency was a conflict fought in British Cyprus between 1955 and 1959. The National Organization of Cypriot Fighters (EOKA), a Greek Cypriot right-wing nationalist guerrilla organization, began an armed campaign in support of ending British colonial rule and enabling the unification of Cyprus and Greece (Enosis) in 1955. Opposition to Enosis among Turkish Cypriots led to the formation of the Turkish Resistance Organization (TMT) in support of the partition of Cyprus, and in the mid-1960s relations between Greek and Turkish communities on Cyprus worsened. Britain wanted to hand the crisis and a peacekeeping role to either NATO or UN forces. US President Lyndon B. Johnson tried to prevent a Turkish invasion of Cyprus and war between them. American diplomat George Ball found Archbishop Makarios, president of Cyprus, difficult to deal with, as he commonly rejected the advice.

The Americans secretly talked to General Georgios Grivas, leader of the EOKA guerrilla organization. While invasion and war did not occur, the U.S. alienated both the Greek and Turkish governments and drove Makarios closer to the Russians and Egyptians. The Cyprus Emergency ended in 1959 with the signing of the London-Zürich Agreements, establishing the Republic of Cyprus as a non-partitioned independent state separate from Greece.

On June 5, 1964, President LBJ sent a letter to Turkish Premier İsmet İnönü, known as the "Johnson letter." The most important point was that NATO would be reluctant to defend Turkey.

Washington, June 5, 1964, 12:15 a.m.

Dear Mr Prime Minister:
I am gravely concerned by the information which I have had through Ambassador Hare from you and your Foreign Minister that the Turkish Government is contemplating a decision to intervene by military force to occupy a portion of Cyprus. I wish to emphasize, in the fullest friendship and frankness, that I do not consider that such a course of action by Turkey, fraught with such far-reaching consequences, is consistent with the commitment of your Government to consult fully in advance with us. ... (1)NATO Allies have not had a chance to consider whether they have an obligation to protect Turkey. ... (2) your Government is required to obtain United States consent for the use of military assistance for purposes other than those for which such assistance was furnished. ... I do feel that you and I carry a very heavy responsibility for the general peace and for the possibilities of a sane and peaceful resolution of the Cyprus problem. I ask you, therefore, to delay any decisions which you and your colleagues might have in mind until you and I have had the fullest and frankest consultation.

Sincerely, Lyndon B. Johnson

— Lyndon B. Johnson, President Johnson's letter to Prime Minister Inonu, The letter was released by the White House in January 1966 and printed in Middle East Journal 20 (1966), pp. 386–393.

Item 1 was the critical American position toward Turkey. Item 2 was the wake-up call. Johnson revealed to Turkey's political elite that the TAF overly depended on the US. Inonu knew that he would receive a strong message. The letter leaked to the press before the messenger left the building. Inonu created a reference point for the nature and intention of American policy on Turkey. In the following decades, Johnson's Letter became the first-level reference when an American policy regarding Turkey was analyzed. The unintended consequence of the Johnson Letter showed in the public debates. What would American assistance look like if the US wanted to defend Turkey?

The US ordered the Sixth Fleet to Istanbul in August 1968. The Turkish public perceived the visit as a follow-up to the Johnson letter. Labor federations and other left-wing groups protested the fleet. Those were the same groups that presented a heartfelt welcome in the late 1950s.

=== Nixon and Ford administrations (1969–1977) ===
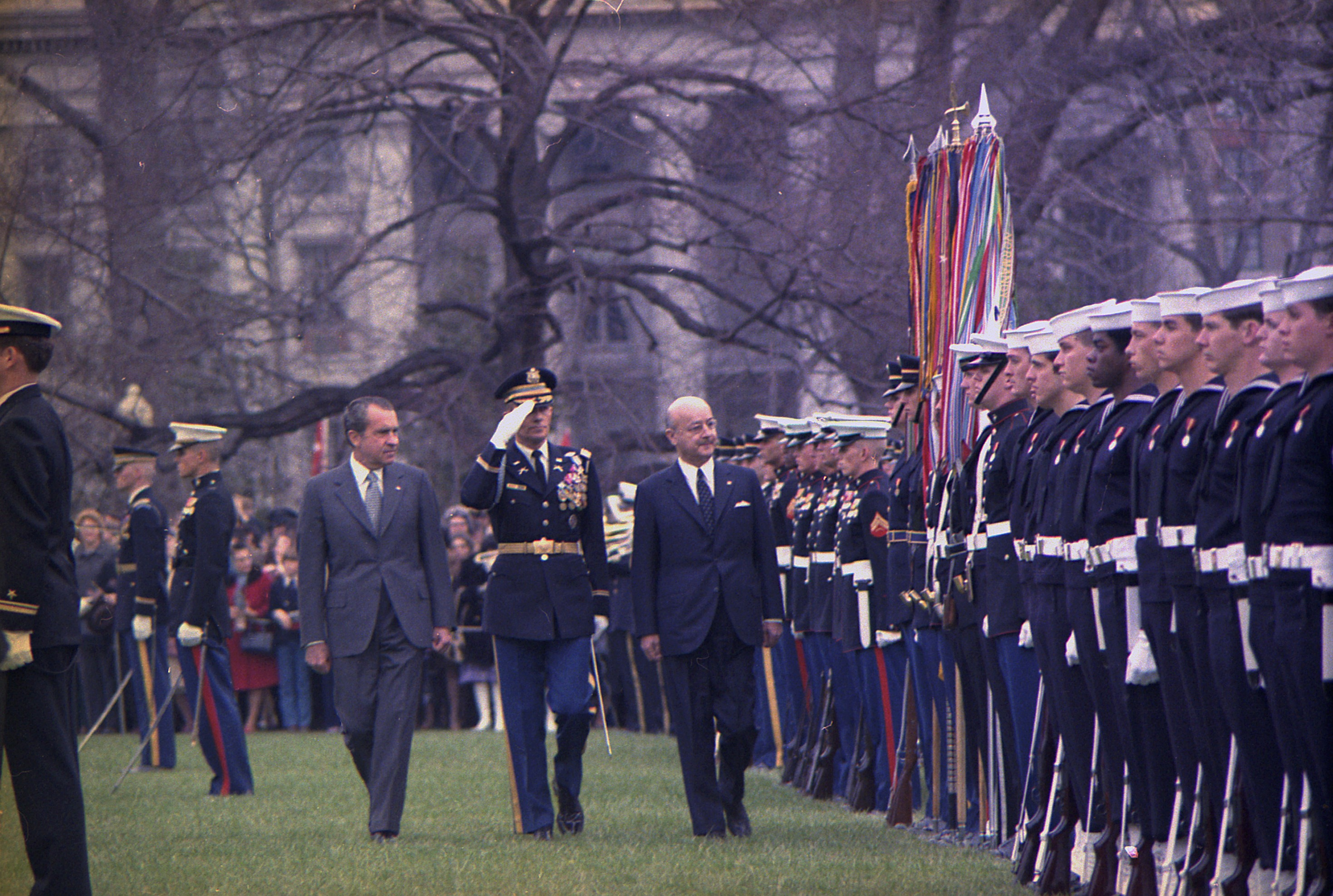
Richard Nixon and Nihat Erim

==== War on drugs ====
The war on drugs is the policy of a global campaign to reduce the illegal drug trade in the United States. In controlling the illegal drug trade in Turkey, the government signed the Single Convention on Narcotic Drugs in 1961, and the parliament ratified it in 1967. In 1971, Turkey imposed a ban on opium production as a result of considerable U.S. government pressure. The U.S. provided $35.7 million to support the transition of 70,000 farm workers to cultivating other crops. The Turkish government implemented the program under pressure from farmers who claimed lost revenue. Nationalists claimed the program was imposed under foreign pressure. During the 1973 Turkish general election, all political parties expressed dissatisfaction with the campaign. In 1974, Turkey moved to a system for licensing poppy production in which the state purchased all crops (no poppy market) and used them for the legal production of pharmaceuticals by state-owned institutions (no sale to private industry).

==== Greece (Cyprus, Arms embargo) ====
Turkey and Greece

1975: Ford & Prime Minister Demirel

1976: Ford & Foreign Minister Caglayangil

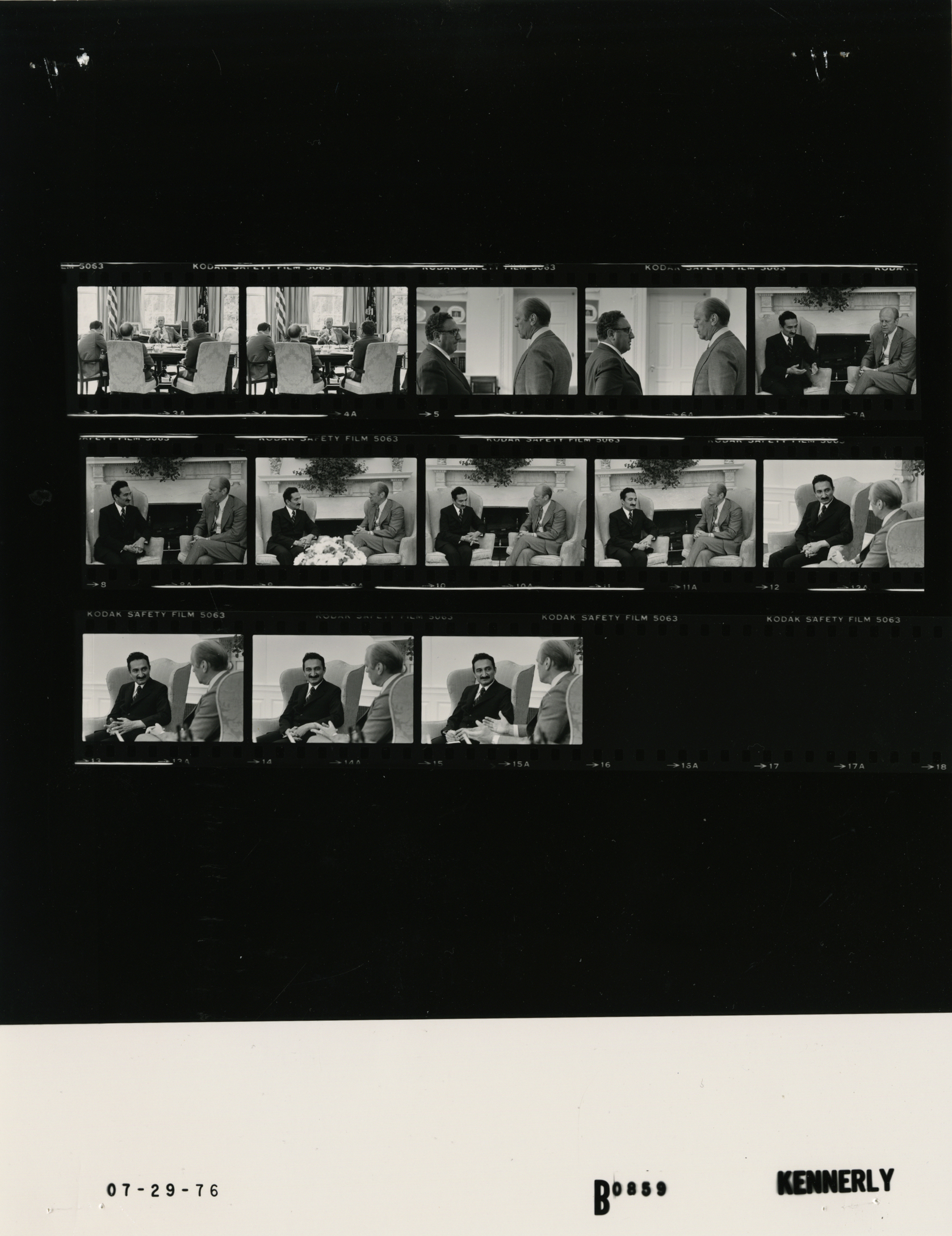
1976: Ford & Prime Minister Ecevit

1976 Ford on the New York assassination attempt on Ecevit. Ecevit on the Cyprus problem.

After the 1974 Cypriot coup d'état (backed by the Cypriot National Guard and the Greek military junta), on July 20, 1974, Turkey invaded Cyprus, claiming it was protecting the safety of Turkish Cypriots following the Treaty of Guarantee. The Turkish military occupied the northern third of Cyprus (Turkish invasion of Cyprus), dividing the island along what became known as the Green Line monitored by the United Nations, defying the ceasefire.

Turkey repeatedly claimed, for decades before the invasion and frequently afterward, that Cyprus was of vital strategic importance to it. Ankara defied a host of UN resolutions demanding the withdrawal of its occupying troops from the island. About 142,000 Greek Cypriots living in the north and 65,000 Turkish Cypriots living in the south were forcibly expelled and were forbidden to return to their homes and properties. 109 Turkish villages were destroyed, and 700 Turks were kept as hostages. Daily Telegraph described events as an anti-Turkish pogrom.

The United States imposed an arms embargo on Turkey in response, and relations between the two countries suffered significantly. The US could not achieve its desired goal by imposing an embargo on Turkey. However, it caused Turkey to invest in its defense industry. Soviets saw the expansion of Warsaw Pact could have a chance in the region.

==== Soviet Union (Cold War) ====
In 1969, Ambs. Komer's car was set on fire by the Marxist-Leninist Dev-Genç during his visit of Mustafa Kemal Kurdaş at the Middle East Technical University. The nascent institution was developed using the aid given by the United States. Former CIA counterintelligence officer Aldrich Ames decoded the organization as a part of the CIA activities in Turkey.

In the coming years, Turkey became a front for the clashes between far-left and far-right militant groups, as the political violence in Turkey (1976–1980) took place simultaneously with the worldwide incidents of left-wing terrorism aimed at overthrowing the liberal and capitalist governments and replacing them with communist or socialist regimes.

NATO support manifested in the establishment of a clandestine stay-behind army, called the "Counter-Guerrilla", under Operation Gladio.

==== Armenia (Terrorist attacks) ====
The Armenian Secret Army for the Liberation of Armenia (ASALA), listed as a terrorist organization by the United States Department of State, carried out attacks against Turkish diplomats and Turkish Airlines offices between 1975 and 1991. The precursor to the foundation of ASALA was the assassination of Turkish Consul General Mehmet Baydar and Turkish Consul Bahadır Demir by Armenian American Kourken Yanigian, who invited them to a luncheon on January 27, 1973, in Santa Barbara, California, United States. Yanigian was sentenced to life imprisonment, but many Armenian Americans expressed support for his views. Numerous attacks by ASALA were carried out in the United States, Europe, and the Middle East.

=== Carter administration (1977–1981) ===
The geopolitical changes in the Middle East, like the Iranian Revolution, force the arms embargo was silently removed a few years later with the contribution of the National Security Advisor Zbigniew Brzezinski discussed with his staff a possible American invasion of Iran by using Turkish bases and territory if the Soviets decided to repeat the Afghanistan scenario in Iran, although this plan did not materialize.

=== Reagan administration (1981–1989) ===
1985: Reagan meeting PM Ozal

1988: Reagan meeting PM Ozal

1988: Reagan meeting President Evren

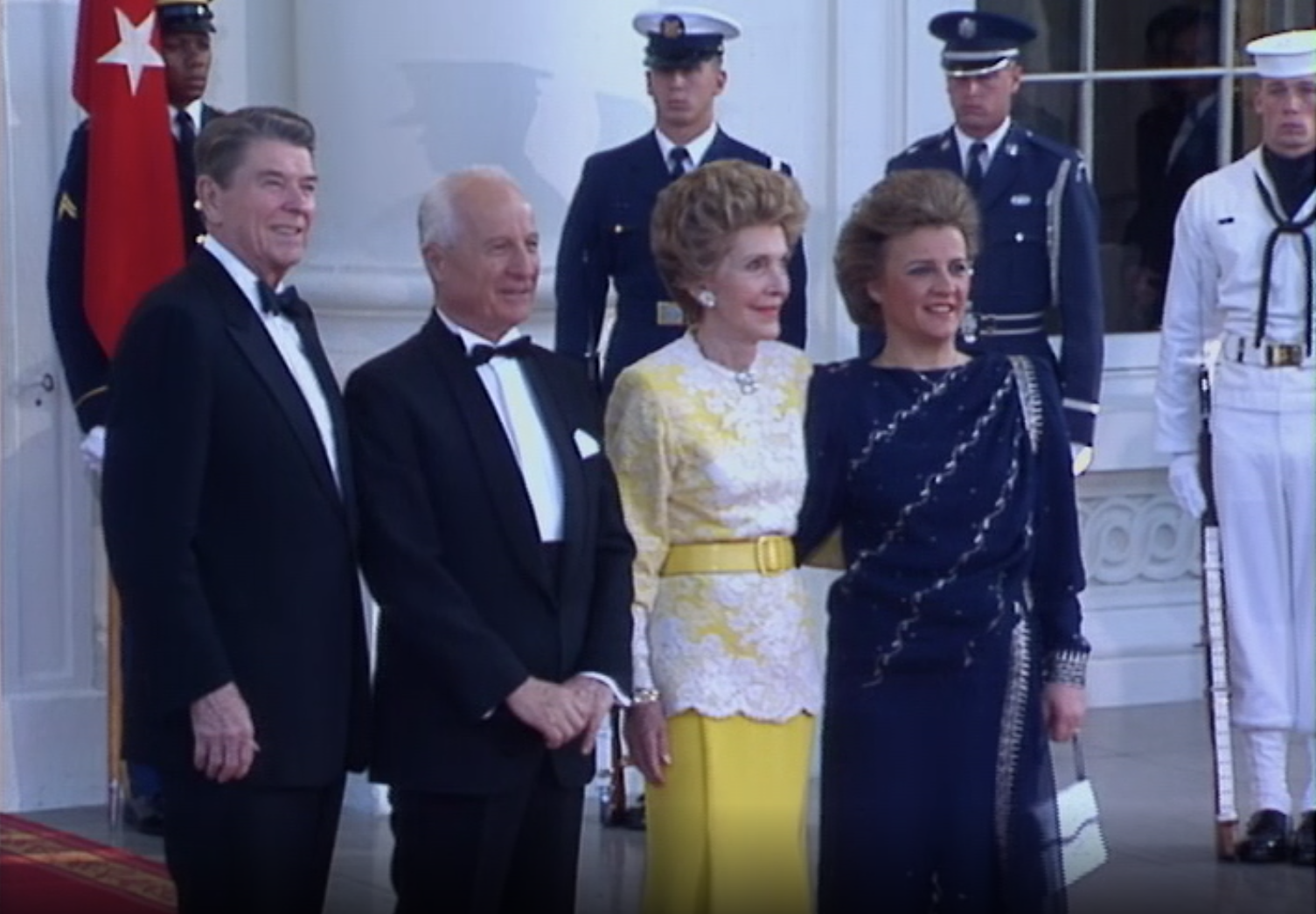
1988: Reagan meeting President Evren

During the 1980s, relations between Turkey and the United States gradually recovered. In March 1980, Turkey and the US signed the Defense and Economic Cooperation Agreement (DECA), in which the United States was granted access to 26 military facilities in return for Turkey's ability to buy modern military hardware and $450 million.

==== Syria (Terrorism) ====
Terrorism in Ba'athist Syria. Syria has been on the U.S. list of state sponsors of terrorism since the list's inception in 1979 and is deemed a "safe haven" for terrorists.

The 1983 Orly Airport attack by ASALA in Paris, France, resulted in the deaths of 8 people and injuries to 55 others, which caused widespread international condemnation. The United States, France, and numerous other countries began listing ASALA as a terrorist organization. |After the 1983 Orly Airport attack, ASALA began to reduce its activities and eventually went underground. During PKK-Syria (1980–1984), between 1982 and 1984, the PKK had received armed combat training by ASALA at the Beqaa Valley in Lebanon and by the Assad regime in Syria. In 1984, the Kurdistan Workers' Party (PKK), designated as a Foreign Terrorist Organization by the U.S. State Department, declared itself a paramilitary group and began staging attacks in the villages and towns of southeastern and eastern Turkey. In 1986, the U.S. withdrew Amb. Scotes in response to evidence of direct Syrian involvement in an attempt to blow up an Israeli airplane. After Syria expelled the Abu Nidal Organization and helped free an American hostage earlier, the U.S. assigned Richard W. Murphy to Damascus in 1987. At the same period, Turkey openly threatened Syria over its support for the PKK. Turkey claimed that Syria employed former Schutzstaffel officer Alois Brunner to train militants.

PKK leader Abdullah Öcalan was hosted in Damascus until 1998.

=== George H. W. Bush administration (1989–1993) ===
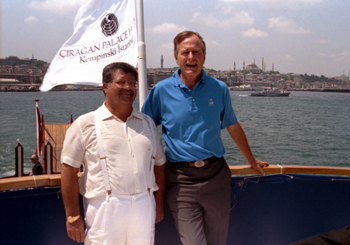
President George H. W. Bush and President Turgut Özal take a cruise on the Bosporus strait in Istanbul (July 21, 1991)

President Turgut Ozal believed Turkey's future security depended on the continuation of a strong relationship with the United States. Although Ankara resented continued attempts by the United States Congress to restrict military assistance to Turkey because of Cyprus and the introduction of congressional resolutions condemning the Armenian genocide, the Özal government generally perceived the administration of President George H. W. Bush as sympathetic to Turkish interests. At this time, Turkish Aerospace Industries (TAI) was established and it started to build F-16 Fighting Falcon jets under license in Turkey. Washington demonstrated its support of Özal's market-oriented economic policies and efforts to open the Turkish economy to international trade by pushing for acceptance of an International Monetary Fund program to provide economic assistance to Turkey. Furthermore, the United States, unlike European countries, did not persistently and publicly criticize Turkey over allegations of human rights violations, nor did it pressure Özal on the Kurdish problem. By 1989 the United States had recovered a generally positive image among the Turkish political elite.

==== Post–Cold War (Dual containment, Turn to east) ====
The post–Cold War era refers to the period following the dissolution of the Soviet Union in December 1991. The end of the Cold War forced Turkey to reassess its international position. The disappearance of the Soviet threat and the perception of being excluded from Europe created a sense of vulnerability with respect to Turkey's position in the fast-changing global political environment. Turkey was an associate member of the EEC. During the Cold War, the U.S. maintained a balance-of-power policy between Iran and Iraq, which later shifted to Dual containment, containing these countries to prevent negative influence on the international community. The previous balance-of-power policy effectively ended, as the Soviet Union was no longer around to serve as a security benefactor for either country. Like the U.S., Turkey also adapted to the changing security concerns in the region. President Özal modified the main principles of Turkish foreign policy towards the Middle East since the foundation of the republic, namely non-interference in intra-Arab disputes and wider Middle Eastern affairs. Turkey became proactive about its role in resolving regional conflicts. Turkey offered ideas and advice on regional issues of common concern to both countries.

The role Turkey played during the Gulf War demonstrated to the public that it was one of the key actors in the region. Turkey expanded ties with the Central Asian members of the CIS.

==== Palestine ====
Turkey supported the Arab–Israeli peace process.

==== Iraq (Gulf War, Northern Safe Zone) ====
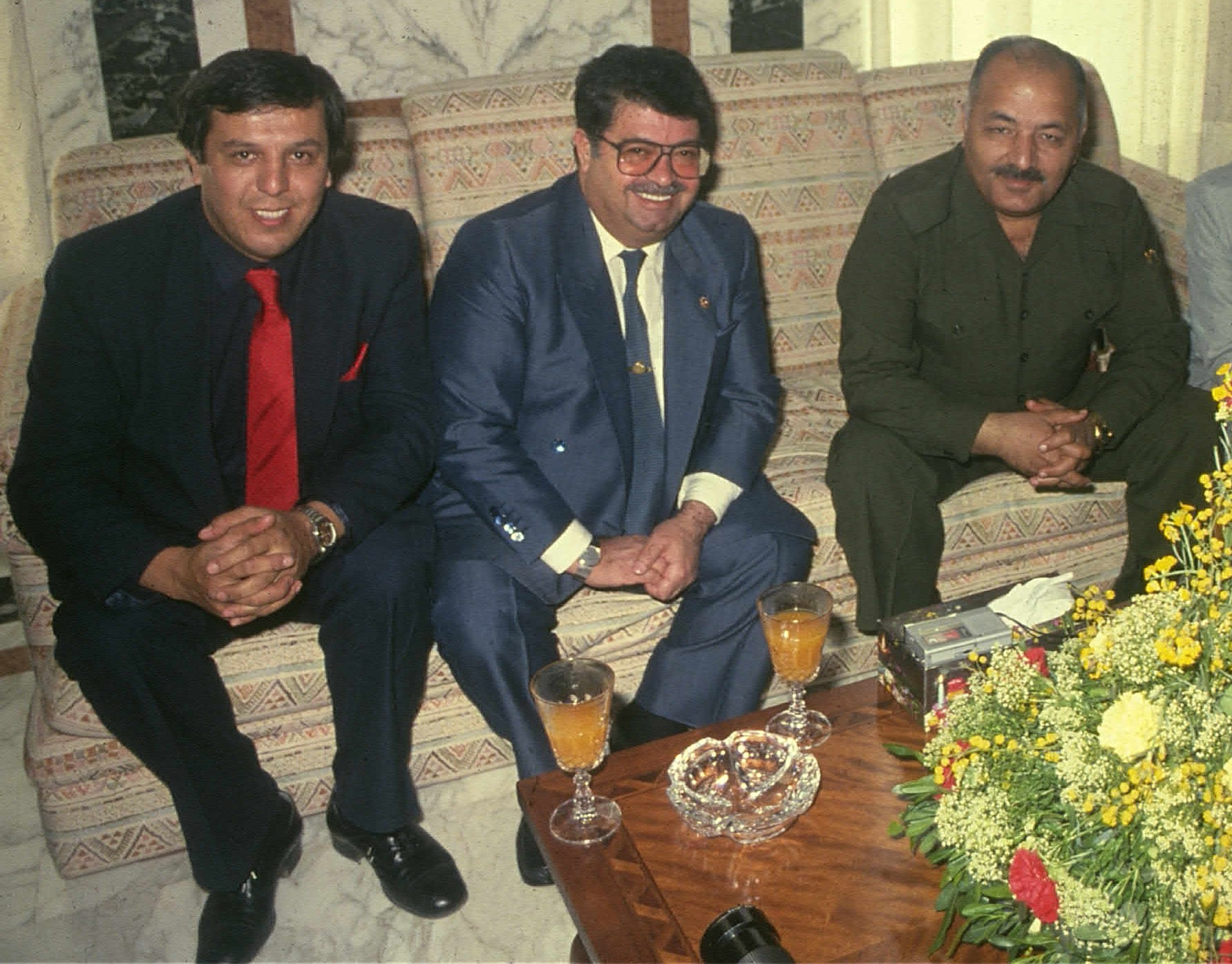
The Kirkuk–Ceyhan Oil Pipeline, Ramadan and Özal

Iraq–United States relations, Iraq–Turkey relations

The Iraq's Taha Yassin Ramadan, said he come to an opinion that Turkey would remain neutral in the conflict after meeting with President Turgut Ozal. President Özal supported the United States' position during the Gulf War (August 2, 1990 – January 17, 1991). Turkey's economic ties to Iraq were extensive and their disruption hurt the country. Turkey lost approximately $60 billion by closing the Kirkuk–Ceyhan Oil Pipeline during the conflict. Just before the war, Chief of the Turkish General Staff General Necip Torumtay resigned in disagreement with the involvement of Turkish ground forces in the conflict, which prevented Turkey's active military engagement.

Turkey allowed United Nations forces (UN SC Resolution 665) to fly missions from its air bases; by doing so Turkey remained a platform for the US attacks against Iraq for the rest of the conflict. Turkey played a role in the war by restraining a sizeable proportion of the Iraqi army on the Turkey–Iraq border.

After the war, Turkey continued to support major United States initiatives in the region, including the creation of a safe zone for Iraqi Kurds over northern Iraq. Turkey received a large number of Iraqi Kurdish refugees following the 1991 uprisings in Iraq (March 1 – April 5, 1991). The Iraqi no-fly zones were two no-fly zones (NFZs) proclaimed by the United States, the United Kingdom, and France to create safe zones for internally displaced people after the war. The US and the UK claimed authorization for the NFZ under United Nations Security Council Resolution 688, though not in its text. The US stated that the NFZs were intended to protect the ethnic Kurdish minority in northern Iraq and Shiite Muslims in the south. Turkey opened its Incirlik and Diyarbakır air bases and became involved in the ground support and intelligence operations for the northern NFZ, which was initially part of Operation Provide Comfort's relief operations before being succeeded by Operation Northern Watch.

The United States' use of Turkish military installations during the bombing of Iraq in 1991 led to anti-war demonstrations in several Turkish cities, and sporadic attacks on United States facilities in 1992 and 1993. NFZs also enabled a safe haven for PKK. Turkey performed cross-border operations into northern Iraq:

- Operation Northern Iraq: October 12 – November 1, 1992

=== Clinton administration (1993–2001) ===
In January 1995, Turkey's political elite had reached a consensus that the country's security depended on remaining a strategic ally of the United States. For this reason, both the Demirel (49) and Çiller (50, 51, 52) governments made efforts to cultivate relations with the administrations of presidents George H. W. Bush and Bill Clinton.

State of affairs

Concerns on Iraq, Cyprus, Greece.

Concerns on Israel position.

Concerns on Kosova position (implications for southeast)

Concerns on democratization (1999 elections)

Concerns on economic crisis

==== Shifting Dynamics (Clean break, memorandum) ====
Shifting Dynamics

Implications

Model Partnership

In 1996, a study group inside the U.S. government led by Richard Perle constructed an approach to solving security issues in the Middle East with an emphasis on "Western values," which was titled "A Clean Break: A New Strategy for Securing the Realm." This new approach to peace included Turkey and Jordan's cooperation with Israel, and weakening, containing, and even rolling back Syria. The clean break was constructed for Isreal. For Turkey, the clean break focused on Turkey's southern interests and southern neighbors. It considered the longstanding Turkish cooperation with Israel (history of the Jews in Turkey) and how Israel and Turkey can build safety and security for themselves. In this strategy paper, the Turkey-Israel relationship was imagined as a "brick wall" (e.g., flemish bond), built so that pulling out one brick would weaken the protection of their people and their economies. Turkey worried about the emergence of an independent Kurdish state and Iran's rising influence. Benjamin Netanyahu said they have the same view towards the PKK. Benjamin Netanyahu said our fundamental position now is that we are going to help each other.

On May 18, 1996, President Demirel survived an assassination attempt by a sympathizer of the National Youth's Foundation, which was affiliated with the Welfare Party, and was carried out in protest of the military cooperation agreement with Israel. The military agreement was a source of anger for a segment who advocated a closer alignment with "conservative values". 20th Parliament of Turkey was 28.7% from Welfare Party. On June 28, 1996, the political ideology and movement founded by Erbakan, Millî Görüş, assumed the position of authority in Turkey's government (54th).

External videos
- 32. Gün
- 1997:Netanyahu on security architecture

On May 23, 1997, Clinton issued Presidential determination No. 97-24 to waive statutory restrictions to maintain diplomatic and military alignment with Turkey, and allow U.S. assistance to Turkey in the national security interest. The waiver referred to past improvements with Turkey but also future issues that could be in jeopardy. Clinton told Congress that Turkey was at the nexus of a number of issues that are critical for the U.S., based on [Turkey's] important and useful relationships with Israel. 23 days earlier, military leadership issued the February 28 1997 Turkish military memorandum, which reflected concerns about the potential weakening of "Western values" at a National Security Council meeting. The religious orders in Turkey and their political/financial influence. Two months later, on June 14, SecState Albright in a message titled "Guard the Democracy" warned the military against actions that could fall into "extra-constitutional" territory. Albright also said [to PM Erbakan] that the U.S. fully supports Turkey's secular, democratic system. Two weeks later, On June 30, Islamist PM Erbakan of the Welfare Party resigned. The military cooperation agreement with Israel continued. The memorandum on increased Islamist influence sparked uproar among conservatives. Later, prosecutors charged Çevik Bir and 30 other officers of this period, sparking a crisis of identity and power. In December 1997, a member of the Welfare Party, Recep Tayyip Erdoğan, recited a modified version of the "Soldier's prayer" poem written by Ziya Gökalp. Erdoğan's modified version included: "The mosques are our barracks, the domes our helmets / The minarets our bayonets and the faithful our soldiers...." Erdoğan was given a ten-month prison sentence for incitement to violence and his mayoral position dropped due to conviction. In 1999, the influential Islamic preacher and Sunni cleric (mufti) based in Izmir Fethullah Gülen, who was imprisoned in 1971 for subversion, was facing another subversion trial.

Rise of Conservatism in Turkey

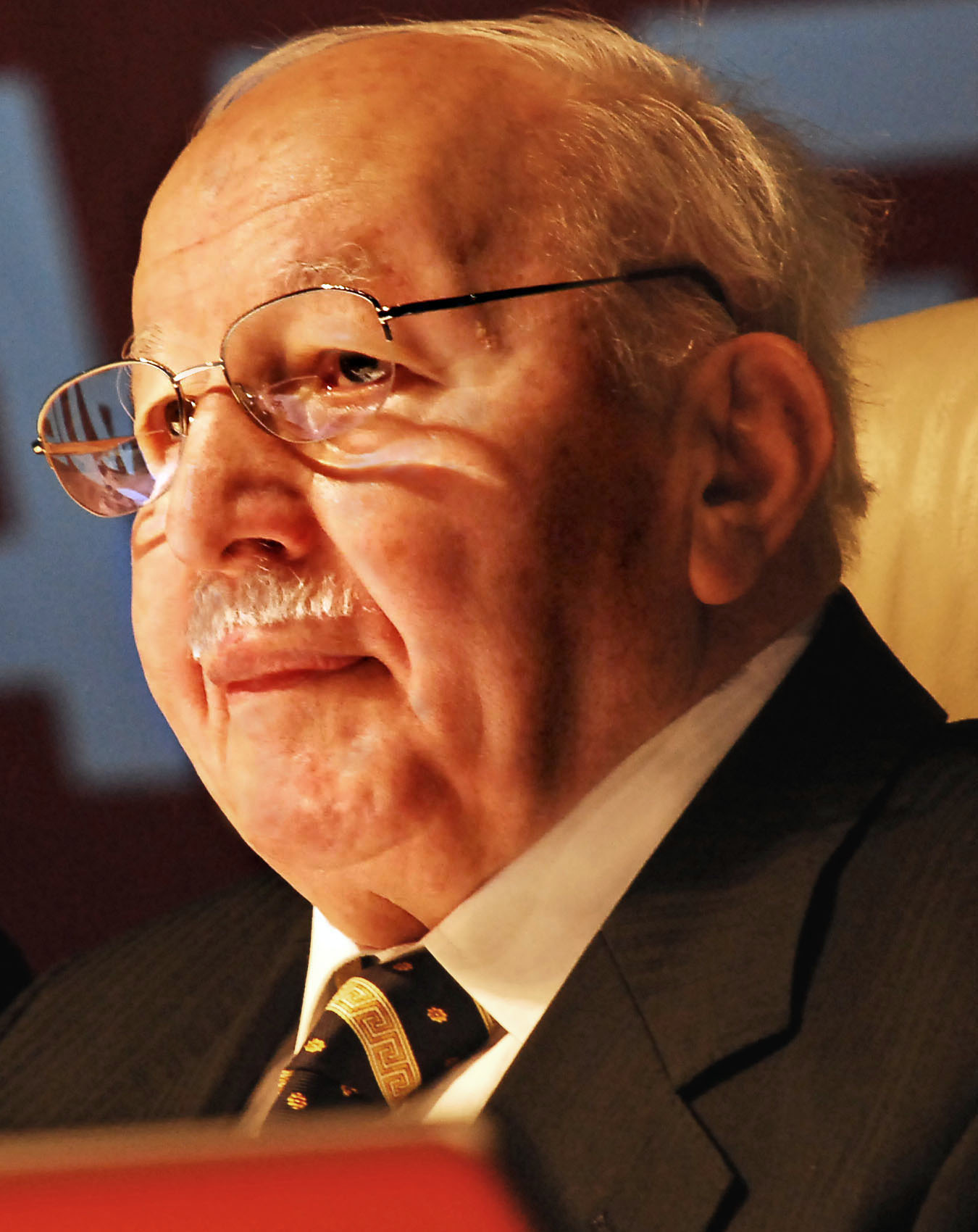
Millî Görüş

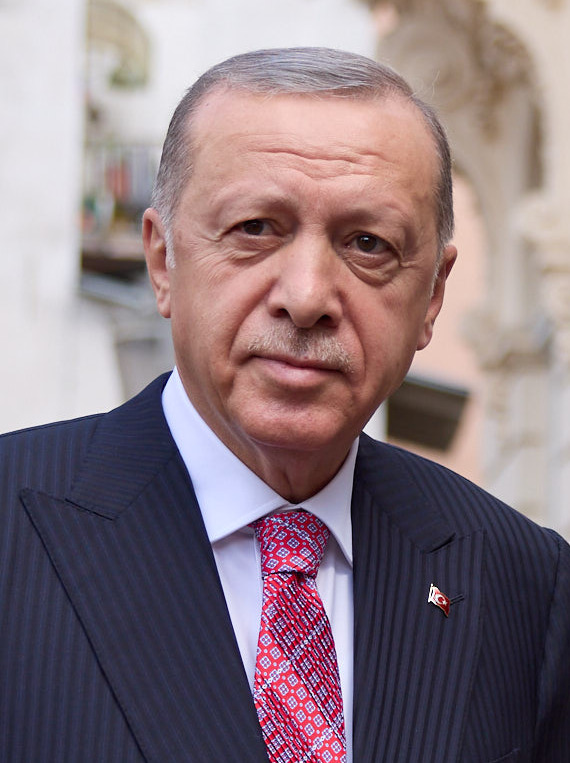
Erdoğanism

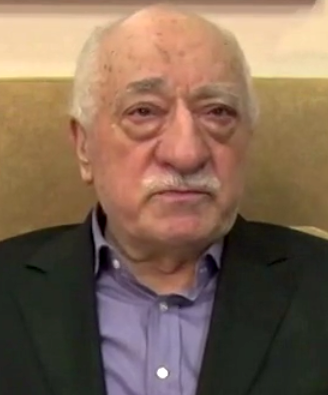
Gülen movement

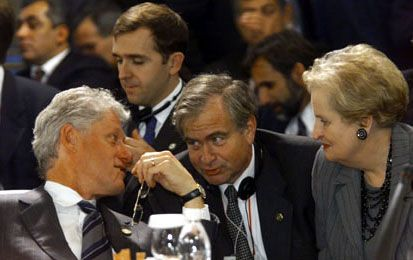
APNSA Berger: We see "Secular Islamic Model" in Turkey

In the 1999 Turkish general election, Bülent Ecevit's Democratic Left Party (DSP) emerged as the biggest party and swept the board in most of Turkey's western provinces after the capture of Kurdistan Workers' Party leader Abdullah Öcalan, who was ousted from Syria. 57th government of Turkey was a win for Ecevit and Ecevitism.

==== Iraq (Terrorism) ====
PKK camps in northern Iraq

1995:PM Ciller to President Clinton 5:30: "they [U.S.] know about this. This land became a "No Man's Land". Without authority. It is not our making. It is not only our responsibility either."

Turkey saw the U.S. failure to halt PKK activities in northern Iraq (Northern Safe Zone) as evidence of a double standard with respect to terrorism and Turkey's security more broadly. Turkey performed:

- Operation Steel: March 20 – May 4, 1995
- Operation Hammer: May 12 – July 7, 1997
- Operation Dawn: September 25 – October 15, 1997

In September 1998, Masoud Barzani and Jalal Talabani signed the US-mediated Washington Agreement and established a formal peace treaty. In the agreement, the parties agreed to share revenue, share power, and deny the use of northern Iraq to the PKK. President Bill Clinton signed the Iraq Liberation Act into law, providing for military assistance to Iraqi opposition groups, which included the PUK and KDP. PKK insurgency waned following the Second Army moving to the border of Syria, which was followed by the PKK leader's expulsion from Syria and the U.S.-assisted 1999 capture and subsequent trial and conviction.

==== Syria (Terrorism, Adana Agreement) ====
Turkey condemned Syria for supporting the PKK. Turkey and Syria nearly engaged in war (a narrowly averted conflict) when Turkey threatened military action if Syria continued to shelter Abdullah Öcalan in Damascus, his long-time haven. Öcalan was the leader and a founding member of the PKK. As a result, the Syrian government forced Öcalan to leave the country, who was captured in Kenya on February 15, 1999, while being transferred from the Greek embassy to Jomo Kenyatta International Airport in Nairobi, in an operation by the National Intelligence Organization (MIT) with the help of the CIA.

The Adana Agreement was signed between Turkey and Syria regarding terrorism originating (mainly PKK) from Syria into Turkey. This agreement would become a contentious issue between the U.S. and Ankara later, as Turkey would not use the powers in the agreement to move into Syria militarily against ISIS. The Syrian government would also declare that it feels no longer bound by the agreement.

==== Iran (Natural gas) ====
Sanctions

Pipeline and Sanctions.

Uğur Mumcu memorial

On the morning of January 24, 1993, Uğur Mumcu was killed by a C-4 plastic bomb. The investigation initially connected the assassination to Iran. It was claimed that Iran's Ministry of Intelligence employed the Hezbollah to carry out the assassination. Against the negative public opinion on Iran, the Tabriz–Ankara pipeline was a priority to the 54th government of Turkey. In 1996, PM Erbakan visited Tehran for the pipeline project, and Iran's cooperation against the PKK was part of the negotiations. This visit was perceived as a snub to the Iran and Libya Sanctions Act. R. Nicholas Burns said: 'We have made very clear to the Turkish government that Iran is a state that should be isolated. We think that business-as-usual relations with Iran are not wise.'

=== George W. Bush administration (2001–2009) ===
State of Affairs

Concerns on Erdogan & AKP

Concerns on 2002 elections

Concerns on 2007 elections

According to leaked diplomatic cables originating from 2004, then Prime Minister Erdoğan was described by U.S. diplomats as a "perfectionist workaholic who sincerely cares for the well-being of those around him". He was also described as having "little understanding of politics beyond Ankara" and as surrounding himself with an "iron ring of sycophantic (but contemptuous) advisors". He is said to be "isolated", and that his MPs and Ministers feel "fearful of Erdogan's wrath". Diplomats state that "he relies on his charisma, instincts, and the filterings of advisors who pull conspiracy theories off the Web or are lost in neo-Ottoman Islamist fantasies".

==== Great-Power in the Middle East (Israel, Davos incident) ====
The Project for the New American Century (PNAC) was established "to promote American global leadership," as its members viewed American leadership as beneficial to both America and the world, and sought to build support for "a Reaganite policy of military strength and moral clarity." The organization's influence originated with its members in the administration of Bush, including Dick Cheney, Donald Rumsfeld, Paul Wolfowitz, and seven others in decision-making positions. Foreign policy of the George W. Bush administration. This group challenged regimes hostile to American interests and values, which supported unilateral military action to advance U.S. interests, particularly in the Middle East. Shortly after the Sep 11 attacks, Wesley Clark cited a Pentagon policy and outline of a plan to "take out seven countries in five years." PNAC's push for U.S. regime change in Iraq strained Turkey. Turkey feared cross-border instability (refugees from Iraq), economic fallout, and the rise of entities aligned with the PKK. Turkey's nightmare. The October 2007 clashes in Hakkâri and simultaneous introduction of the H.Res.106 Armenian Genocide Resolution by Rep. Schiff made the streets of Turkey erupt with anger. The Bush administration's response to north Iraq PKK camps.

What did PNAC want from Turkey? It can be found in the neoconservative doctrine (manifesto), A Clean Break: A New Strategy for Securing the Realm. "A Clean Break" was "a kind of US-Israeli position paper, and it proposed "a mini-cold war" in the Middle East, advocating the use of proxy armies for regime changes, destabilization, and containment." It said, "Rather than pursuing a 'comprehensive peace' with the entire Arab world, Israel should work jointly with Jordan and Turkey to 'contain, destabilize, and roll back ' those entities that are threats to all three," and continued with supporting facts: "Syria repeatedly breaks its word. It violated numerous agreements with the Turks, and has betrayed the United States by continuing to occupy Lebanon in violation of the Taef agreement in 1989." The document, in the operations, states: "Israel can shape its strategic environment, in cooperation with Turkey and Jordan, by weakening, containing, and even rolling back Syria." The 2008 Syria-Israel peace talks progressed through Erdoğan literally serving as the go-between. Erdoğan invested massive political capital. The negotiations fell apart during the fourth round of indirect talks in Ankara while Israeli PM Ehud Olmert was expressing the progress. The news of Israel's military launching Operation Cast Lead arrived. Erdoğan publicly condemned the military offensive. Israel had a different vision for its strategic security needs.

External videos
- World Economic Forum: Davos Annual Meeting
- Gaza: The Case for Middle East Peace

On February 1, the 2009 Davos incident at the WEF session "Gaza: The Case for Middle East Peace" coincided with a radical domestic transformation that led Turkey to revise its international alliance preferences as a member of a Western alliance (NATO). Erdoğan's outburst at the Davos Summit marked a critical juncture, signaling a shift in Turkey's national agenda and alignment policies. The fallout came on May 31, 2010, after nine activists were killed over the Gaza flotilla raid after Netanyahu cleared the operation; the signs of changing position were visible. "A Clean break" position regarding "...in cooperation with Turkey..." lost its viability. As the 2000s ended, Turkish political parties could not ignore the domestic political shifts. As the U.S. prioritized mainly Israel's security needs, Turkey pursued more independent strategies and moved away from U.S.-Israel security designs. At this juncture, Davutoğlu (Minister of Foreign Affairs, May 1, 2009 – August 29, 2014) aimed to establish Turkey as an influential power within the Balkans, Caucasus, and the Middle East by resolving regional disputes and building peaceful, cooperative economic and political ties to achieve economic development. He called his doctrine the "Zero Problems with Neighbors," but the West called it "Neo-Ottomanism." Why did the West call it Neo-Ottomanism? "Ottomanism" was primarily conceived as a reform and renewal project for the declining Ottoman Empire in the 19th century. Ottomanism did not prevent the dissolution of the Ottoman Empire.

==== War on terror (Rendition) ====
Turkey had remained a close ally of the United States in the war on terror after the September 11 attacks. Turkish President Ahmet Necdet Sezer and Prime Minister Bülent Ecevit condemned the attacks, and the Turkish government then ordered all of its flags at half-mast for one day of mourning. Turkey participated in the International Security Assistance Force.

War on terror

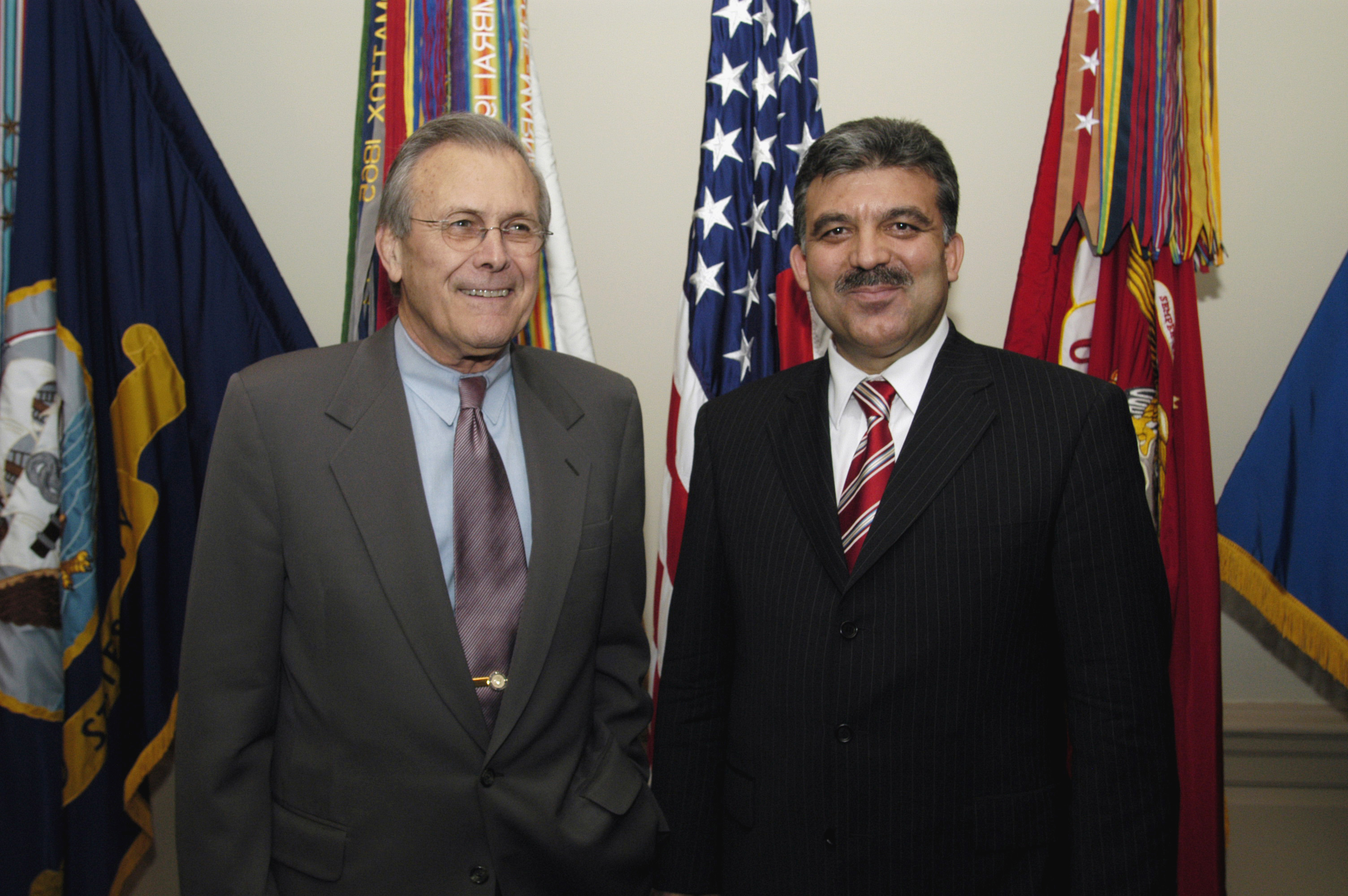
Gül with Rumsfeld on July 24, 2003

Administrative Review of Murat Kurnaz

Kurnaz v George W. Bush

Turkish detainees at Guantanamo Bay

According to a report by the Open Society Foundations, Turkey participated at one point or another in the CIA's extraordinary rendition program. U.S. ambassador Ross Wilson revealed the involvement of the Incirlik airbase in a diplomatic cable dated June 8, 2006, which described Turkey as a crucial ally in the "global war on terror" and an important logistical base for the US-led war in Iraq. On June 14, 2006, Turkish foreign ministry officials told reporters: "The Turkish government and state never played a part [in the secret transfers] ... and never will." According to evidence, the US base was a transit stop in taking detainees to secret prisons. The cable also stated: "We recommend that you do not raise this issue with TGS [Turkish general staff] pending clarification from Washington on what approach state/OSD/JCS/NSC [national security council] wish to take."

==== Syria (normalization) ====
Israel-Syria talks, and Iran

Accepting Turkey in the Israel-US economic zone.

Erdogan and Olmert, Israel-Syria

During the February 2007 visit to Turkey, Israeli Prime Minister Ehud Olmert discussed the possibility of Turkish mediation between his country and Syria. Turkey tried to be involved in the negotiations with the ongoing Syrian-Israeli disputes.

Turkey offered peaceful political and economic cooperation with Syria. In April 2008, during Erdogan's visit to Damascus, Turkey urged Syrians to "liberalize" in line with Turkey’s recent economic/social reform model, noting that their national income had increased from $230 billion to $659 billion since 2003. Erdogan stated, “This can easily be done in Syria…We are willing to put our hand in yours!” On May 21, 2008, after considerable dialogue by Davutoglu, Israel, Syria, and Turkey simultaneously announced that Israel and Syria had launched proximity (indirect) peace talks in Istanbul. Turkey helped lay the groundwork for a peace agreement without getting credit for achieving it.

Because of Syria’s destabilizing influence in Lebanon, support for Hezbollah and Hamas, and ties with Iran, Bush administration policy was isolating Syria, not peace negotiations. Dana Perino stated that the Administration was not surprised by the May 21 announcement and did not object to it. Condoleezza Rice, “We would welcome any steps that might lead to a comprehensive peace in the Middle East.... We are working very hard on the Palestinian track. It doesn’t mean that the U.S. would not support other tracks.”

Later, the U.S. characterized this effort as an opportunity to convey appropriate messages to Damascus; the Istanbul negotiations were a forum rather than real peace negotiations. The U.S. shifted its policy development to Iran Syria Policy and Operations Group. Perino stated, “What we hope is that this is a forum to address various concerns that we all share about Syria—U.S., Israel, and many others—in regard to Syria’s support for Hamas and Hezbollah (and) the training and funding of terrorists that belong to these organizations.... We believe it could help us to further isolate Iran....” After successful agreements between Israel and Syria, parties were transitioning from indirect to direct negotiations. What did indirect talks agree on besides the pullout? Israel got full peace, open borders, diplomatic and commercial relations with Syria, and Syria to halt military ties with Iran and its regional proxies, Hezbollah and Hamas. Corruption investigations surrounding Israeli Prime Minister Ehud Olmert limited both sides' capacity to finalize the accord. The talks stopped after the Operation Cast Lead in December 2008. Ehud Olmert succeeded by Benjamin Netanyahu on 31 March 2009. Netanyahu passed legislation that made it tougher to withdraw from the Golan. Syria denounced Netanyahu's law as "proof" that Netanyahu's doesn't want peace. Erdoğan criticized Israel and severely strained Turkish-Israeli relations. In October 2009, Turkey banned Israel's participation in the Anatolian Eagle military exercise, and Netanyahu stated "Turkey can't be [an] honest broker", between Syria and Israel. The peace negotiations ended.

==== Iraq (territorial integrity) ====
Iraq War

Turkey, deployment of forces

Effects of Turkey's 2003 refusal of the U.S.

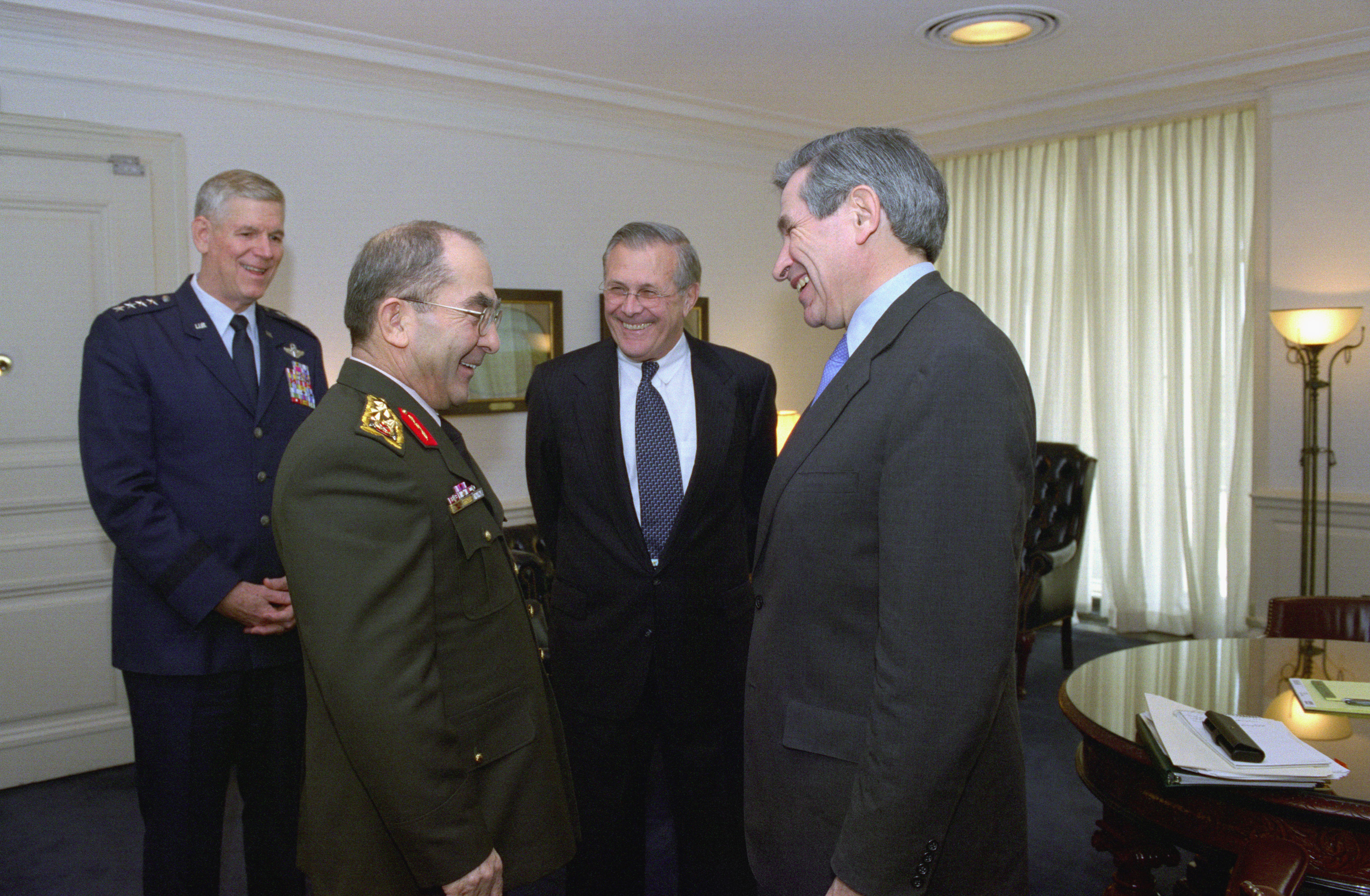
On March 5, 2003, Gen. Hilmi Özkök, Chief of the Turkish General Staff, stated that he believed it was possible to shorten the duration of the war in Iraq by opening a second front near the Turkey-Iraq border.

Turkey is particularly cautious about a Kurdish state arising from a destabilized Iraq. Turkey has fought an insurgent war against the PKK, which is listed as a terrorist organization internationally by a number of states and organizations. Iraq was a safe haven for PKK. The Iraqi Kurds were organized under the PUK and KDP, who later cooperated with American forces during the 2003 invasion of Iraq.

In 2002 Morton I. Abramowitz (1989–1991 US Ambassador) said, in regards to Turkey's involvement in an upcoming war: "It is hard to believe that in the end the Turks would not cooperate with the United States if war takes place, with or without UN blessing". Vice President Dick Cheney's only trip abroad in his first three years at the office was a four-day trip to Ankara. Prime Minister Bülent Ecevit welcomed Cheney to a working dinner on March 19, who offered $228 million to aid in military efforts provided that international military operations took command of the Afghanistan peacekeeping force. Turkey's position on Iraq was presented to Cheney. In December 2002, Turkey moved approximately 15,000 soldiers to its border with Iraq. The 2003 invasion of Iraq faced strong domestic opposition in Turkey: opinion polls showed that 80% of Turks were opposed to the war. The Turkish Parliament's position reflected the public's. The March 1, 2003, motion at the Turkish Parliament could not reach the absolute majority of 276 votes needed to allow US troops to attack Iraq from Turkey (62,000 troops and more than 250 planes), the final tally being 264 votes for and 250 against. BBC's Jonny Dymond said the knife-edge vote is a massive blow to the government which has a majority in parliament. On March 11, Abdullah Gül resigned as Turkey's Prime Minister. Chief of the General Staff of Turkey Hilmi Özkök said "Turkey would suffer the effects of the war [motion also included twice as many Turkish troops to be deployed to northern Iraq]." The US did not immediately re-deploy the forces intended for staging in Turkey and the State Department asked for "clarification" of the Turkish vote. In the end, the US pulled the offer of $6 billion in grants and up to $24 billion in loan guarantees, which caused Turkey's stock market to plunge by 12%.

In connection with its invasion of Iraq, the United States requested that Turkey allow 62,000 soldiers to deploy from its territory and that 9 Turkish air bases allow United States bombers to deploy. Tension developed when the Turkish government agreed to the request, but parliament rejected it on March 1, 2003. On March 20, 2003, following a visit by United States Secretary of State Colin Powell to Ankara, an agreement was consummated to allow the United States Air Force to use Turkish airspace. Relations improved in 2009 following United States President Barack Obama's visit to Turkey.

PKK camps in northern Iraq

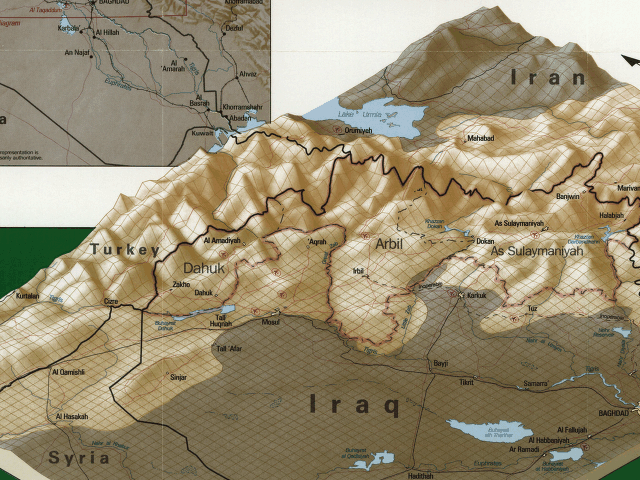
Operation Sun conflict area

General Ralston on countering the PKK

Countering the PKK

"Iraq’s territorial integrity is maintained and the quality of life in Iraq is improved visibly." stated goal at "US and Coalition Objectives" by USDP Feith to Bush and the NSC.

On March 20, the 2003 invasion of Iraq began. On July 4, 2003, Turkish military personnel who were stationed in northern Iraq were captured from their station, led away with hoods over their heads, and interrogated; this later came to be known as the "hood event". Turkish military personnel had stationed military observers in the "northern safe zone" after the 1991 Gulf War. The specific unit was stationed at Sulaimaniya after the civil war broke out in 1996 to monitor a ceasefire between the PUK and KDP. The unit station was a historical Ottoman Empire facility (dwelling), which held the historical archives of the Ottoman Empire. Among the destroyed documents were the deed records of the region. The hood event was strongly condemned by the Turkey's newspapers and referred to Americans as "Rambos" and "Ugly Americans". Chief of the General Staff of Turkey Hilmi Özkök declared the incident as the sign of "crisis of confidence" between the US and Turkey.

During the conflict, Ankara pressured the U.S. into subduing PKK training camps in northern Iraq. The U.S. remained reluctant because northern Iraq was relatively stable compared to the rest of the country. The October 2007 clashes in Hakkâri and simultaneous introduction of the H.Res.106 Armenian Genocide Resolution by Rep. Schiff made the streets of Turkey erupt with anger. On October 17, 2007, the Turkish Parliament voted in favor of allowing the Turkish Armed Forces to take military action against the PKK based in northern Iraq. In response, Bush stated that he did not believe it was in Turkey's interests to send troops into Iraq. Besides Bush and Rice on the phone, Multinational Force commander General Petraeus and Vice Chairman of the Joint Chiefs of Staff General Cartwright rushed to Turkey to calm the situation and deconflict U.S. and Turkish operations as TAF moved into 2008 Turkish incursion into northern Iraq.

==== Russia (Natural Gas, Nuclear Energy) ====
Turkey's fourth attempt to build a nuclear reactor in 2002 was driven by concerns about dependence on Russian gas for electricity generation. US companies did not produce any bids. In fact, Turkey received only bid—from Rosatom. The bid was rejected partly due to defeating the dependency problem. Turkey's build-own-transfer approach failed.

In June 2008, The United States and Turkey began to cooperate on peaceful uses of nuclear energy with a pact that aims for the transfer of technology, material, reactors, and components for nuclear research and nuclear power production in Turkey for an initial 15-year period followed by automatic renewals in five-year increments that provides a comprehensive framework for peaceful nuclear cooperation between the two nations under the agreed non-proliferation conditions and controls. A parallel U.S. bipartisan resolution highlighted the importance of the Turkish Republic's key role in safeguarding Eurasian energy security for its Western and regional allies.

The Center for Strategic and International Studies launched a one-year initiative to evaluate and enhance the Turkish Republic–United States strategic partnership, aiming to develop an implementation plan for the concluded framework by the end of this phase.

After 8 years of failed attempts, due to being perceived as a possible nuclear proliferation front in the West (US), Turkey altered its strategy. Instead of owning a nuclear power plant, Turkey enabled vendors to own the plant. In 2010, Turkey and Russia signed an agreement for nuclear cooperation. From a Eurasian energy security perspective, the US lost a NATO partner (in nuclear cooperation), as this nuclear deal did not solve Turkey's dependence on Russia's natural gas but added a second dependence on nuclear technology.

==== Gülen Movement (Ergenekon, AKP closure) ====
Fethullah Gülen (Pasinler, Erzurum 1941 – Saylorsburg, Pennsylvania 2024) was a Turkish Islamic preacher and Sunni cleric (mufti) who was based in the U.S. since he left Turkey in March 1999, just before being tried in absentia and found guilty of subverting the government of Turkey (occupying senior bureaucratic and judicial positions to create a parallel state) in 2000. In 2002, Gülen applied for "green card." The HS argued for the rejection, while the CIA National Intelligence Council's former vice chairman Graham E. Fuller, former CIA official George Fidas, and former Ambassador to Turkey Morton Abramowitz sided with Gülen and presented affidavits. The court granted Gülen permission to reside in the U.S. Later in 2008, the AKP, which was facing the 2008 Justice and Development Party closure trial, reversed Gülen's conviction in Turkey. AKP's case against the closure trial and Gülen's subversion trial were finalized for the defendants. Prime Minister Erdogan has suggested that the closure case was a response to the government's earlier pursuit of Ergenekon, and/or that Ergenekon was not retribution for the closure. Six years after the reversed conviction, in 2014, Erdogan said that Sunni cleric Gülen should return to Turkey. After the 2016 failed coup, during Obama administration, it was speculated that Gülen planned to return to Turkey like exiled Khomeini.

The Gülen movement, followers of Gülen, is a sub-sect of Sunni Islam based on a Nursian theological perspective as reflected in Fethullah Gülen's religious teachings. Gülen movement's possible involvement in the Ergenekon plot (trials) is controversial. The investigation claimed to study an organization compared to a Counter-Guerrilla. The accused were declared to be the "deep state in Turkey." The Ergenekon trials were a series of high-profile trials that began on October 20, 2008, in which 275 people, including military officers, journalists, and opposition lawmakers, all alleged members of Ergenekon, were accused of plotting against the Erdogan government. The trials resulted in lengthy prison sentences for most of the accused.

Ergenekon trials

CRS: Crisis on Identity and Power

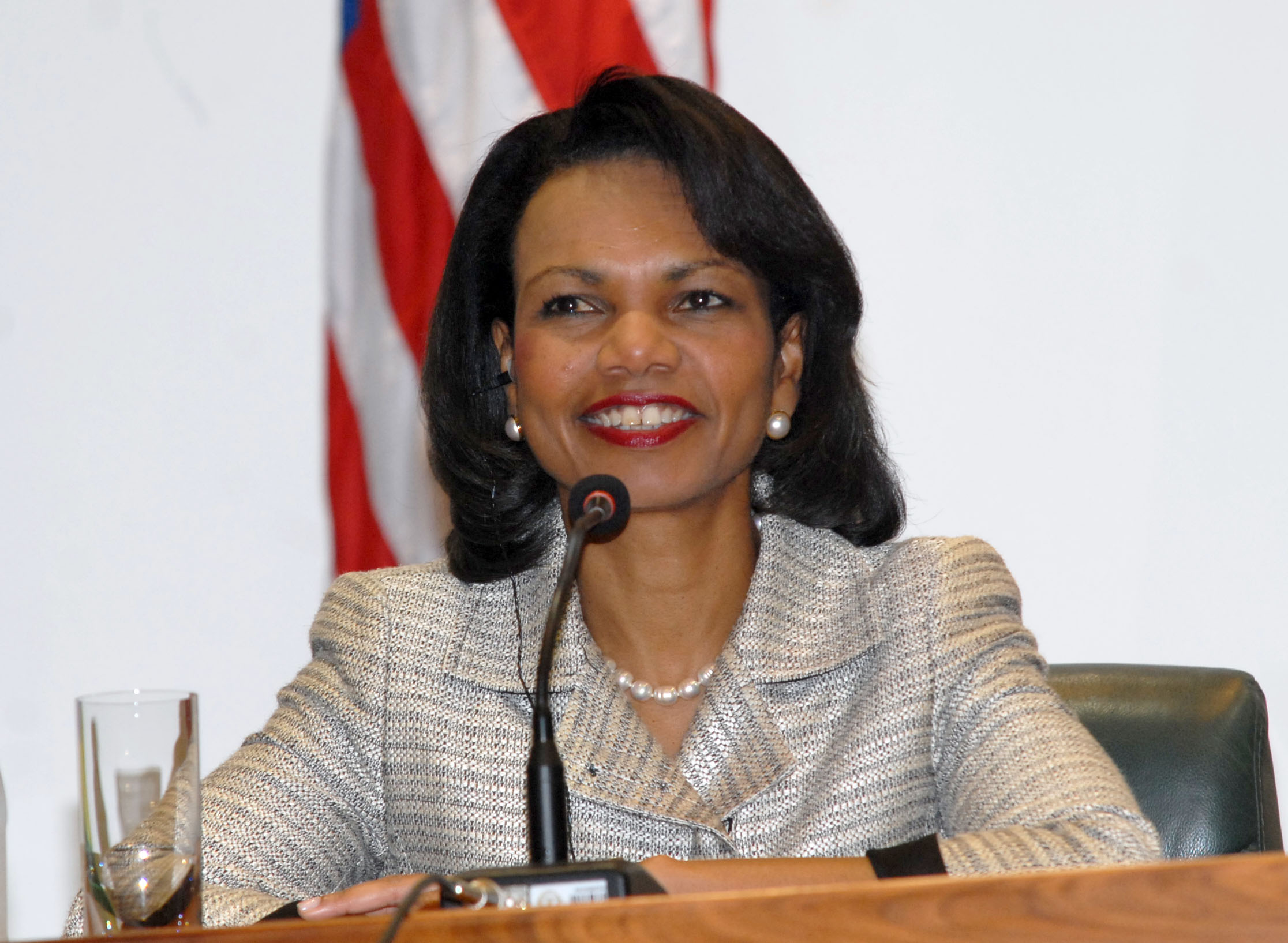
Rice:“But ultimately, these questions about politics and religion and different social values are going to have to be ones that are resolved within the context of Turkish law, politics, and their Constitution.”

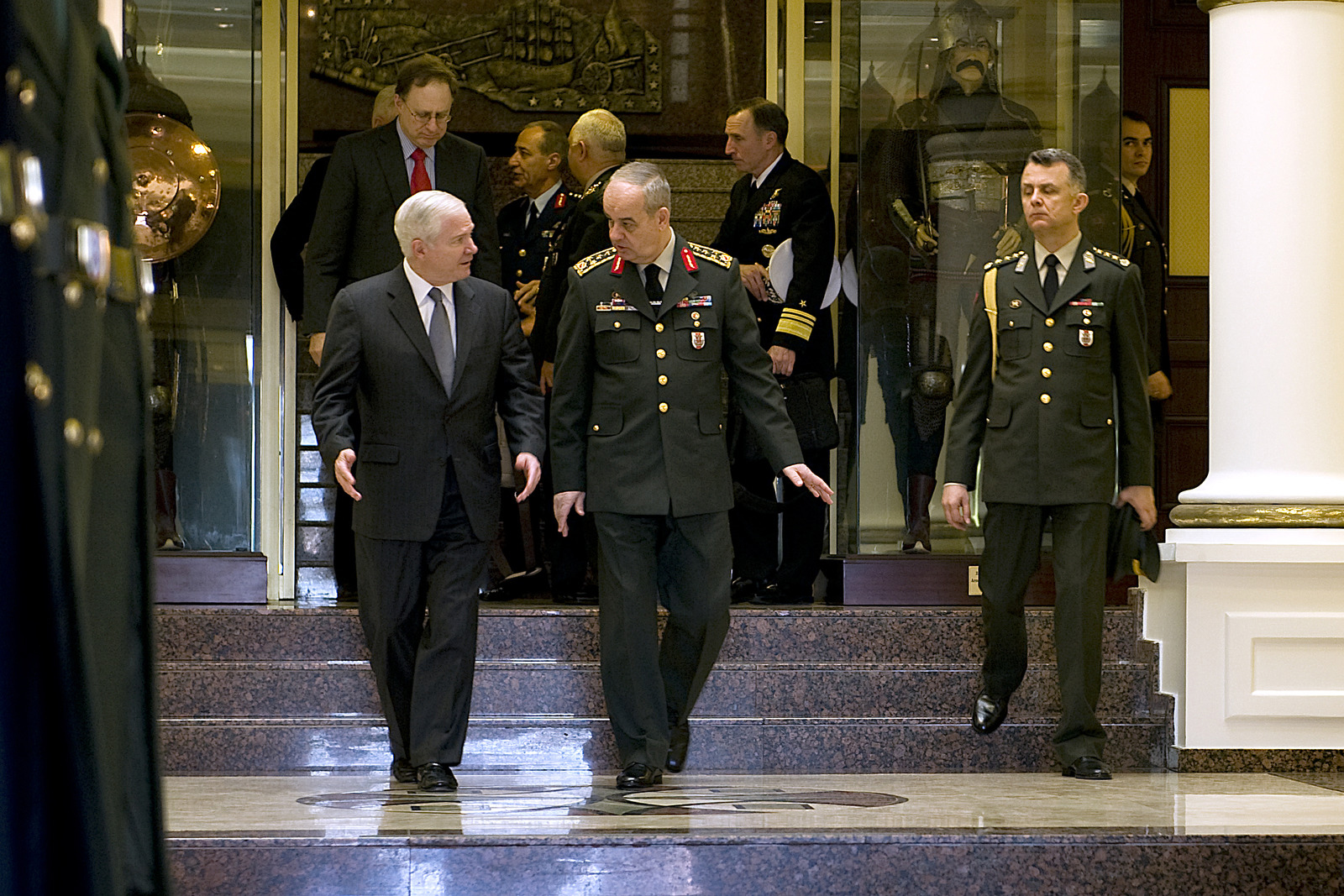
The arrest of U.S. partner in the war on terror Chief of the General Staff Başbuğ on terrorist charges regarded as Gülen movement has the power to imprison whoever it likes.

The US Secretary of State reported on the Turkish investigation into the Ergenekon network and concluded that "the details of the case were murky, however, and Ergenekon's status as a terrorist organization remained under debate at year's end."

=== Obama administration (2009–2017) ===
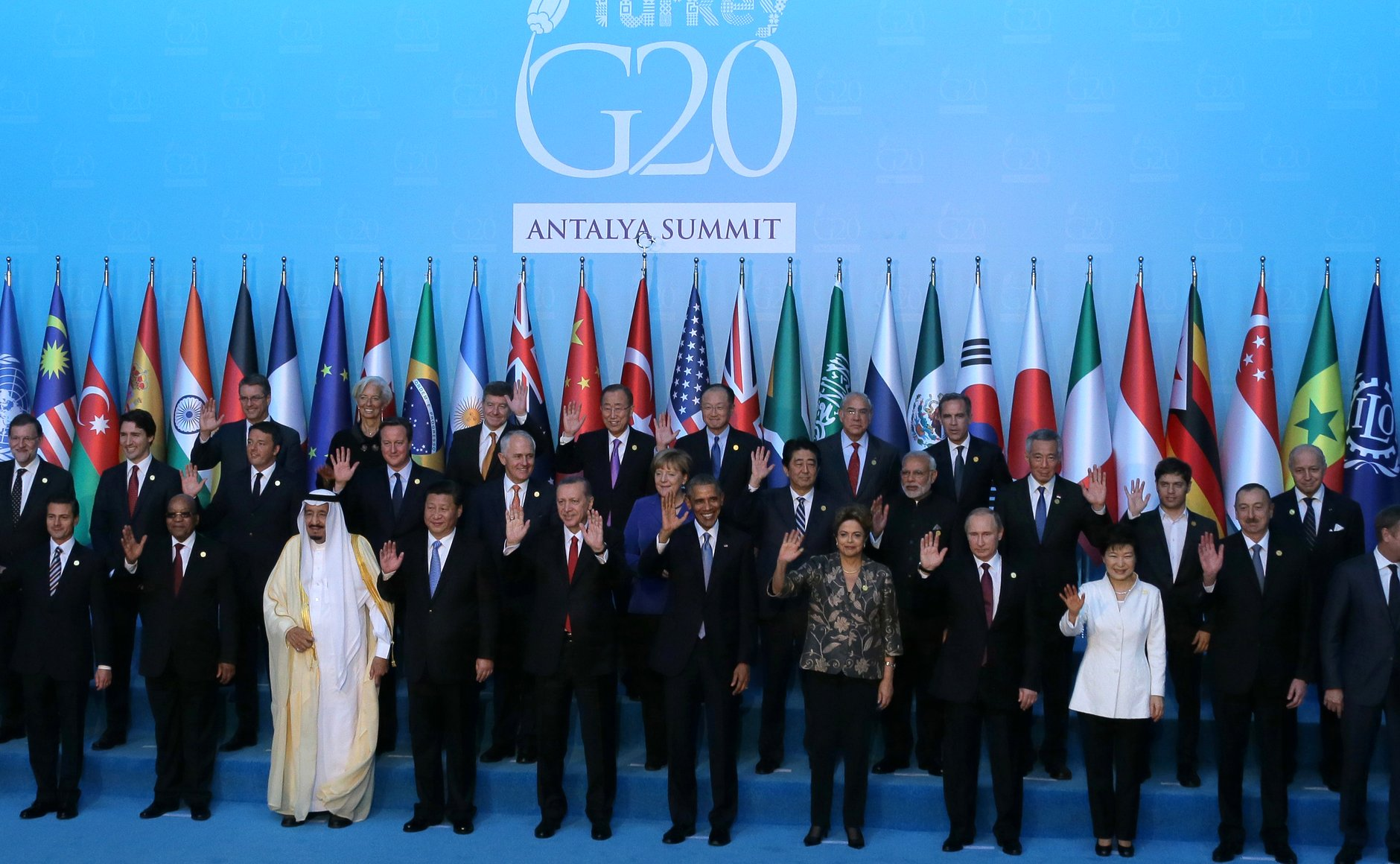
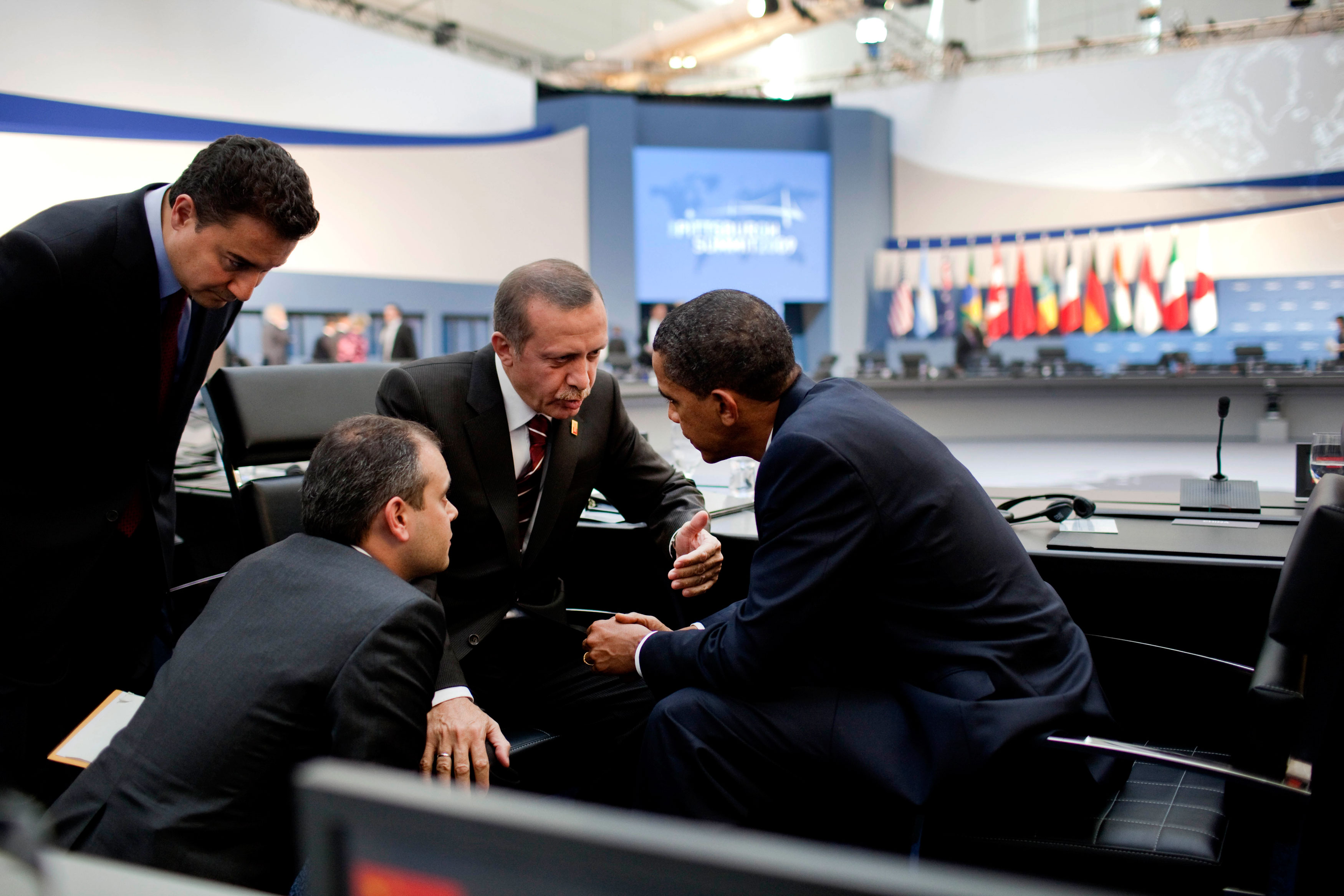
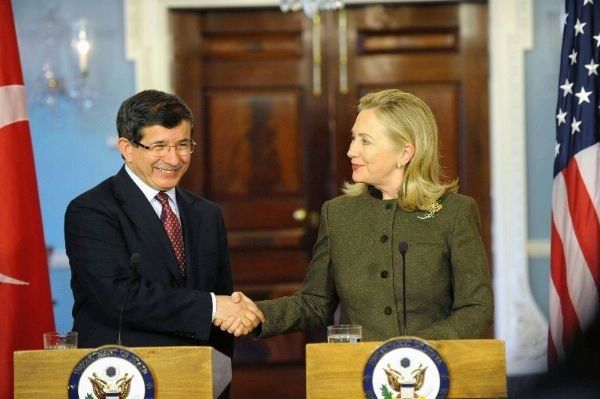
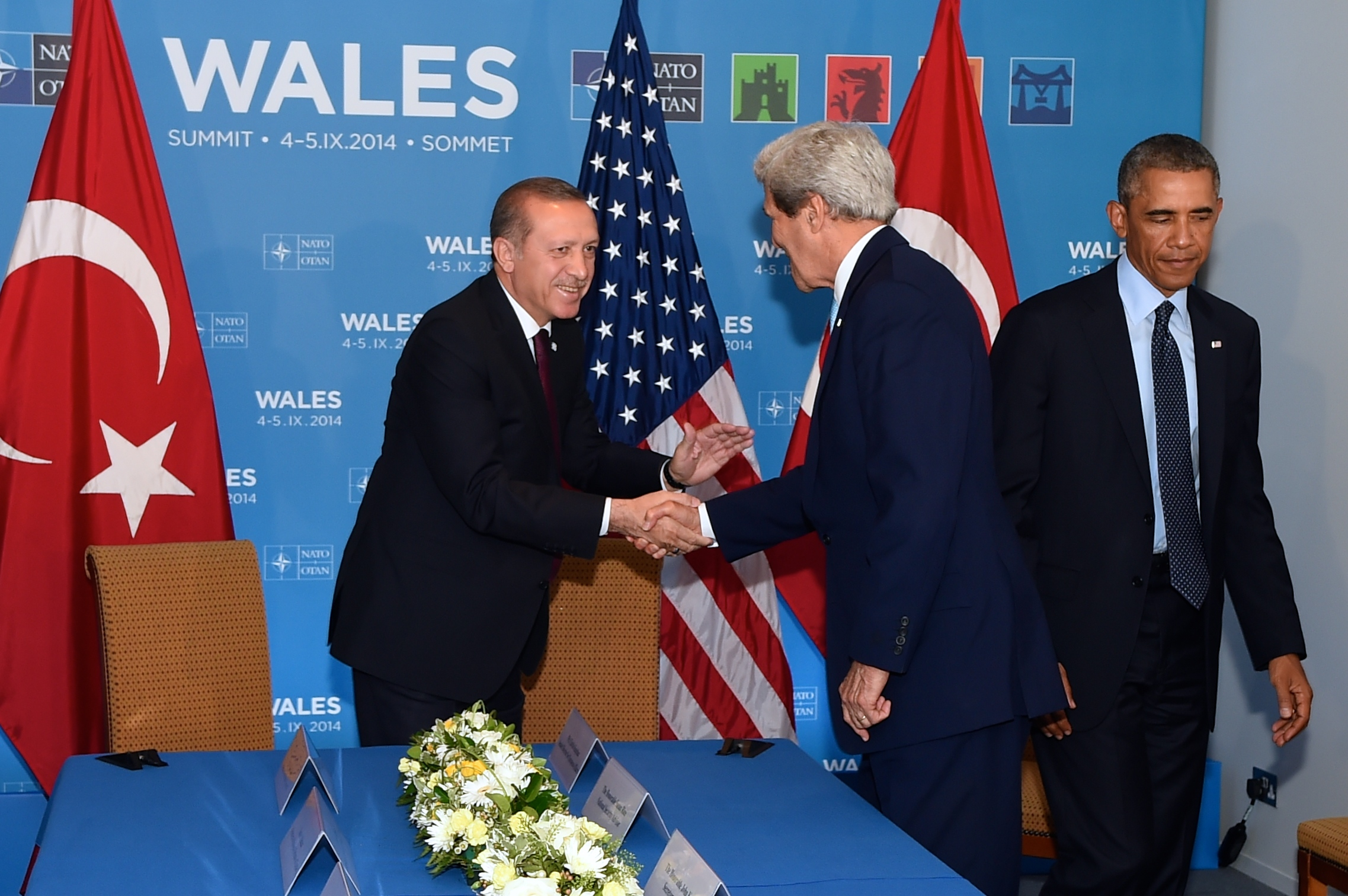
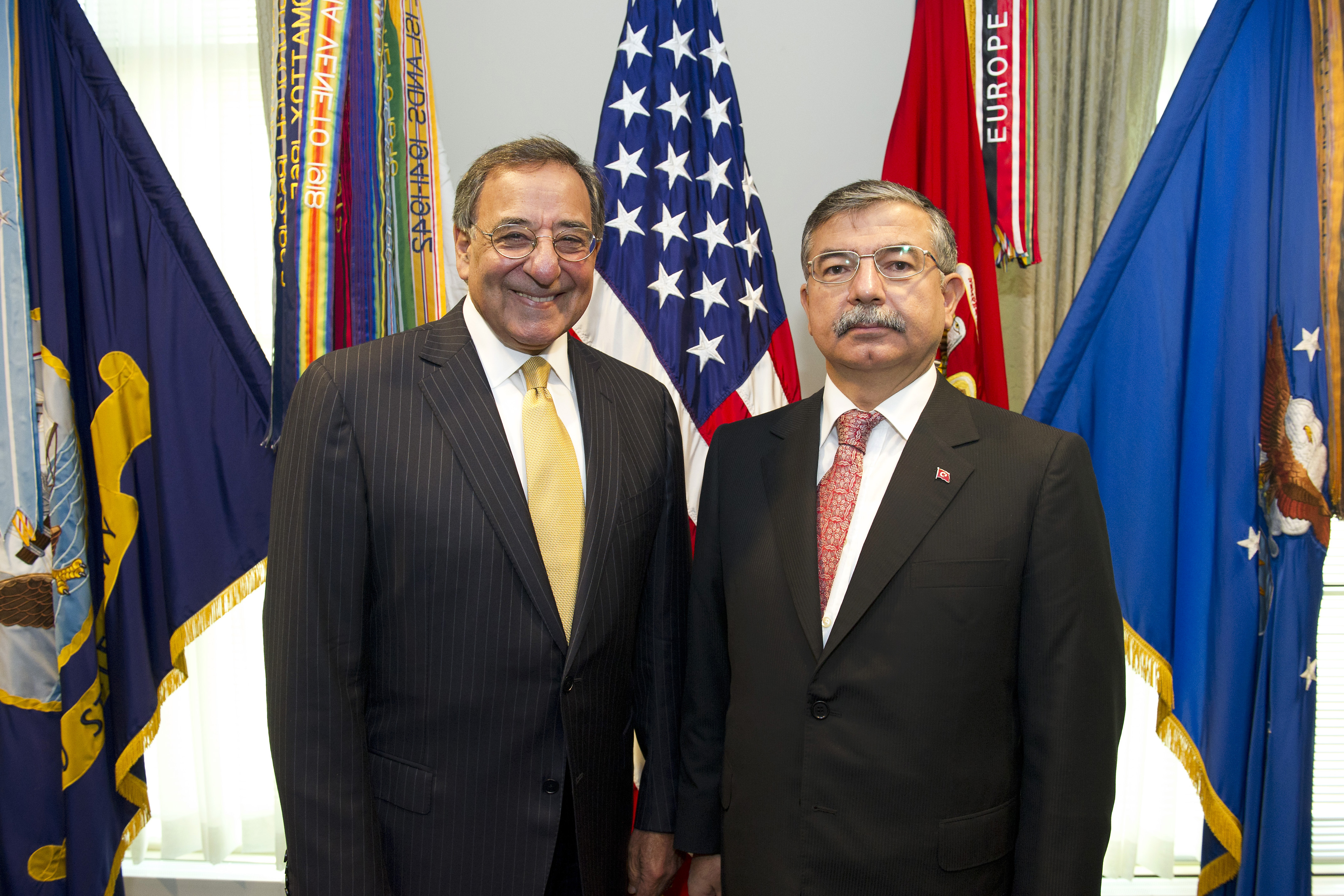
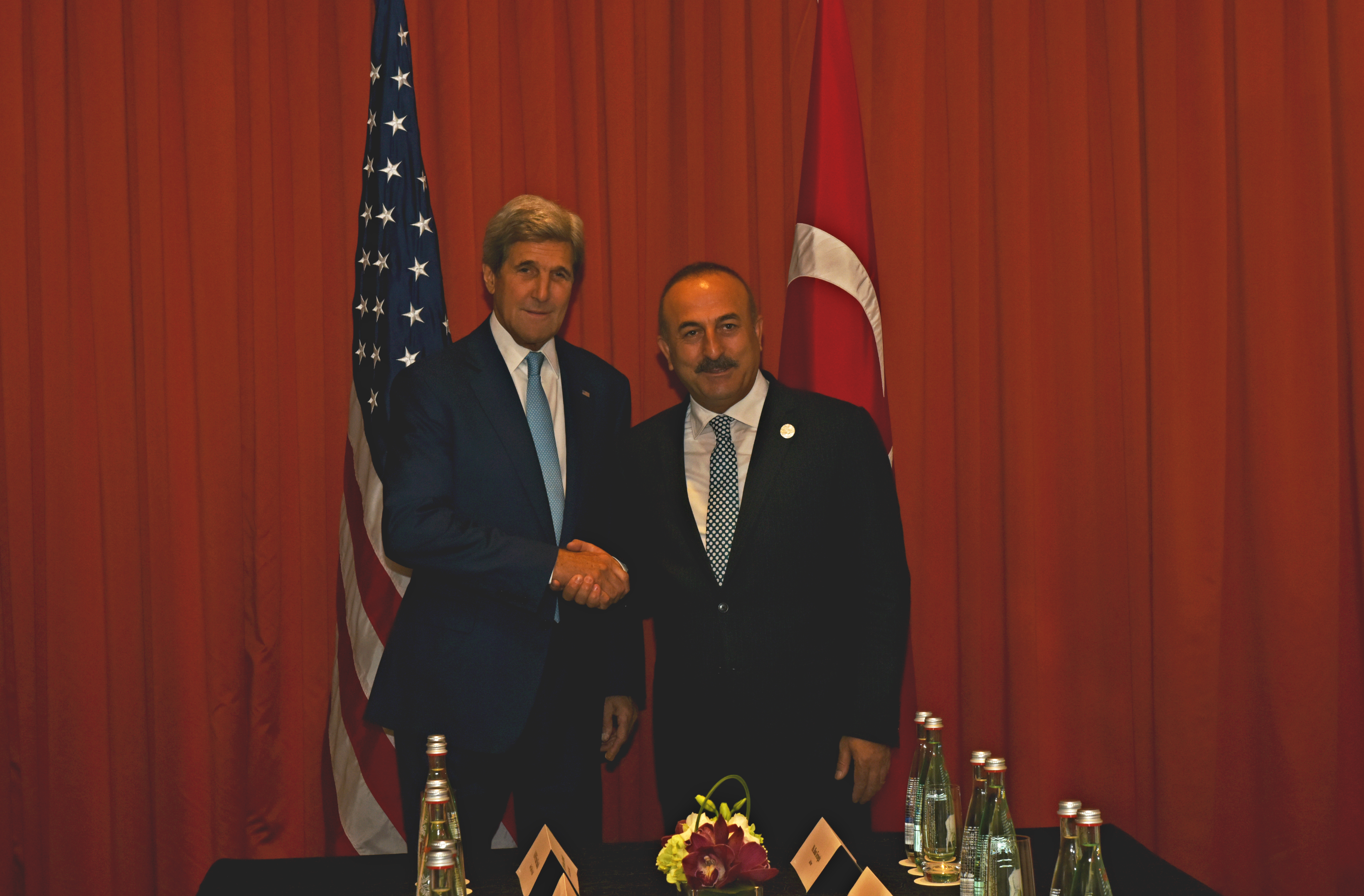
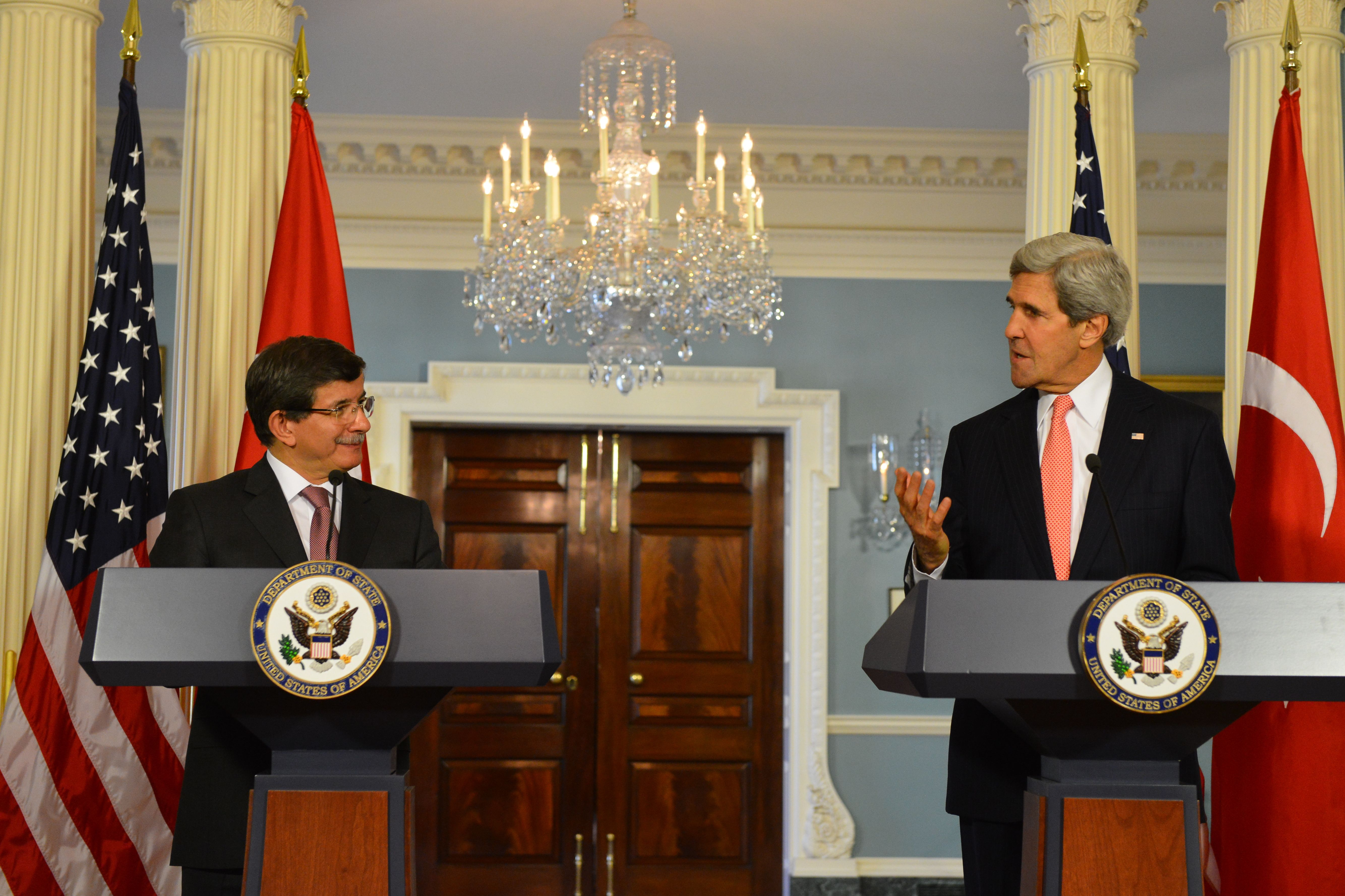
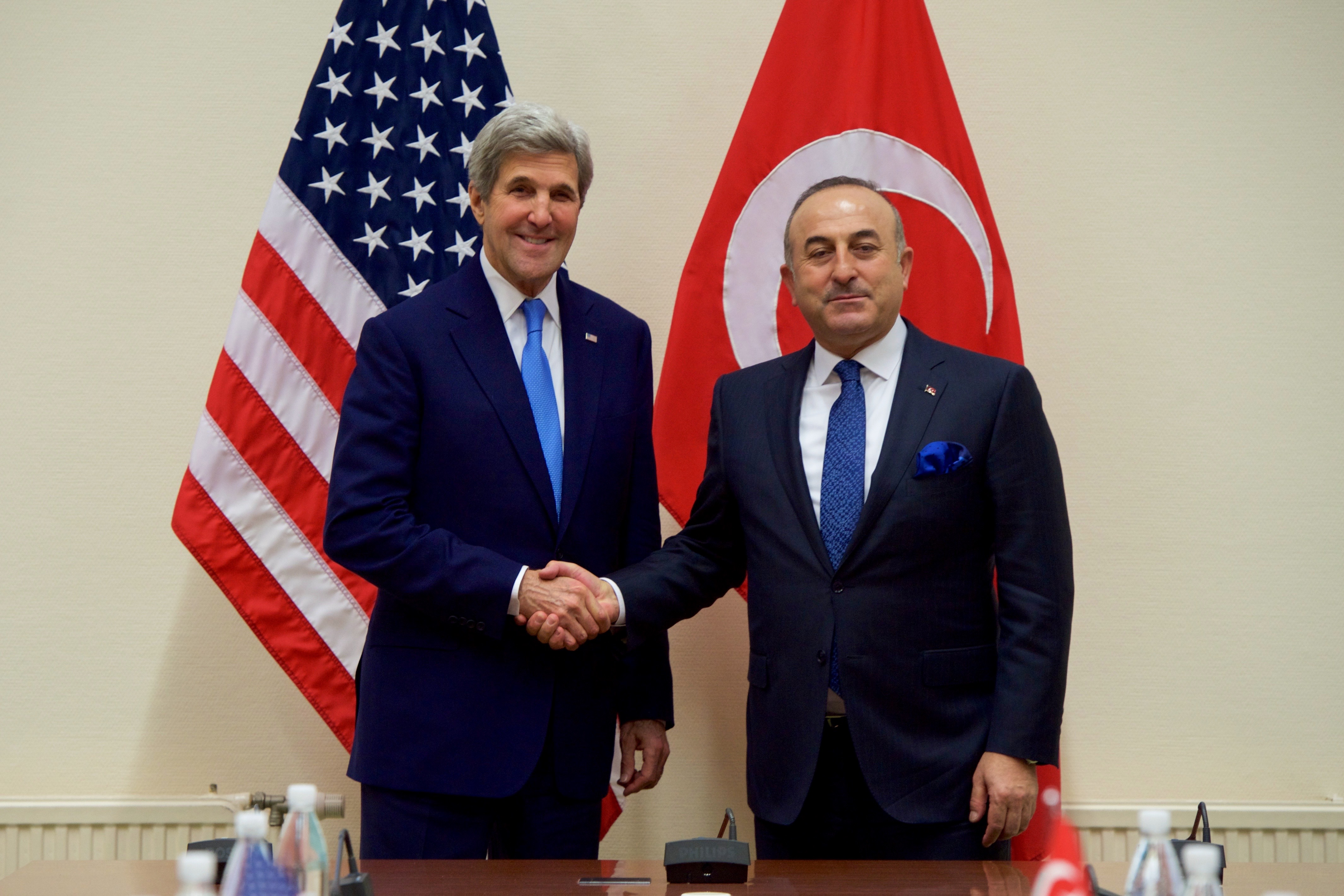

At the beginning of the Obama administration, on May 30, 2009, a U.S. Democratic Party delegation group including U.S. Senators Casey, Kaufman, Lautenberg and U.S. Congressman Walz met with Turkish officials in Ankara to confirm that "Turkey can always depend on the US, while the US can always rely on its close friendship with Turkey". Obama gave impassioned and eloquent speeches in Turkey (Obama visit) and Cairo (A New Beginning). Middle Eastern foreign policy of the Obama administration was a strategic "rebalancing" away from extensive military commitments as a shift from the post-9/11 policies of George W. Bush. In this period, Turkey and President Obama faced the Middle Eastern dysfunctional state systems and fraying civil societies, as well as blowback from George W. Bush's invasions.

President Obama's speeches were seen as the advent of a new era. However, Foreign Minister Ahmet Davutoğlu said that 2013 was the year that would shape relations between Turkey and the US over the coming decades. According to Davutoglu, Obama's responses to the breach of his red lines (Ghouta chemical attack) and acceptance of the coup in Egypt (2013 Egyptian coup d'état) worked for the narratives of extremists, encouraged atrocities, also signaled to our (NATO) adversaries that they can count on the US's inaction at places like Crimea (Russian occupation of Crimea).

At the end of the Obama administration, signs of strain emerged when Obama refused to hold a formal meeting with Erdoğan during the latter's visit to the United States in March 2016.

==== War on terror ====
The 2009 U.S. Secretary of State's Country Report on Terrorism confirmed that cooperation against terrorism is a key element in America's strategic partnership with Turkey, before going on to praise Turkish contributions to stabilize Iraq and Afghanistan and highlighting the strategic importance of the İncirlik Air Base used by both U.S. and NATO forces for operations in the region. Turkey had opposed the appointment of Anders Fogh Rasmussen as NATO secretary general due to his approach to the Muhammed carricaturs in Denmark until Obama assured a Turk would be one of Rasmussen deputies.

The U.S. Secretary of State's report also contained information on the PKK and other terrorist groups operating in Turkey, whom the U.S. and Turkish authorities share intelligence on, highlighting the September 12, 2006, attack on Diyarbakır and the July 27, 2008, attack on Güngören. In 2016, Vice President Joe Biden called the PKK a terrorist group "plain and simple" and compared it to the ISIL.

Terrorist attacks on US facilities

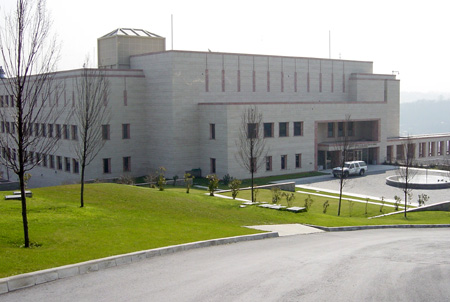
2008 United States consulate in Istanbul attack

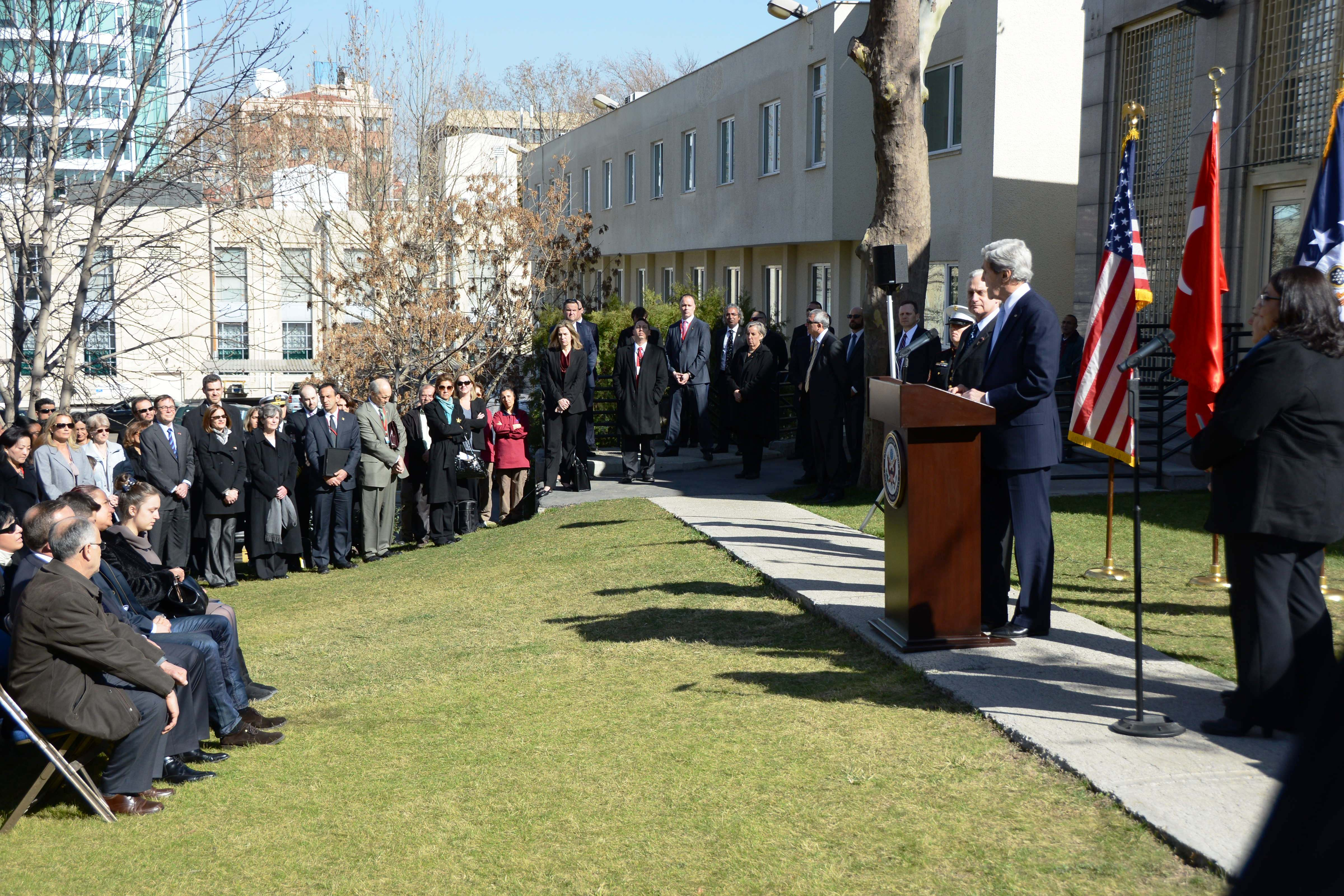
2013 United States embassy bombing in Ankara

==== Libya (Intervention) ====
Turkey was involved in the 2011 military intervention in Libya following the leadership of the Obama administration, American involvement in the 2011 Libyan Civil War. However, Turkey opposed the Obama-Sarkozy position. Turkey stated, "[This is] French interests over the Libyan people!" Another breakpoint with the Obama administration, Turkey cut ties with Gaddafi only after extending a hand to him and asking him to be exiled in Turkey in which he refused. Killing of Muammar Gaddafi occurred on October 20, 2011, after the Battle of Sirte.

Turkey and Operation Odyssey Dawn

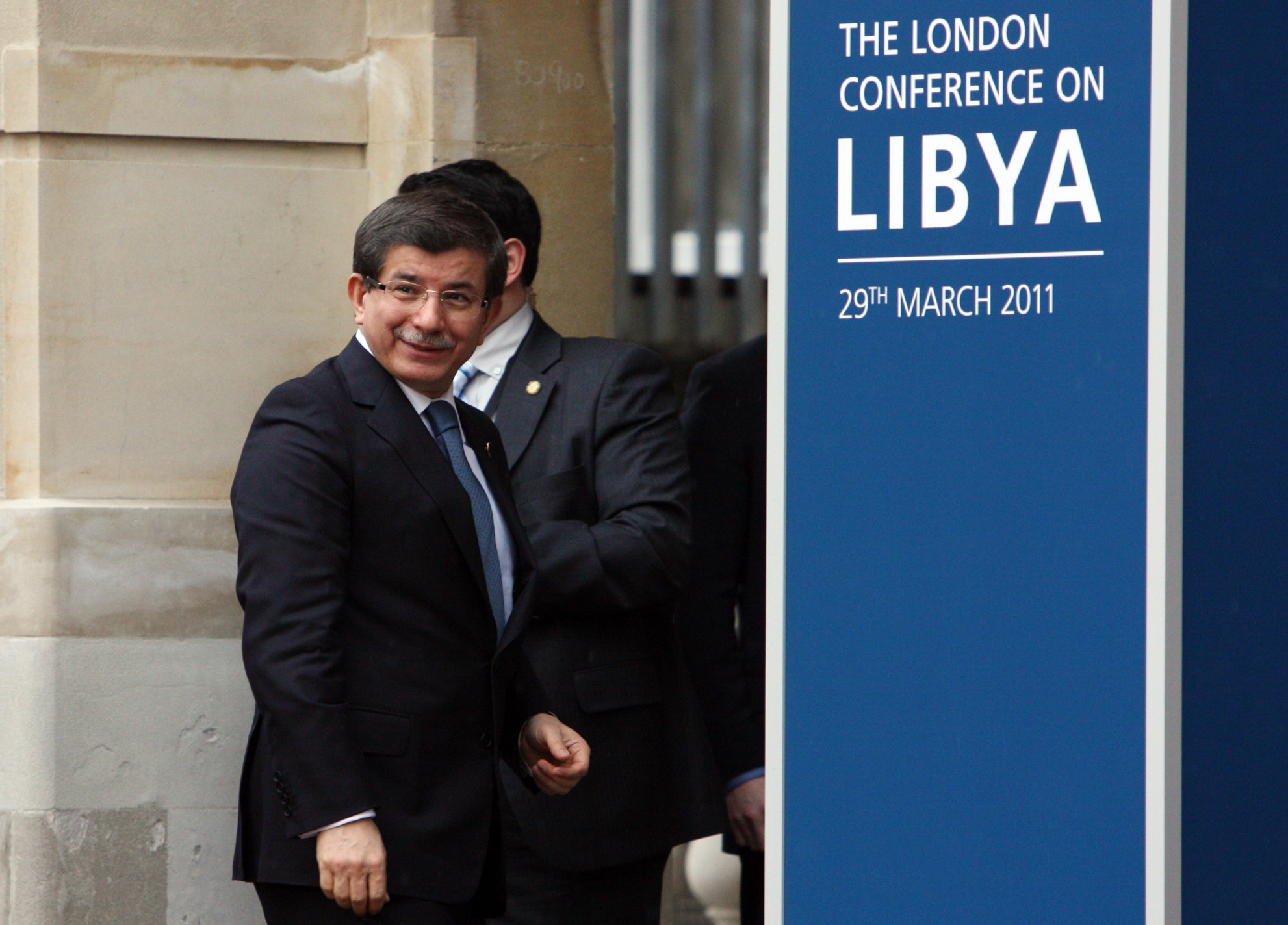
Davutoğlu, London Conference, Unified Protector

Libya showed Ankara's new policy toward the Arab Middle East: leading the world in dropping dictators in favor of the pro-democracy movements, from Egypt to Libya to Syria. Ankara moves closer to Washington.

==== Iran (nuclear deal, arms embargo, oil trading controversy) ====
In May 2009, after parliamentary debates in Belgium and Germany called for the removal of the nuclear weapons stationed in their military bases, questions were subsequently raised over the reportedly continuing presence of B61 nuclear bombs stationed at the Incirlik Air Base as part of NATO's nuclear sharing program. Bilkent University Professor Mustafa Kibaroğlu speculated that if the Obama administration had pressed for the withdrawal of these weapons, which Turkey wanted to keep, Turkey-U.S. relations could have been strained. In October 2009, President Obama sent a proposal (nuclear deal framework) to Erdoğan during the heated discussions in the U.S. on nuclear weapons in Turkey. However, before the completion of the framework, Turkish and Iranian diplomats were discussing a preliminary nuclear deal, which would be named the Tehran Declaration. In April 2010, while Turkish and Iranian diplomats were working on a deal, Washington stepped up its efforts to impose a new round of sanctions on Iran over its nuclear program (Comprehensive Iran Sanctions, Accountability, and Divestment Act of 2010). Iran agreed to the "Tehran Declaration" after China and Russia agreed to the prepared UN sanctions on Iran (described as a 'tactical move'). In May 2010, non-permanent members of the Security Council, Turkey and Brazil, announced the "Tehran Declaration." The Tehran Declaration was a fuel-swap deal. It stipulated that medical isotopes (a humanitarian need of Iran) could be produced by 20-percent-enriched nuclear fuel, which was to be provided to only one research reactor. The research reactor in question was the Tehran Research Reactor, which was supplied by the U.S. under the Atoms for Peace program. In exchange, Tehran would transfer 1,200 kilograms of low-enriched uranium to Turkey. On May 17, 2010, Brazil, Iran and Turkey signed a tripartite Joint Declaration asserting that a nuclear fuel exchange could lead to peace. The U.S. discarded the agreement because "it did not address the continued production of uranium enriched to 20 percent inside Iranian territory."

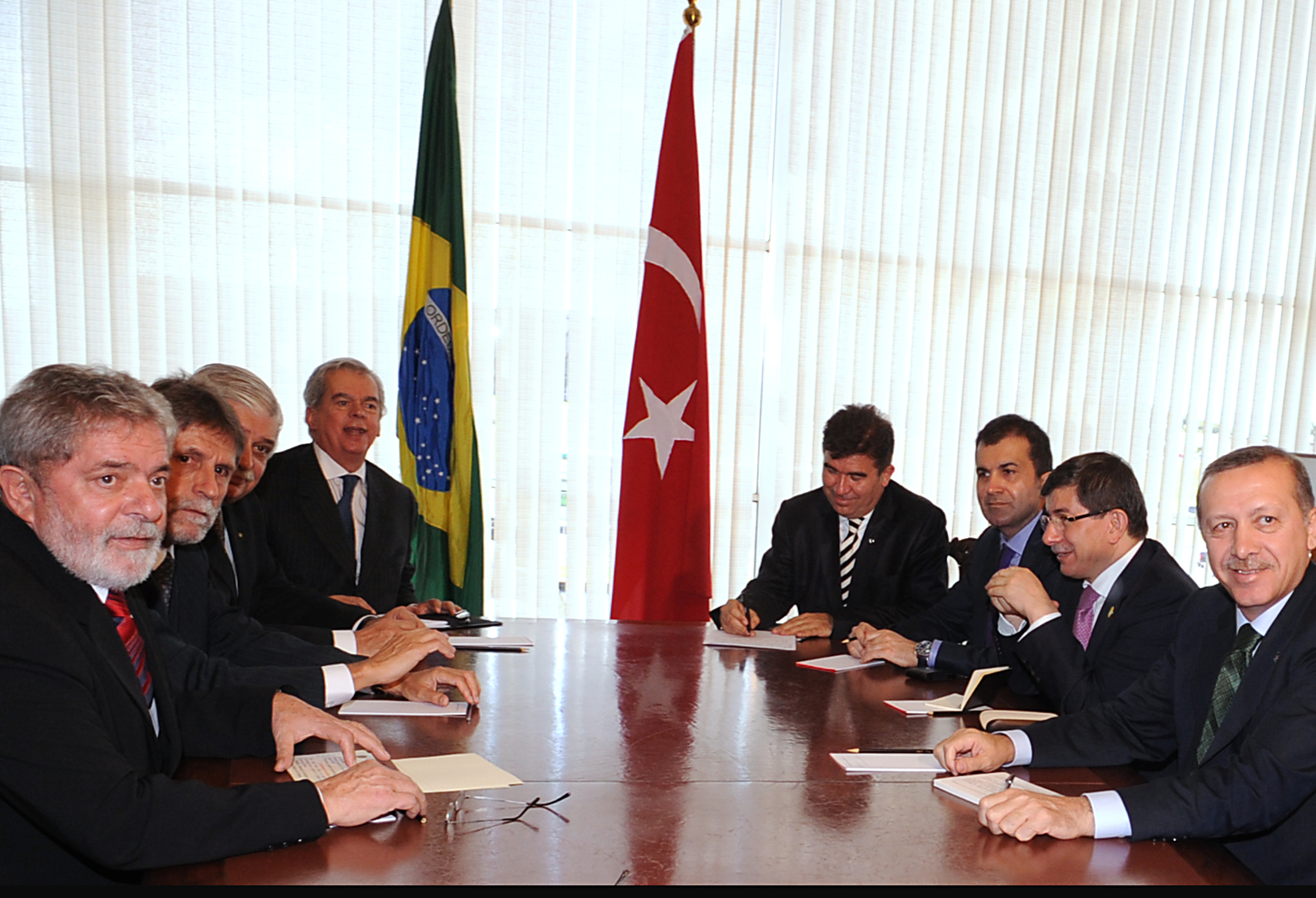
2010: Tehran Declaration, Turkey and Brazil.

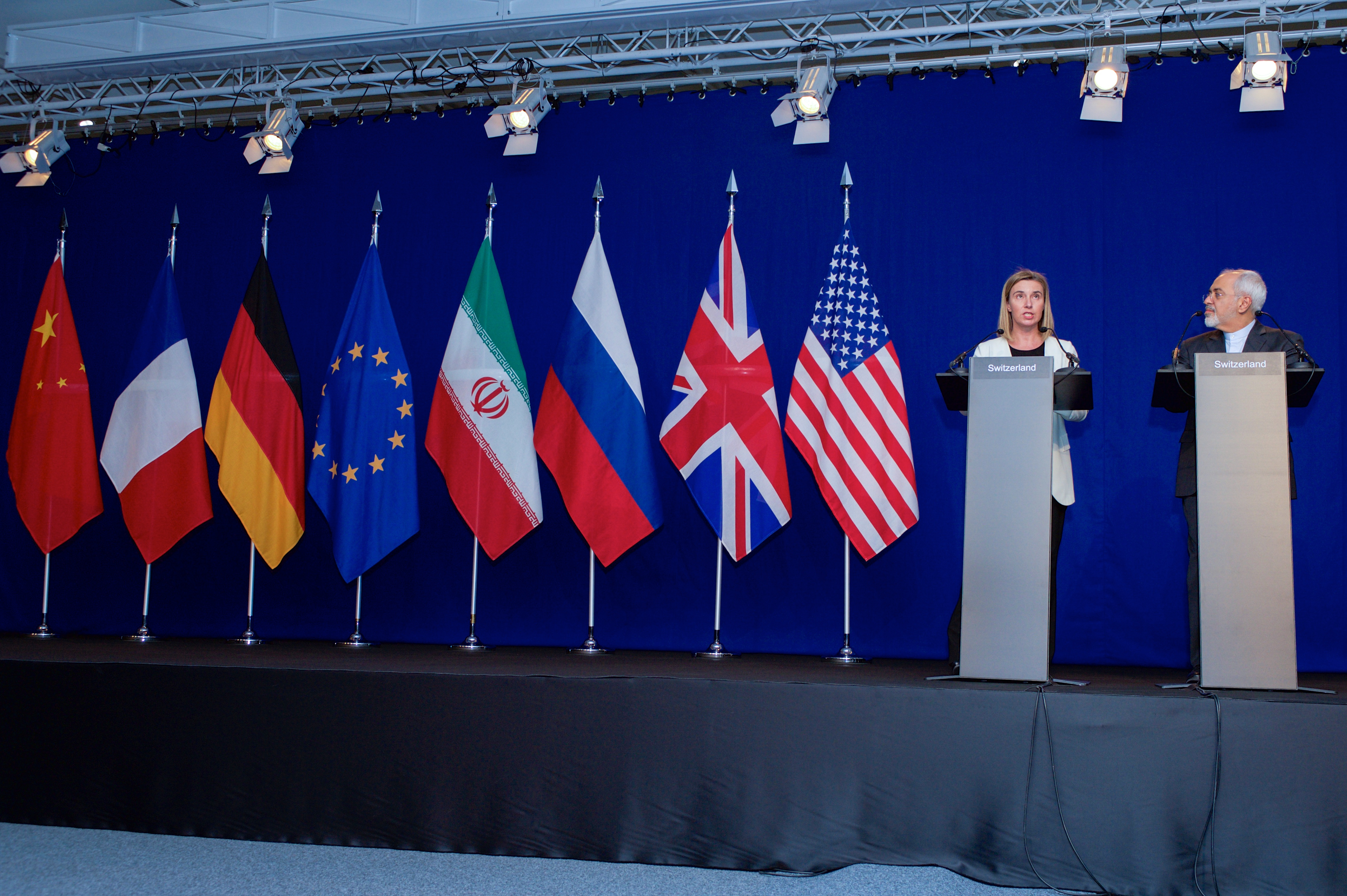
2015: the signing of INDF, 5 years after the "Tehran Declaration."

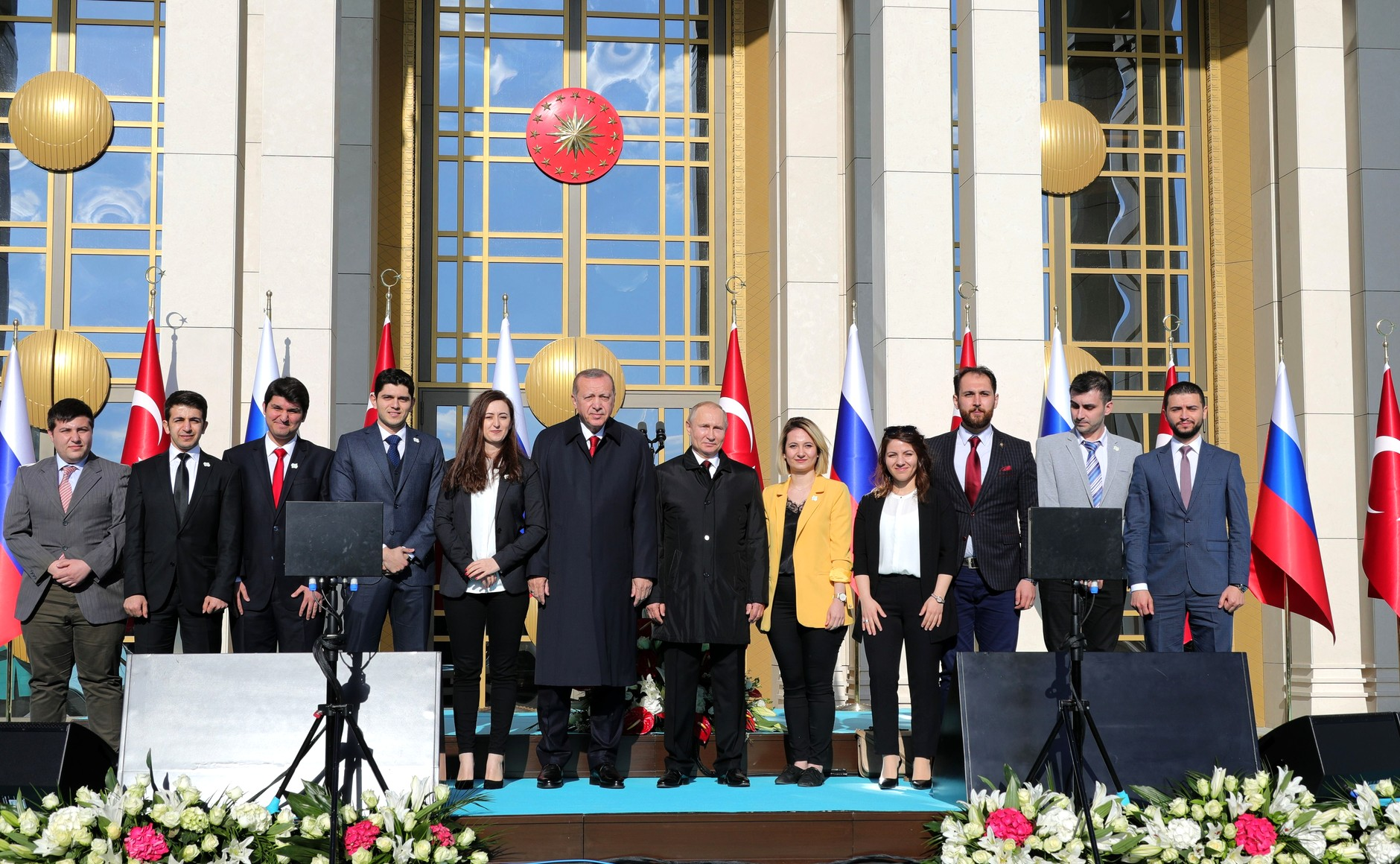
2018: Ground-breaking of the Akkuyu Nuclear Power Plant.

Atilla writs of certiorari Halk Bankasi

Turkey, India, and China opposed adopting a new round of sanctions, arguing the "Tehran Declaration" could be improved rather than discarded. Opposition in the U.S. condemned the move, with claims that Turkey is not in the Western camp. Turkey's objection to the U.S. sanctions resulted in the U.S. Congress delaying arms sales sought by the Turkish military. On August 17, 2010, a separate report presented to Obama by the U.S. Commission on International Religious Freedom, which had previously urged him to raise the subject of religious freedom during his 2009 presidential visit to Turkey, concluded that Turkey's interpretation of secularism "resulted in violations of religious freedoms for many of the country's citizens, including members of the majority and, especially, minority religious communities". Obama said that future arms sales would depend on Turkish policies.

After the discredited Tehran Declaration and sanctions on Turkey, progress stalled until Iran's change of government. Iranian President Hassan Rouhani signaled a change and opened the way for nuclear talks. On April 2, 2015, the Iran nuclear deal framework was signed five years after the Tehran Deal. Instead of the Turkey-Brazil initiative for the "Tehran Deal", the pact was signed between Iran and the P5+1 countries.

We urge both sides to continue their constructive approach, which aims to carry the process forward. Our hope is that both sides will carry out the mutually agreed steps on the agreement, therefore resolving this issue permanently in such a way that will satisfy all the sides involved through diplomacy.

— Turkish Foreign Ministry

Why were Turkey and Brazil involved in the Iranian Nuclear issues? The Turkish Energy, Nuclear and Mineral Research Agency managed nuclear power in Turkey. In putting together the fuel-swap deal, Turkey was trying to defend the autonomy of non-nuclear-weapon states (NNWS) to enrich uranium for producing electricity and strengthen the right of NNWS to develop peaceful nuclear activities. The Obama administration sanctioned Turkey, albeit for different reasons than Iran. In 2013, Russian nuclear construction company Atomstroyexport and Turkey signed a construction agreement for the "Akkuyu Nuclear Power Plant". Turkey did not face the same situation as Iran. The whole operation is Russian built, owned, and operated (build–own–operate) such that even the spent fuel (high-level waste) returned to Russia. Instead of the US partnering with Turkey, leaving Turkey to the Russia's help for the NNWS will affect Russia–Turkey relations by prolonging Turkey's dependence on Russian energy, beyond natural gas. It was a critical disconnect among NATO allies.

Before the November 2013 US-led nuclear sanctions, Halkbank purchased gold on the open market between March 2012 and July 2013. November 2013 sanctions prevented Iran from being paid in dollars, but the sanctions regime never mentioned gold. Halkbank exchanged gold for Iranian oil (oil trading controversy). October 18, 2015, the Joint Comprehensive Plan of Action canceled the sanctions in question. In March 2017, the deputy head Halkbank, Mehmet Hakan Atilla, was arrested by the US government for conspiring to evade sanctions against Iran by helping Reza Zarrab, an Iranian-Azeri businessman who had taken Turkish citizenship, "use U.S. financial institutions to engage in prohibited financial transactions that illegally funneled millions of dollars to Iran". Zarrab was in Miami, Florida, in March 2016. Atilla's trial commenced in New York City federal court in November 2017, with Zarrab agreeing to testify after reaching a plea deal with prosecutors. In early 2018, Atilla was convicted on five of six counts against him, including bank fraud and conspiracies and acquitted on one count after four days of jury deliberation.

==== Syria (Civil War, territorial integrity, safe zone, Rat Line, YPG) ====
Turkey was particularly cautious about a Kurdish state arising from a destabilized Syria. Turkey has fought an insurgent war against the PKK. Until 2011, Turkey's policy was to try to preserve a neutral but constructive position because civil war and sectarian conflicts would threaten Turkey's security. Eventually war broke and Syria (refugees, spillover) impacted Turkey more directly than other actors in the conflict.

Between 2011 and 2012, Turkey absorbed 120,000 Syrian refugees, 90,000 of whom were in camps. In September 2012, Turkey asked the US to establish a "safe zone" with Turkey in northern Syria to accommodate refugees and reduce the number of civilian casualties. Gen. Philip Breedlove to the United States Senate Committee on Armed Services said Syria was weaponizing migration. In 2015, U.S. senators called for humanitarian safe zones in Syria; the Obama administration declined. In 2016, during the European migrant crisis, Merkel asked the same question. Obama said Syrian safe zones won't work.

If we set up a no-fly zone or safe zones on the ground, we were buying a costly, dangerous, lengthy, and uncertain military commitment on top of Afghanistan and Iraq that put significant numbers of U.S. forces in harm's way. Could we have protected civilians in safe zones? Yes, had we deployed thousands of U.S. troops to take and hold the ground and committed roughly 100 planes to provide air coverage.

— Susan Rice (United States National Security Advisor), In Syria, America Had No Good Options, The Atlantic (October 7, 2019)

Erdoğan had good relations with Assad. Erdoğan had two telephone calls. On March 29, 2011, Erdoğan publicly urged Assad to announce reforms soon. Erdoğan told Obama that the U.S. should not pursue the removal of Assad due to the possibility of reforms, which he believed Assad could lead to a democratic transition. The U.S. imposed sanctions against the Syrian government in April 2011. Sanctions was followed by the E.O. 13573 targeting Assad on May 18, 2011. On June 20, Assad promised a national dialogue that would move toward reform, new parliamentary elections, and greater freedoms. Also, Syria urged Syrian refugees to return home from Turkey. After the U.S. Syrian sanctions regime in place, June 2011, Turkey halt joint economic and oil exploration projects with Syria. On August 18, 2011, Barack Obama issued a written statement that urged Assad to "step aside". Syria performed 2012 Syrian parliamentary election and 2012 Syrian constitutional referendum and a new Syrian Constitution of 2012. During 2012, the Syrian military also intensified its operations. Turkish missions in Syria were attacked. Erdoğan used the word "savagery" as refugees with military-inflicted wounds poured into Turkey. On 27 March 2013, Turkey followed the outcome of the 2013 Arab League summit to accept the Syrian opposition National Coalition for Syrian Revolutionary and Opposition Forces as the legitimate representatives of the Syrian people. Turkey continued indirect talks with Assad until the fall of the Assad regime during the Biden administration, which was after the 1st Trump Administration.

Early on, Obama saw Recep Tayyip Erdoğan, the president of Turkey, as the sort of moderate Muslim leader who would bridge the divide between East and West—but Obama now considers him a failure and an authoritarian, one who refuses to use his enormous army to bring stability to Syria.

— Jeffrey Goldberg, "The Obama Doctrine: The U.S. president talks through his hardest decisions about America's role in the world.", The Atlantic (April 2016)

Turkish involvement in the Syrian civil war

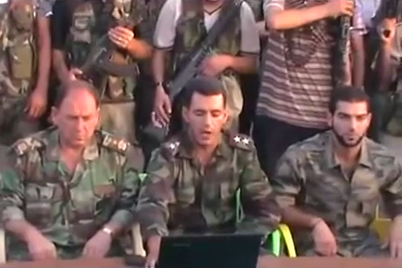
Opposition

Actors involved

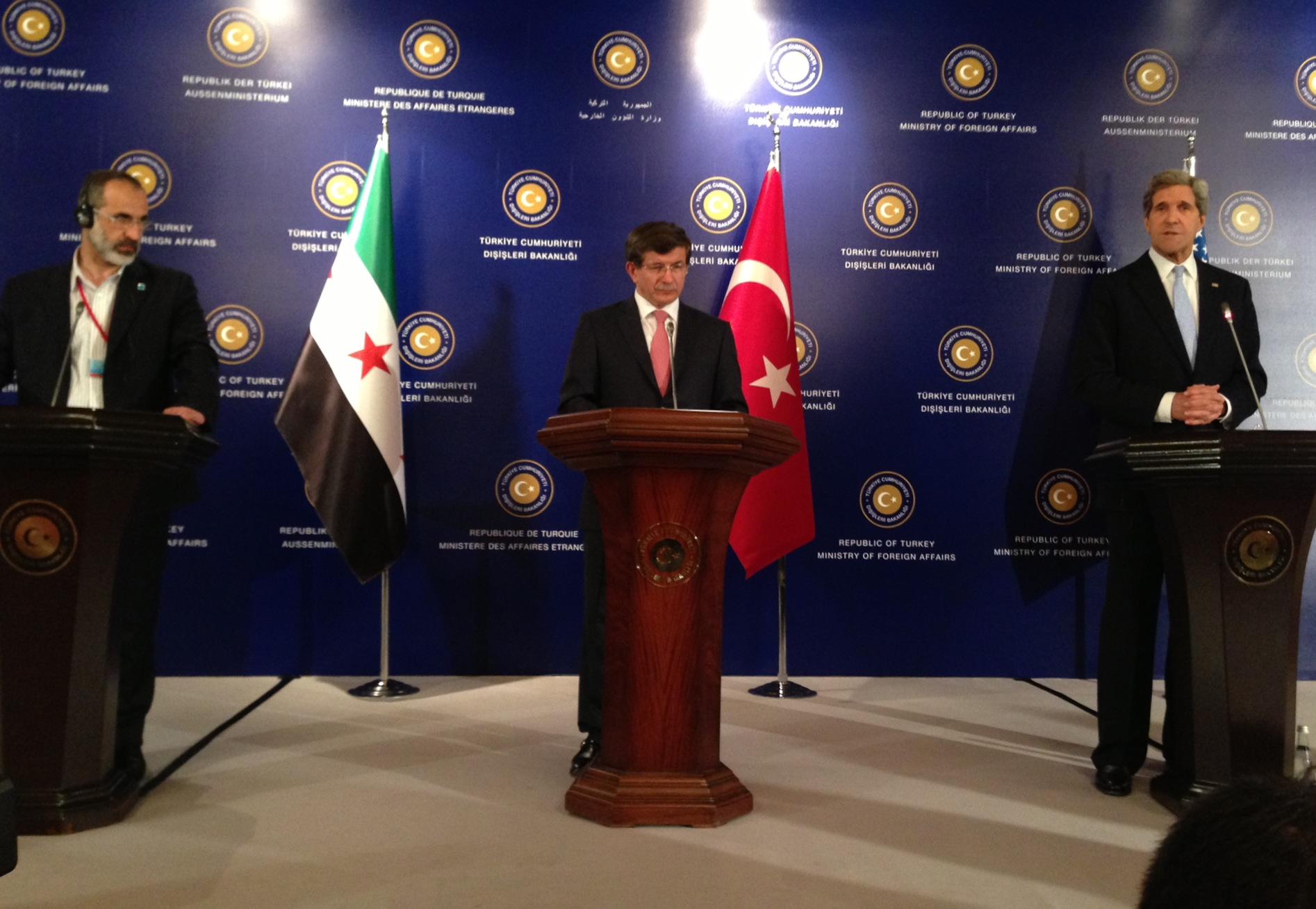
Train and Equip: Davutoğlu, Kerry, Moaz al-Khatib

CRS: Train and Equip.

In late 2012 or early 2013, Turkey and the United States began supporting the "Syrian opposition." Seymour Hersh reported that the CIA cooperated with Turkey in a covert operation named "the Rat Line." The Rat Line obtained and transported arms from Libya to rebel groups, later known as the Free Syrian Army (FSA). The CIA's involvement, or the operation, reportedly ended after the 2012 Benghazi attack, consequently leading to the mass evacuation of CIA operatives from the American consulate in Benghazi. In January 2014, the House Permanent Select Committee on Intelligence reported specifically on "the CIA annex at Benghazi", that "all CIA activities in Benghazi were legal and authorized. On-the-record testimony establishes that the CIA was not sending weapons ... from Libya to Syria, or facilitating other organizations or states that were transferring weapons from Libya to Syria." While the Obama administration investigated the Benghazi attack in January 2014, the National Intelligence Organisation scandal in Turkey broke out. In May 2014, the editor-in-chief of the Cumhuriyet Can Dündar published pictures of agents and trucks, and was later sentenced for ″leaking secret information of the state″. Timber Sycamore was a classified weapons supply, such as the Rat Line, and training program run by the CIA and supported by some Arab intelligence services, such as the security service in Saudi Arabia. It launched in 2012 or 2013 and funded, armed, and trained rebel forces. According to US officials, the program has trained thousands of rebels. The program was classified, but the U.S. Congress and the executive branch debated proposals for providing support to the Syrian opposition since 2011. In 2013. Gen. Dempsey told Congress, "I think [training is] the most effective,... The one that would produce an outcome that would be sustainable over time would be one where we empower ... that moderate group — assuming we can still find them in that mixture — to assist them in establishing security,..." In 2014, Congress provided Obama with authority and funds to overtly train and lethally equip vetted members of the Syrian opposition for select purposes, Syrian Train and Equip Program.

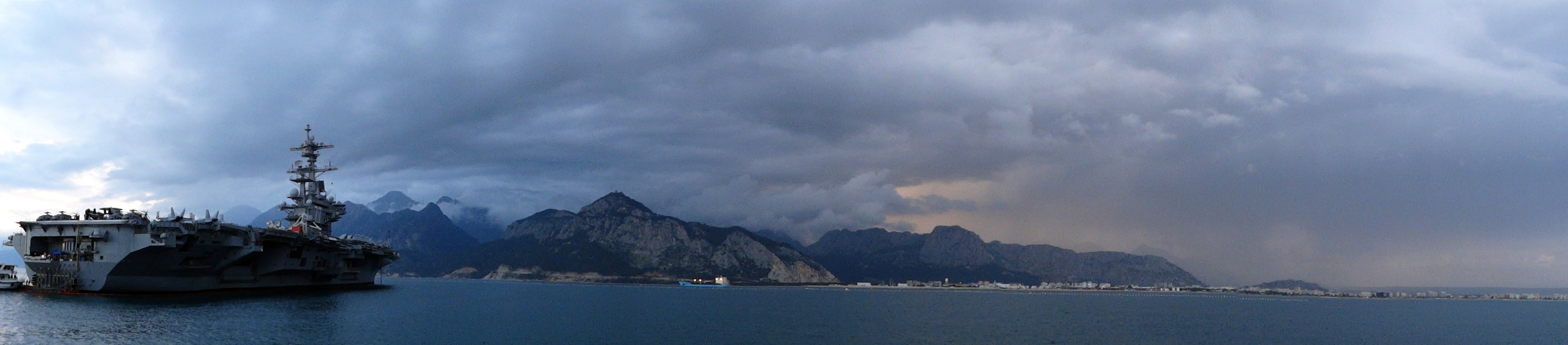
FM Davutoğlu: 2013 was the year that would shape relations. U.S. Navy Media Content Services published USS George H. W. Bush anchored during a port visit to Antalya in the Turkish Riviera, March 11, 2013.
Signs of Deterioration

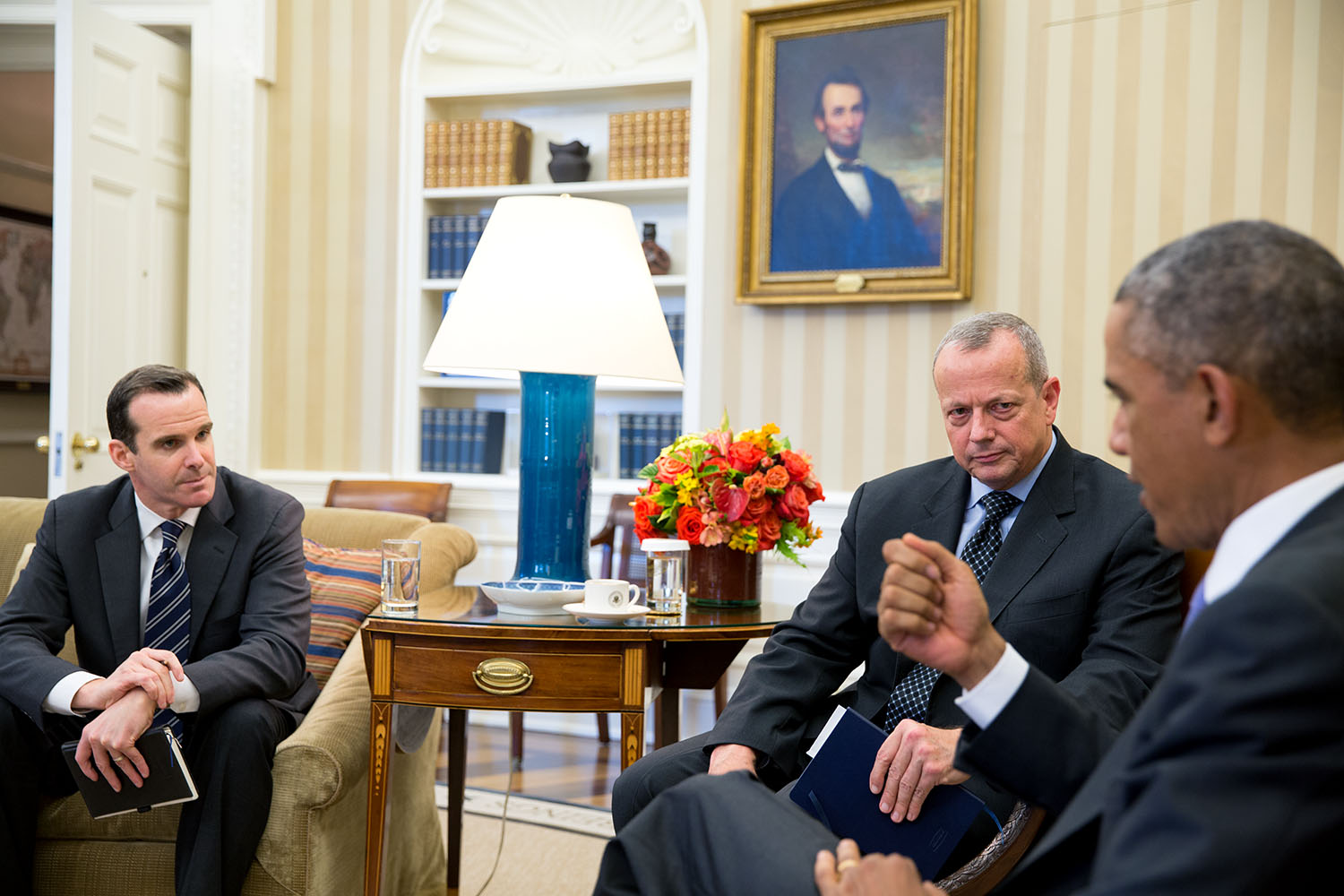
1914 Obama, Special Presidential Envoy for the Global Coalition to Counter ISIL Ret. Gen. Allen, and Deputy Special Presidential Envoy McGurk

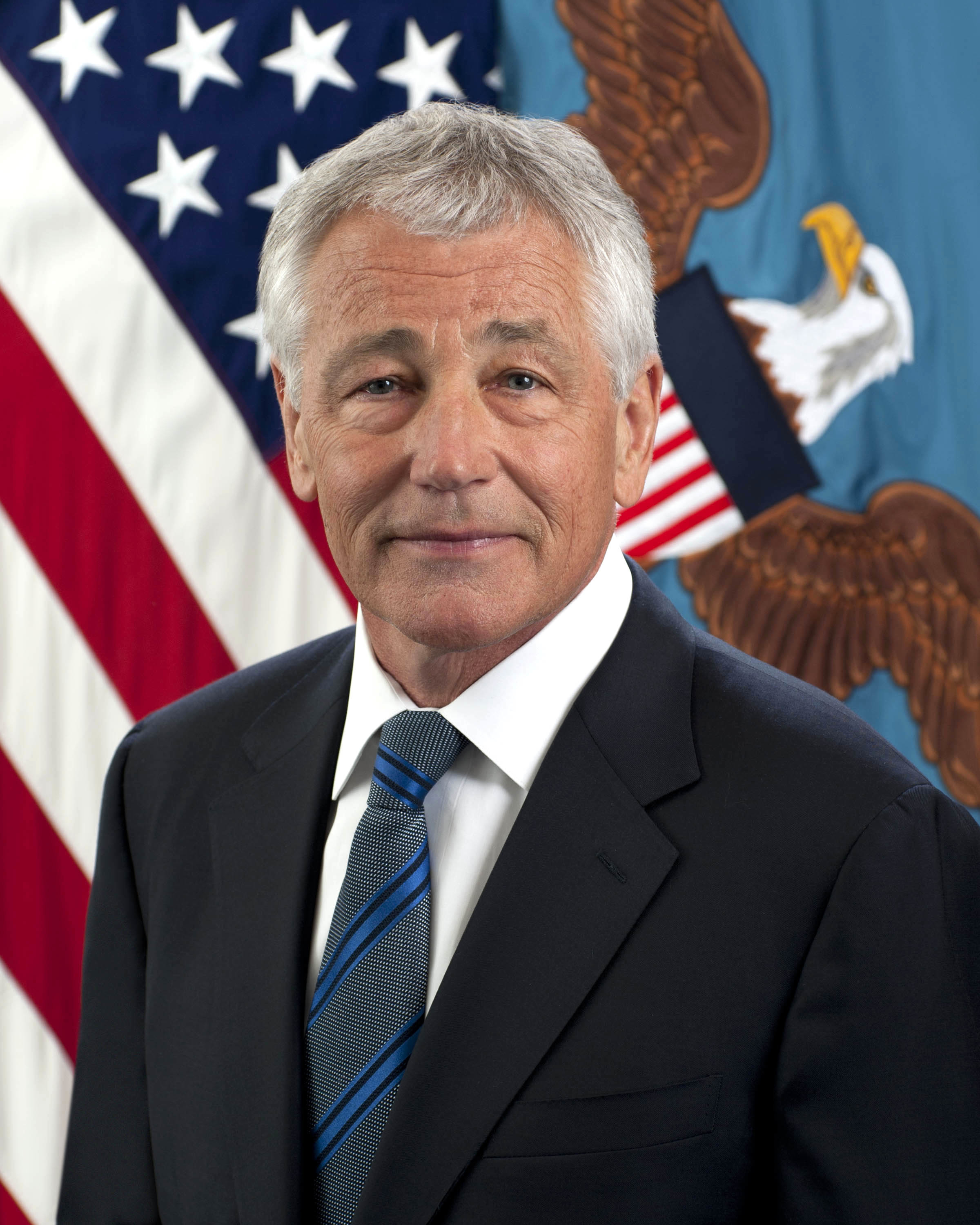
Hagel "Erdogan told me directly in 2014, ... we didn't listen to them, ...”

On August 20, 2012, Obama used the "Red line" in relation to chemical weapons. On the one-year anniversary of Obama's red line speech, August 21 Ghouta chemical attacks occurred. The U.S. Congress passed the authorization for the Use of Military Force Against the Government of Syria to Respond to Use of Chemical Weapons. Senator McCain said the red line was "apparently written in disappearing ink", due to the perception that the red line had been crossed with no action. At the same time, CENTCOM approached the YPG. This open communication, rather than an intelligence relationship, began in late 2014. McGurk officially visited Mustafa Khalil Abdi (Nom de guerre the General Mazlum Kobani, which was a derivative of Mazlum of Kobani) after the Siege of Kobanî. In response, Erdoğan said: "How can we trust you? Is it me that is your partner or is it the terrorists in Kobani?" After Kobani, General Allen and Brett McGurk worked on Tal Abyad. Turkey did not permit takeoff from a Turkish airbase. McGurk said: "So the picture that developed while General Allen and I were spending most of these months in Ankara is that something was not on the level [the U.S. allied with Turkey's enemy]." Turkey overtly defied American orders of ceasing Turkey's military bombardment of the YPG fighters in their bid to take the town of Azaz in northern Syria.

In other words, this illegitimate regime (stated position of Obama) was the source of these challenges and threats for Turkey, yet the Obama administration was unwilling to recognize it as such and act upon it accordingly. On the contrary, at the end of the day, the Obama administration allowed Assad's brutality to continue while supporting "his ally" Turkey's foes, on the ground.

— FM, "From Obama to Trump: Lessons and challenges", Al Jazeera English (February 3, 2017)

Turkey-US relations began showing the "signs of deterioration", particularly over the handling of the YPG. In October 2014, VP Biden accused Turkey of funding al-Nusra and al Qaeda (FSA-identified groups), to which Erdoğan angrily responded, "Biden has to apologize for his statements" adding that if no apology is made, Biden would become "history to [him]". Biden subsequently apologized. Regarding the Biden's reference to Syrian Train and Equip Program, which Turkey was part, Trump's APNSA McMaster of and D/CIA Pompeo decided to terminate the program in July 2017. While claiming Turkey for supporting al Qaeda, Obama approaced one of the groups that held the idea of "Syrian Balkanization" ("division of the country") in which they promoted federalizing Syria on ethnic and religious-sectarian lines, Constitution of the Autonomous Administration of North and East Syria. The American forces in the Syrian Civil War openly allied with the YPG and supported them militarily. The YPG was criticized by Turkey for its alleged support to the PKK, especially since a rebellion in southern Turkey began in 2015. Hagel: "We've got a problem with the Turks because we didn't listen to them. He told me directly in 2014, fall 2014, 'Mr. Secretary, ISIS is not our No. 1 threat. They're a problem. The Kurds [referring to PKK] have been and will continue to be until we win." By early 2015, voices in the US foreign policy establishment pushed to abandon the rebels.

2014 Policy Approaches to Syria
| | Peres | Obama | Erdoğan |
|---|---|---|---|
| Strategy | Prevent/Distrupt hostile or heavily armed regimes | Prevent/Distrupt Terrorism | Prevent/Distrupt Terrorism, uncontrolled migration |
| Goal | Balkanization with a Kurdish statehood. | | Unified, stable, and sovereign |
| Method | Non-intervention (no IDF, through proxies) and tactical deconfliction through the U.S. | Ease out Opposition (extremists). Increase support to YPG | Increase support to Opposition |

In early October 2015, shortly after the start of the Russian military intervention in Syria, Obama was reported to have authorized the resupply of 25,000 YPG militia. Erdoğan stated that he had asked Obama not to intervene on the side of the YPG: "I told Mr. Obama, 'Don't drop those bombs [meaning weapons and other supplies]. You will be making a mistake.' Unfortunately, despite our conversation, they dropped whatever was needed with three C-130's and half of it landed in [IS'] hands. So who is supplying [ISIL], then?" Erdogan also opposed any arrangements in Syria that would mirror the Iraqi Kurds' de facto state in northern Syria. He told reporters on January 26, 2015: "What is this? Northern Iraq? Now [they want] Northern Syria to be born. It is impossible for us to accept this. ... Such entities will cause great problems in the future."

American intervention in the Syrian civil war

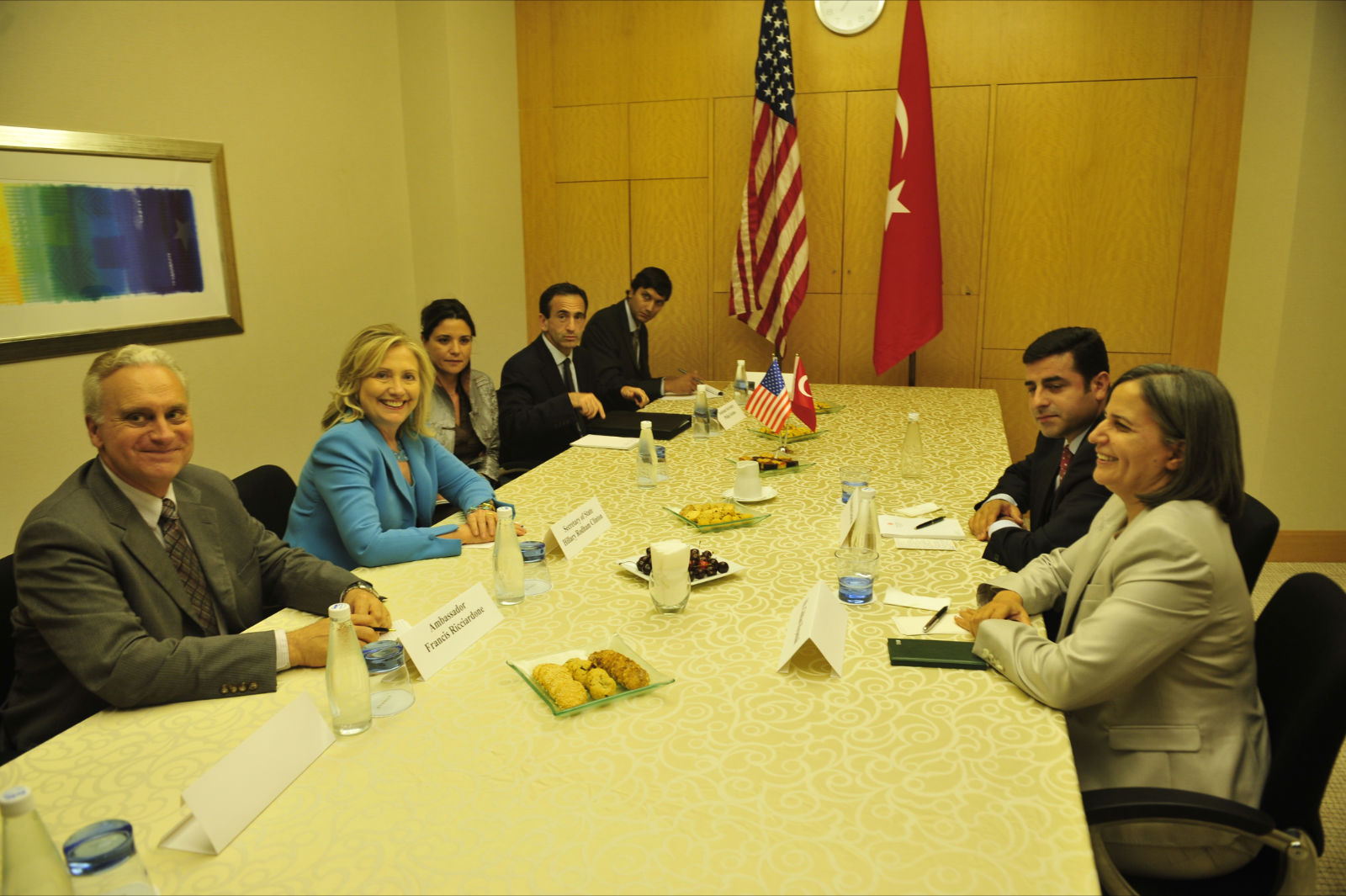
2011: Hillary Clinton meets with Selahattin Demirtaş

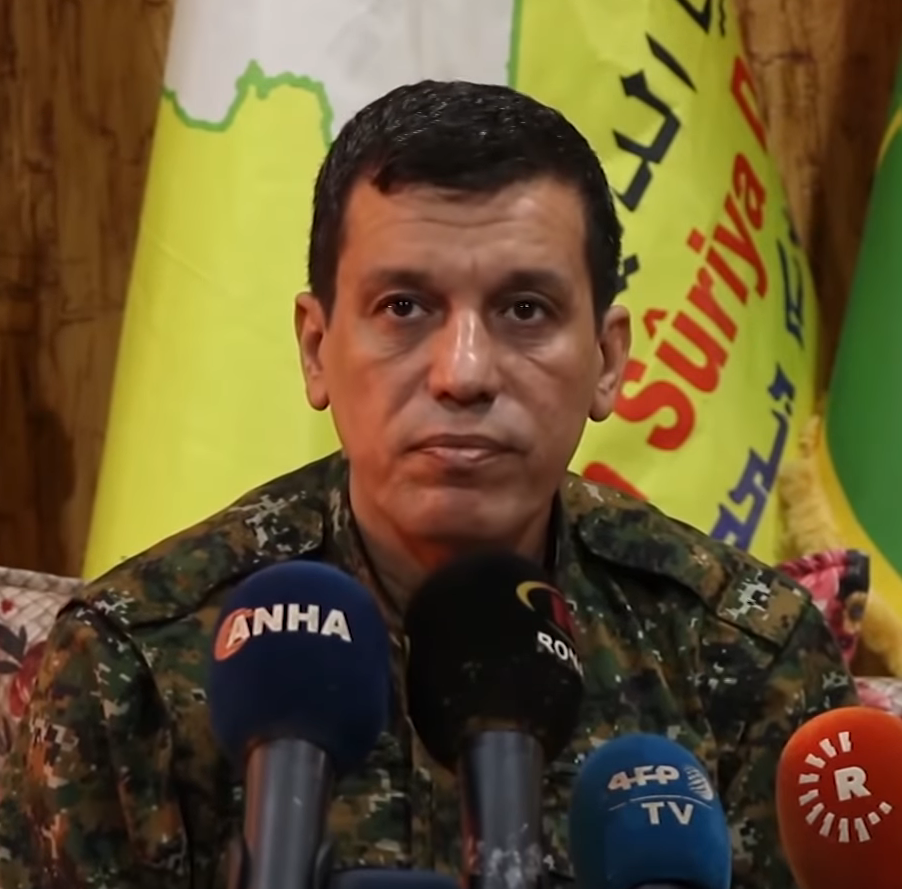
YPG-SDF Mazloum Abdi

November 2015, Obama in Antalya on countering ISIL

December, 2015: Obama on Syrian Civil War

The head of the USSOCOM General Thomas told at the Aspen Security Forum, in July 2017, that the SDF (established October 10, 2015) was a PR-friendly name for the YPG, which Thomas personally suggested because the YPG was considered an arm of the PKK. In summary, during the Obama years, Turkey developed its policy towards Syria in two stages. The first stage was by itself. The second stage involved the US and was unsuccessful. However, during obama years, Turkey was unwilling to act unilaterally toward Syria.

1. Tried to persuade Assad to reform (2011-2013). Cut diplomatic ties (March 2013). Supported regional and international political solutions. Supported and aided Syria's political and armed opposition (2012-2024).
2. Asked Obama to support direct military intervention, such as a no-fly zone or humanitarian corridor for the refugees. Obama administration rejected.

In summary, during the Obama years, the Obama administration did not respond to the idea that the Rojava conflict, which the Obama administration associated itself with, provided a launch pad for Turkish Kurdish separatists toward Turkey and might raise questions about Turkey's territorial integrity.

==== Palestine (Gaza flotilla raid) ====
2014 Gaza War

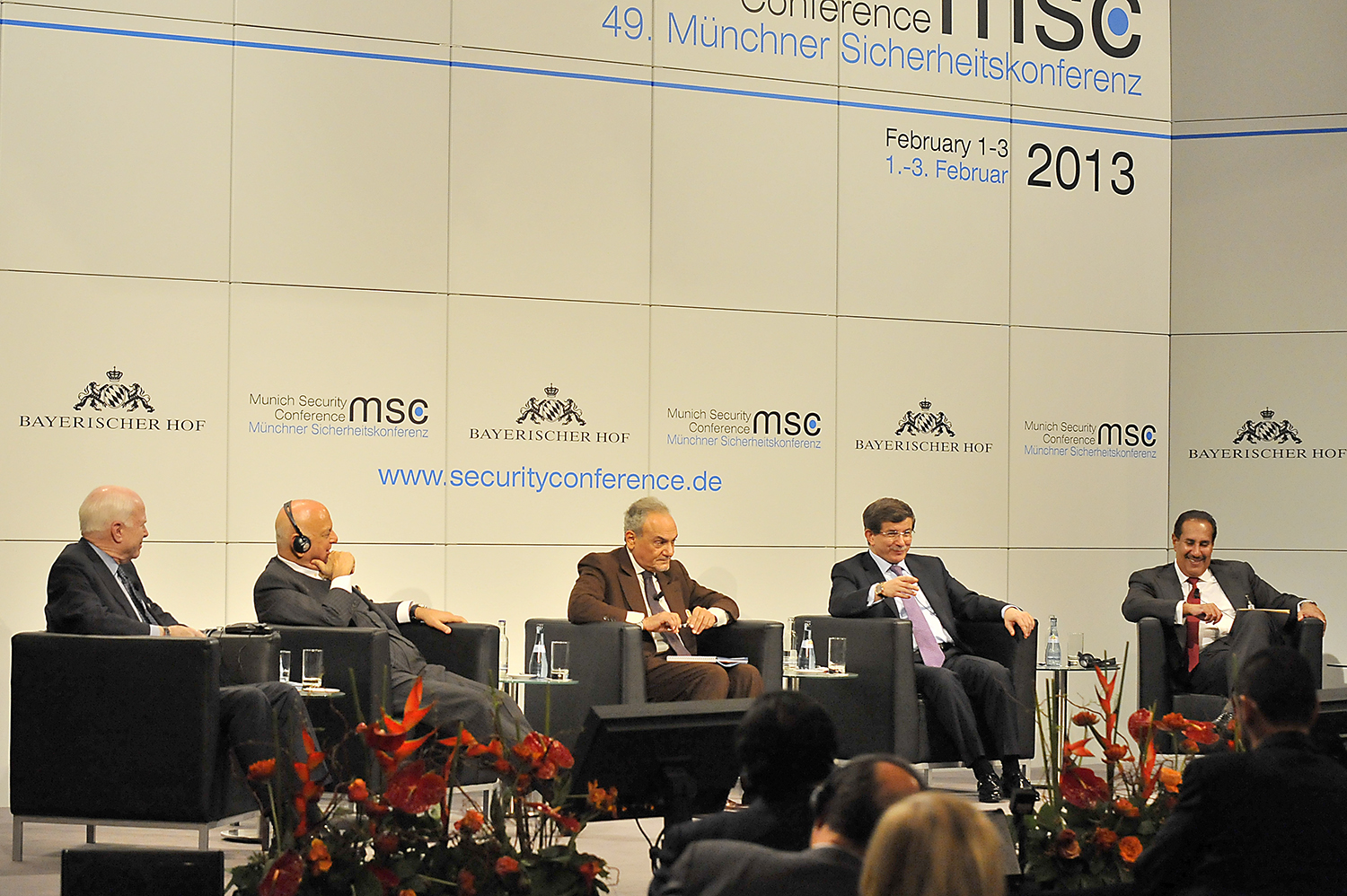
2013 Munich: McCain and Davutoğlu at Security Conference debating the future of the Middle East

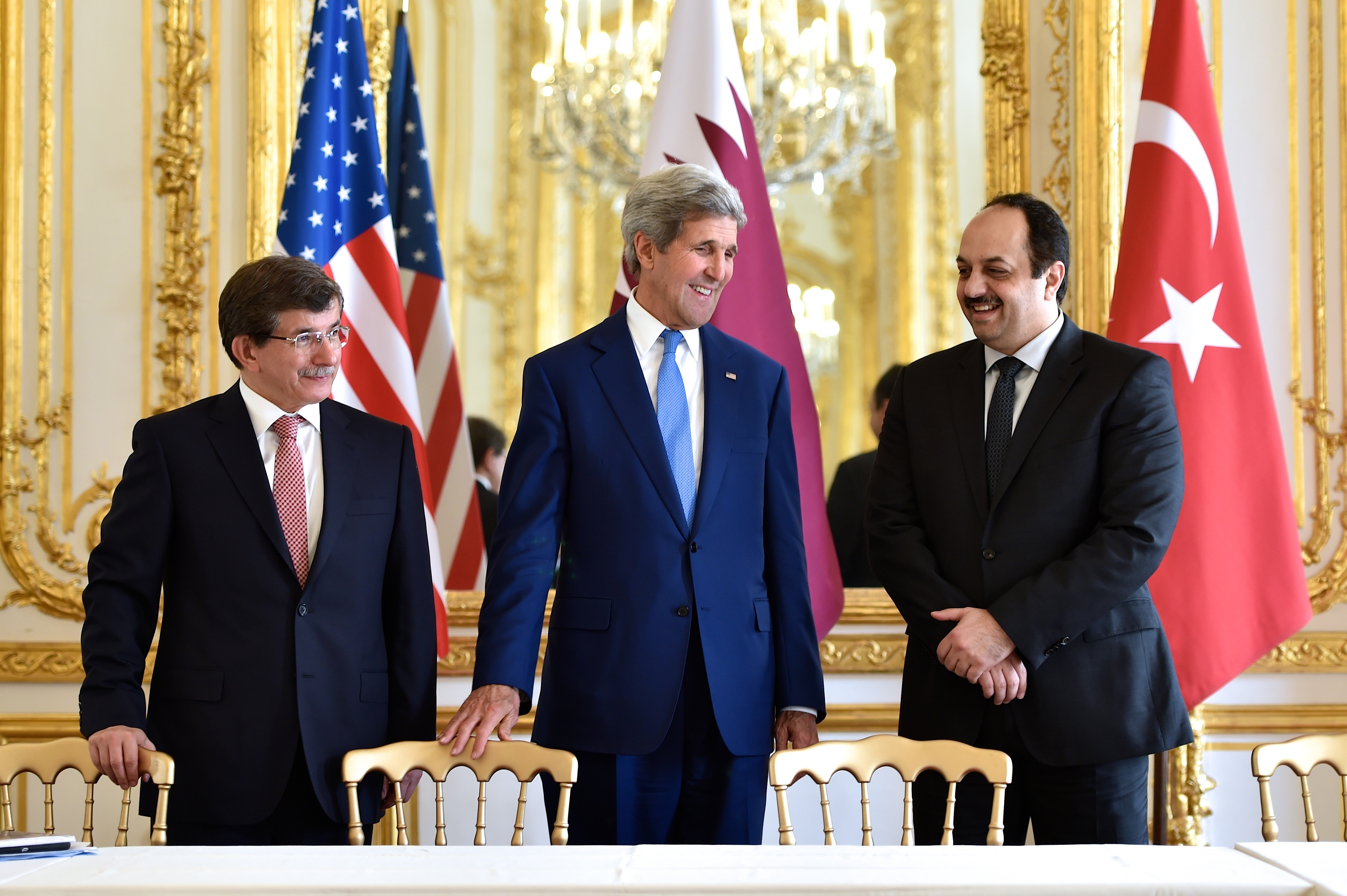
2014 Paris: Davutoğlu, John Kerry and Khalid al-Attiyah discussing Israel–Hamas ceasefire deal

The Gaza flotilla raid was a military operation by Israel against six civilian ships of the "Gaza Freedom Flotilla" on May 31, 2010, in international waters in the Mediterranean Sea. Israel–Turkey relations reached a low point after the incident. Turkey recalled its ambassador, canceled joint military exercises, and called for an emergency UN Security Council meeting. Erdoğan harshly referred to the raid as a "bloody massacre" and "state terrorism", and criticized Israel in a speech before the Grand National Assembly. After Israel's military action, Turkish-Israeli relations have reached a low. Turkish Prime Minister Erdoğan accused Israel of 'state terrorism' and predicted in a speech to party members: 'From today on, nothing is anymore as it used to be.' He distanced himself clearly from antisemitic tones.

On March 22, 2013, Netanyahu apologized for the incident in a 30-minute telephone call with Erdoğan, saying the results were unintended; the Turkish prime minister agreed to enter discussions to resolve the compensation issue. White House stated Erdoğan accepted the apology. The call took place at the airport as Obama was taking off, and at one point Obama jumped in to facilitate the peace. The issue again came up during 2013 Erdoğan visit. Obama's position was one of regret over the killing but not condemnation of Israel. It was stated that Obama had a "cautious, diplomatic response".

==== Armenia (Genocide, Normalization) ====
During his Ankara visit, Obama urged Turkey to come to terms with its past and resolve its Armenian issues. During the 2008 US presidential election, he had criticized former US President George W. Bush for his failure to take a stance and stated that the "Armenian genocide is not an allegation, a personal opinion, or a point of view, but rather a widely documented fact supported by an overwhelming body of historical evidence". He responded positively to an announcement from sources in Ankara and Yerevan that a deal to reopen the border between the two states and exchange diplomatic personnel would happen, and indicated that although his own personal views on the subject remained unchanged, to avoid derailing this diplomatic progress, he would refrain from using the word "genocide" in his upcoming April 24 speech on the question.

On April 22, 2009, shortly after Obama's visit, Turkish and Armenian authorities formally announced a provisional roadmap for the normalization of diplomatic ties between the two states. The U.S. responded positively with a statement from the office of U.S. Vice President Joe Biden following a phone conversation with Armenian President Serzh Sargsyan, which stated that "the Vice President applauded President Sargsyan's leadership, and underscored the administration's support for both Armenia and Turkey in this process". Turkish columnists, however, criticized the timing of the announcement, and believed it to have been made to placate Obama in advance of his April 24 speech, with Fikret Bila writing in the Milliyet that "the Turkish Foreign Ministry made this statement regarding the roadmap before midnight", as it would allow Obama to go back on his campaign promise to refer to the incident as genocide, which the Turkish government profusely denied, by pointing out to the Armenian diaspora that "Turkey reached a consensus with Armenia and set a roadmap" and "there is no need now to damage this process".

==== Arab Spring (Turkish model, Gazi Park) ====
Turkish model

Arab Spring

Gezi Park and the Turkish model

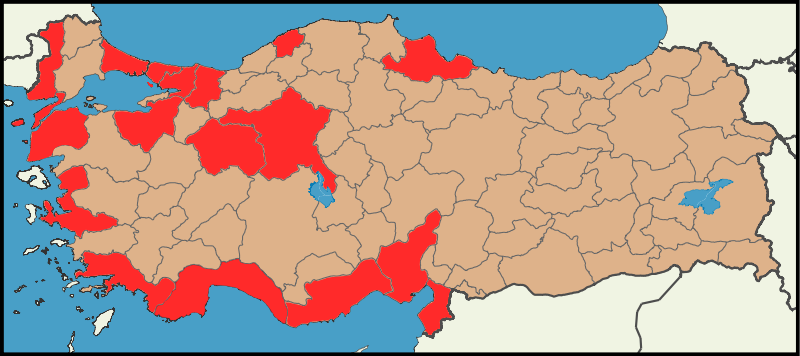
Gezi Park protests

Turkish model refers to the idea of Turkey as a potential model for other Muslim-majority countries, particularly in the Middle East, combining a democratic government (Secularism in Turkey) with an Islamic identity (Conservatism in Turkey). Respectively represented by Atatürk's reforms and Erdogan's Justice and Development Party (Turkey). Particularly early on Obama administration, there was some discussion and hope that Turkey could serve as a positive example of a modern, democratic, and predominantly Muslim nation.

Hugh Pope—The Wall Street Journal — wrote that “crowns the rediscovery of the strategic value of Turkey” after Prime Minister Bülent Ecevit's 2002 Washington visite which showcased Turkey's laicism as an effective way to combat Islamic radicalism. In the Obama period, opposing side argued that the independence of the media (does Turkish media represent all groups?), judiciary (does Turkey have an independent judiciary?), and army (does Turkey have a professional army?). However, despite these questions, the Egyptian Muslim Brotherhood's rejection of the Turkish model revealed the limits of secularism's regional influence.

The Arab Spring was a series of anti-government protests, uprisings, and armed rebellions that spread across much of the Arab world in the early 2010s, resulting in the Arab Winter. Amb. Jeffrey stated that Turkey at a crossroads after the Gezi Park Protests (2013), and asked what do the Gezi Park Protests mean for democracy in the region? Failure of the Turkish model in the American point of view during Obama years, as Center for American Progress summary points out, was Turkey's relationship with the American-ally Kurdish militia, YPG, (Turkey's nomenclature PKK subsidiary group), or "Lack thereof."

==== Gülen movement (coup d'état attempt) ====
The AKP–Gülen movement conflict is a major Turkey–United States relations. In the evening of July 15, 2016, a fraction attempted a coup d'état, 2016 Turkish coup attempt, in Turkey.

U.S. on the 2016 Turkish coup attempt

Obama to Erdogan: "U.S. had no advance knowledge of last week's failed coup attempt in Turkey"

Press Briefing on the attempt (start=45:40)

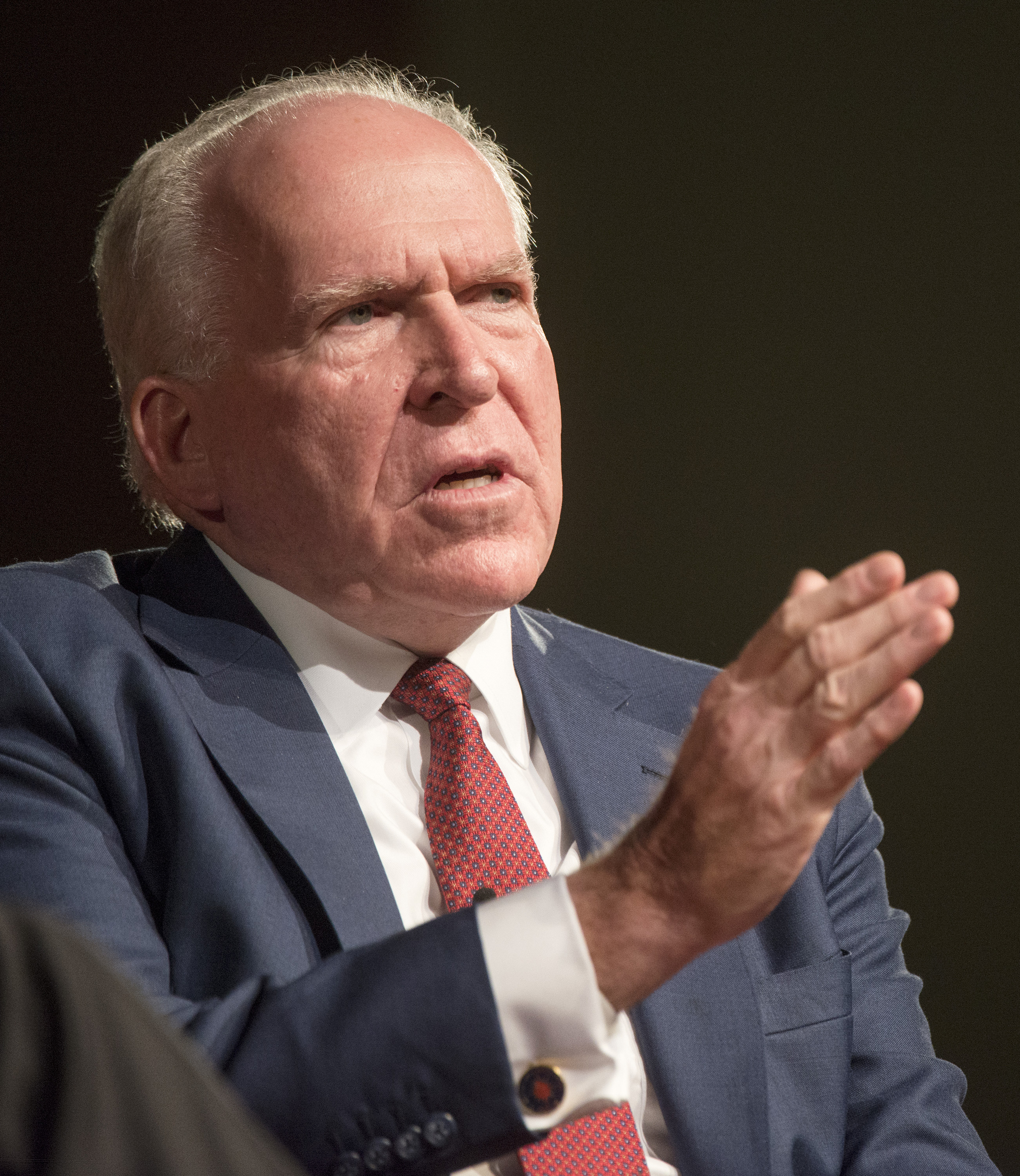
Brennan (CIA): "Officials were well aware of sizable opposition"

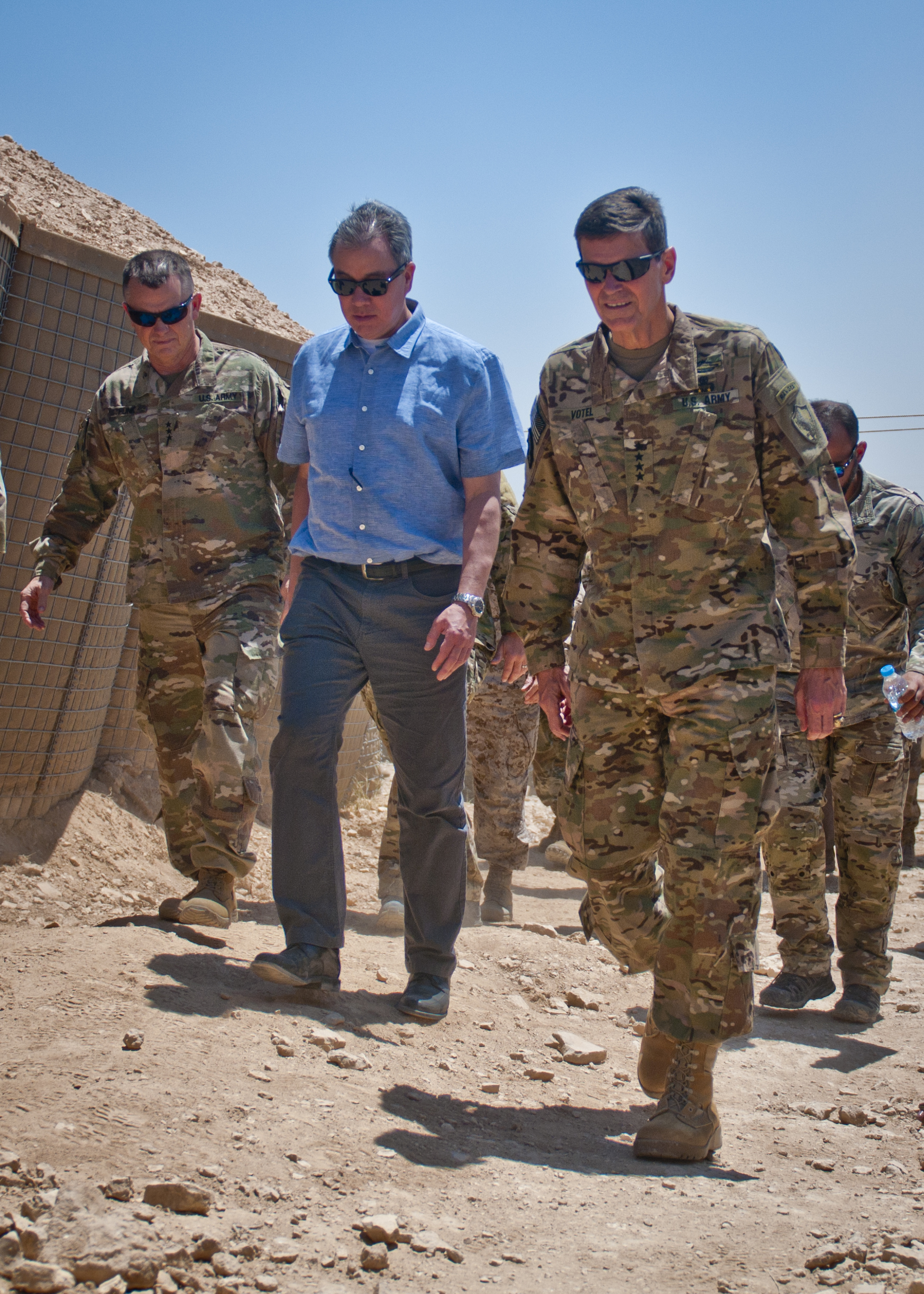
Votel (CENTCOM): "Turkish government arresting the Pentagon's contacts".

In a speech on July 29, 2016, President Erdoğan accused CENTCOM chief Joseph Votel of "siding with coup plotters" after Votel accused the Turkish government of arresting the Pentagon's contacts in Turkey. In late July 2016, Turkish prime minister Binali Yıldırım told The Guardian: "Of course, since the leader of this terrorist organisation is residing in the United States, there are question marks in the minds of the people whether there is any U.S. involvement or backing.

State of affairs

2015: U.S. policy and strategy (Turkey)

February 3, 2016: (162 days before) Politics, deposition of Gönül Tol, Middle East Institute

July 13, 2016: (2 days before) Politics, deposition of Fevzi Bilgin, Rethink Institute

September 14, 2016: (60 days after) The coup d'état attempt, deposition of Ahmet S. Yayla

December 9, 2016: (147 days after) Human rights, deposition of Alp Aslandogan, Alliance for Shared Values

Turkey's Anadolu Agency report chief prosecutor's office launched an investigation into 17 U.S.-based individuals, including Senate Democratic Leader Chuck Schumer, former U.S. Attorney Preet Bharara and ex-CIA director John Brennan, for their alleged links to cleric Fethullah Gulen. Yeni Şafak, a Turkish pro-government newspaper, claimed that the former commander of NATO forces in Afghanistan, now-retired U.S. Army General John F. Campbell, was the "mastermind" behind the coup attempt in Turkey.

=== First Trump administration (2017–2021) ===
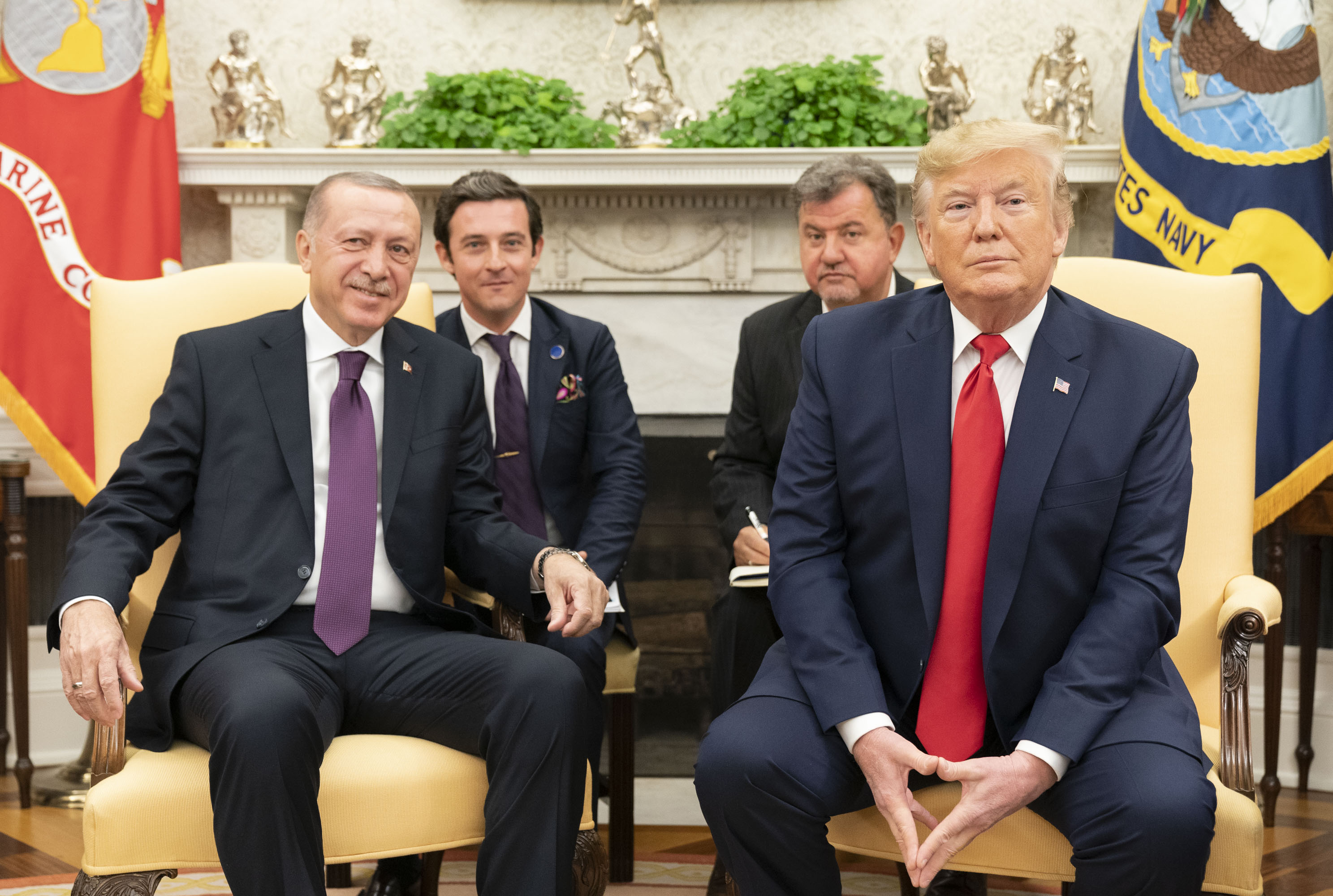
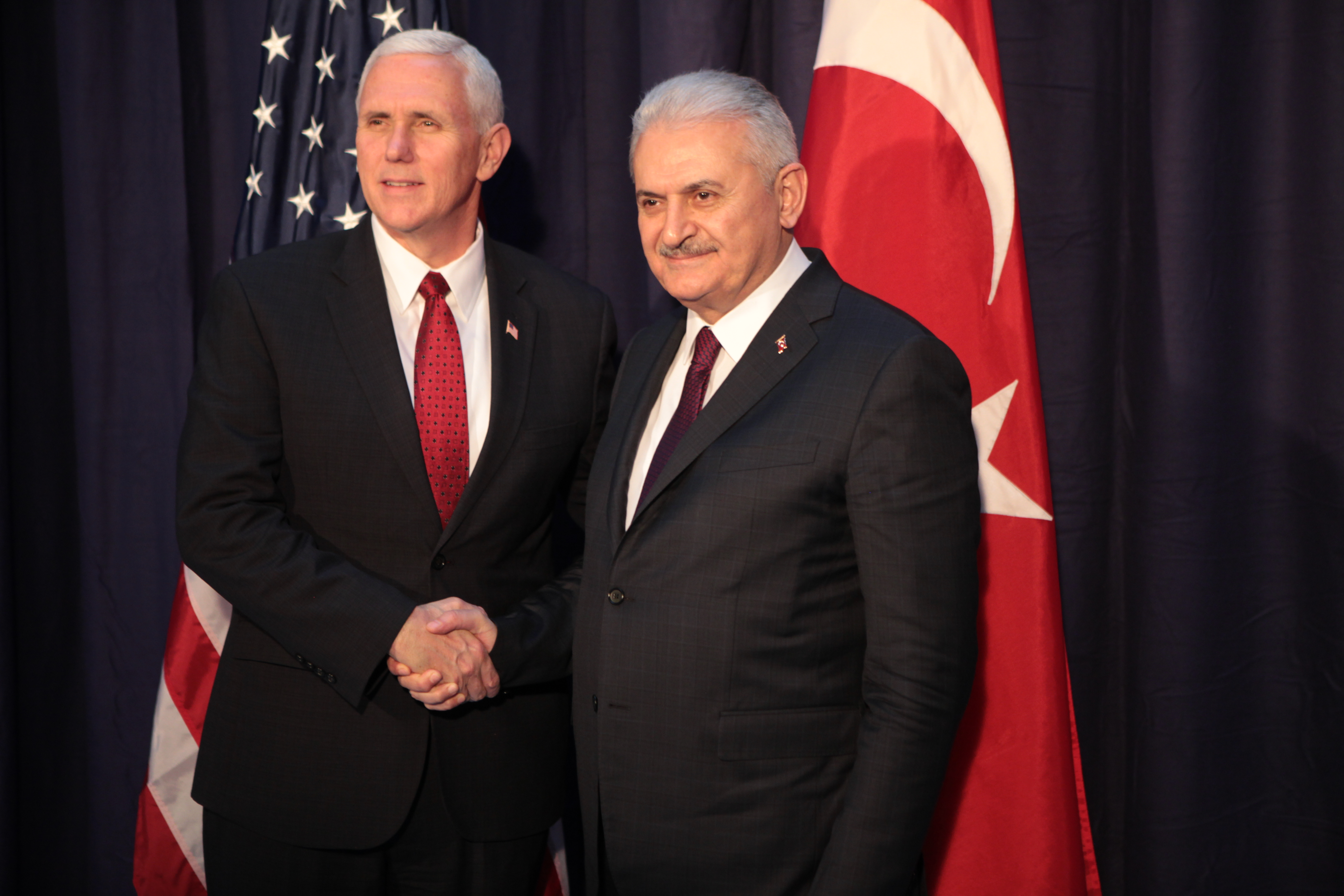
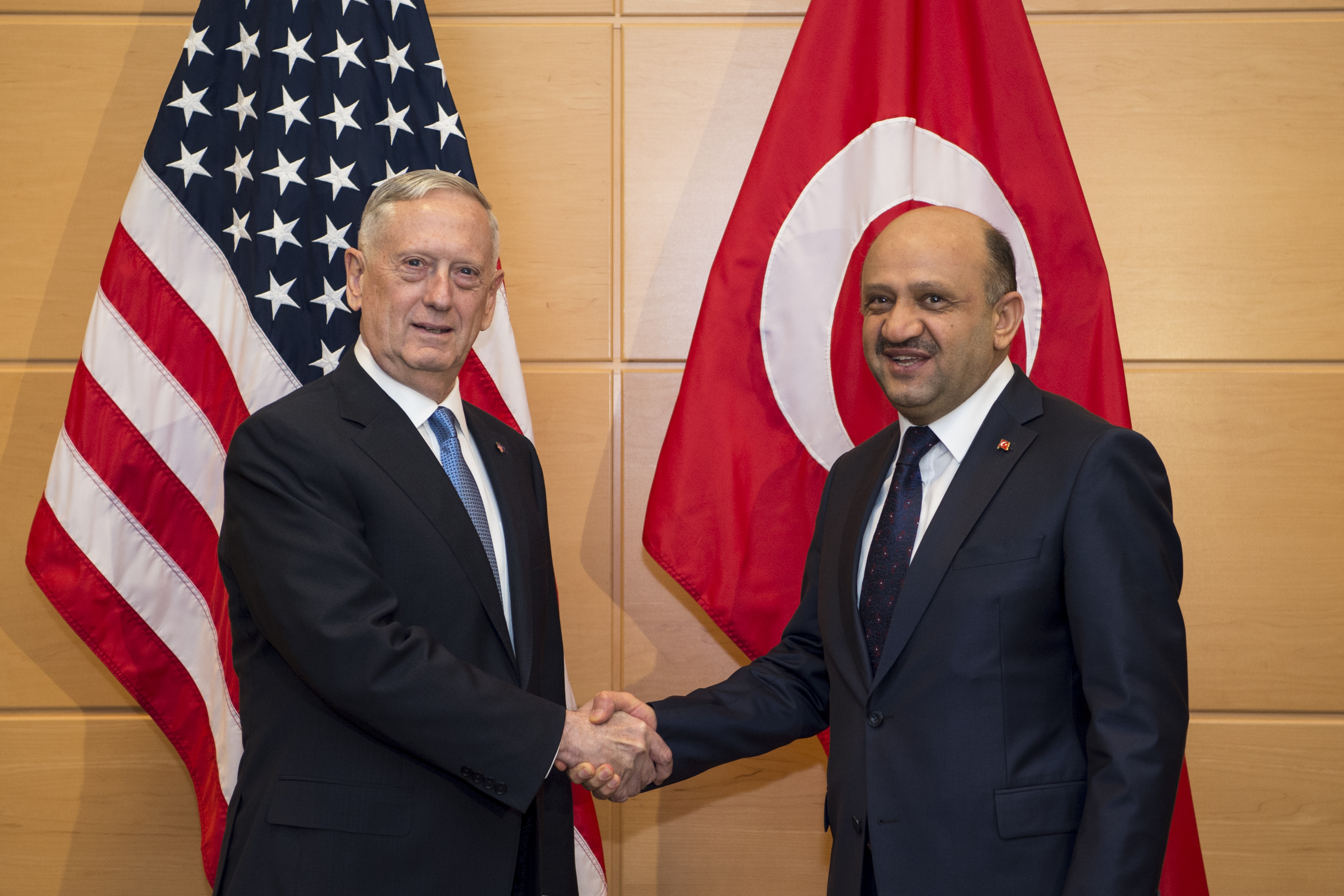
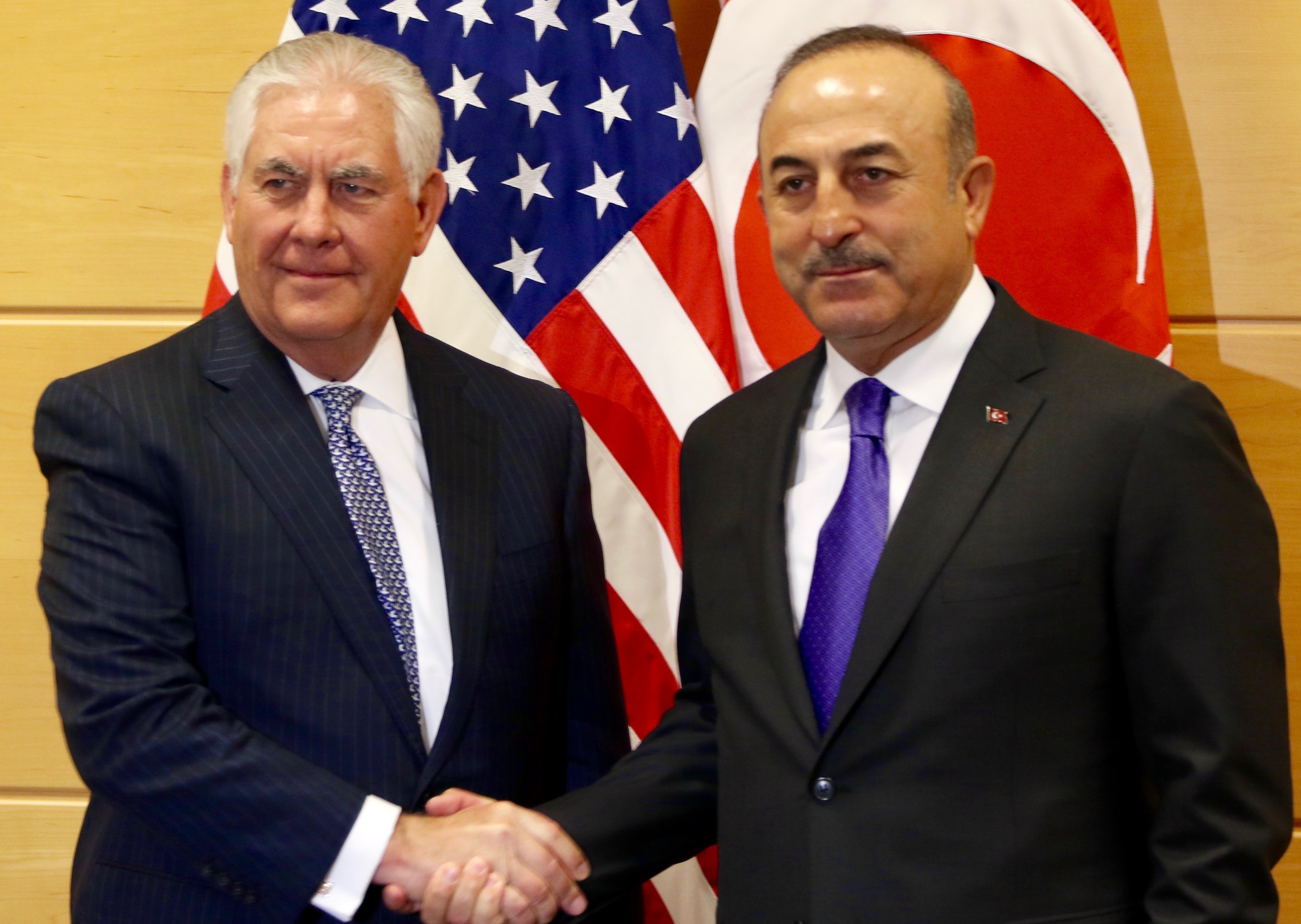
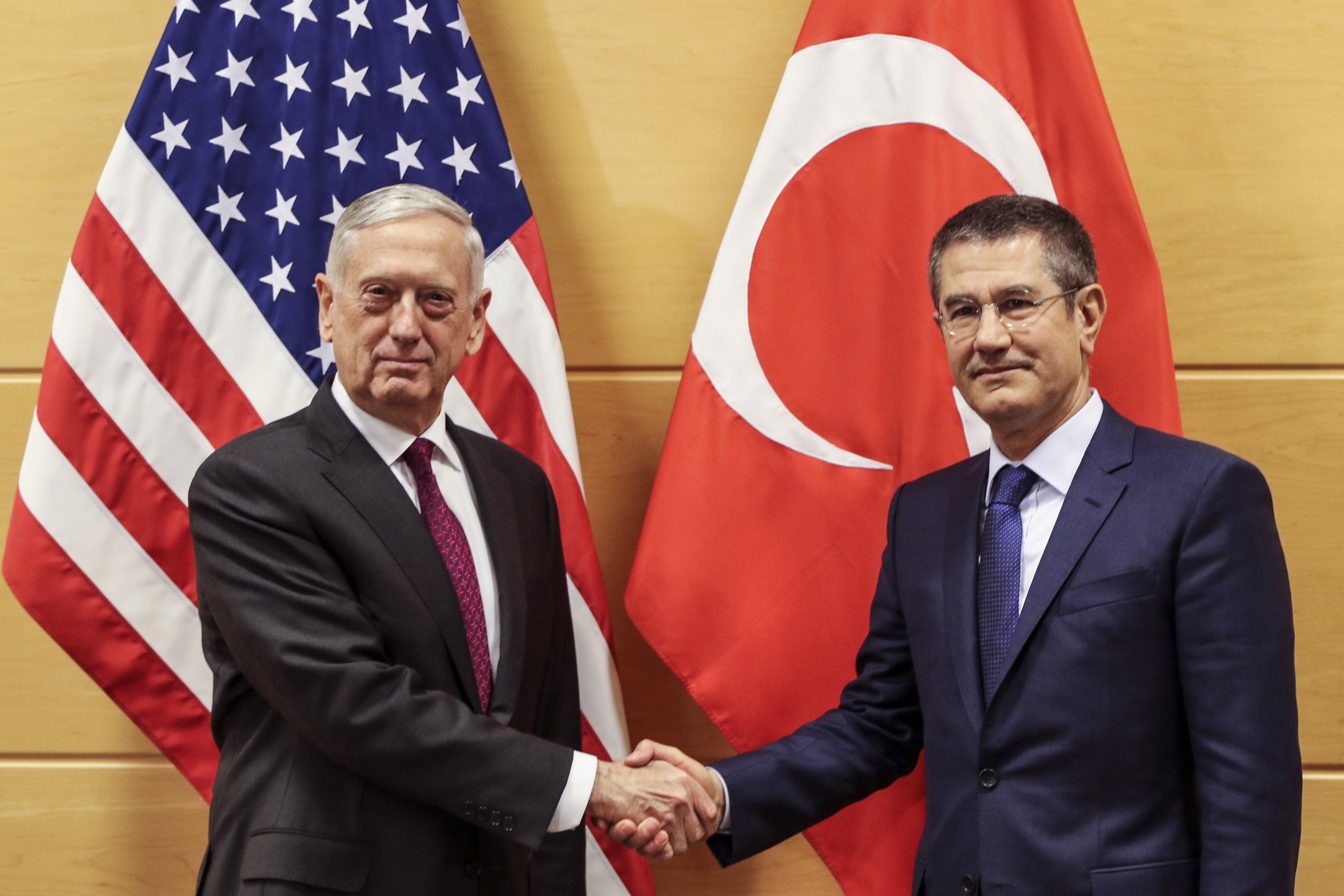
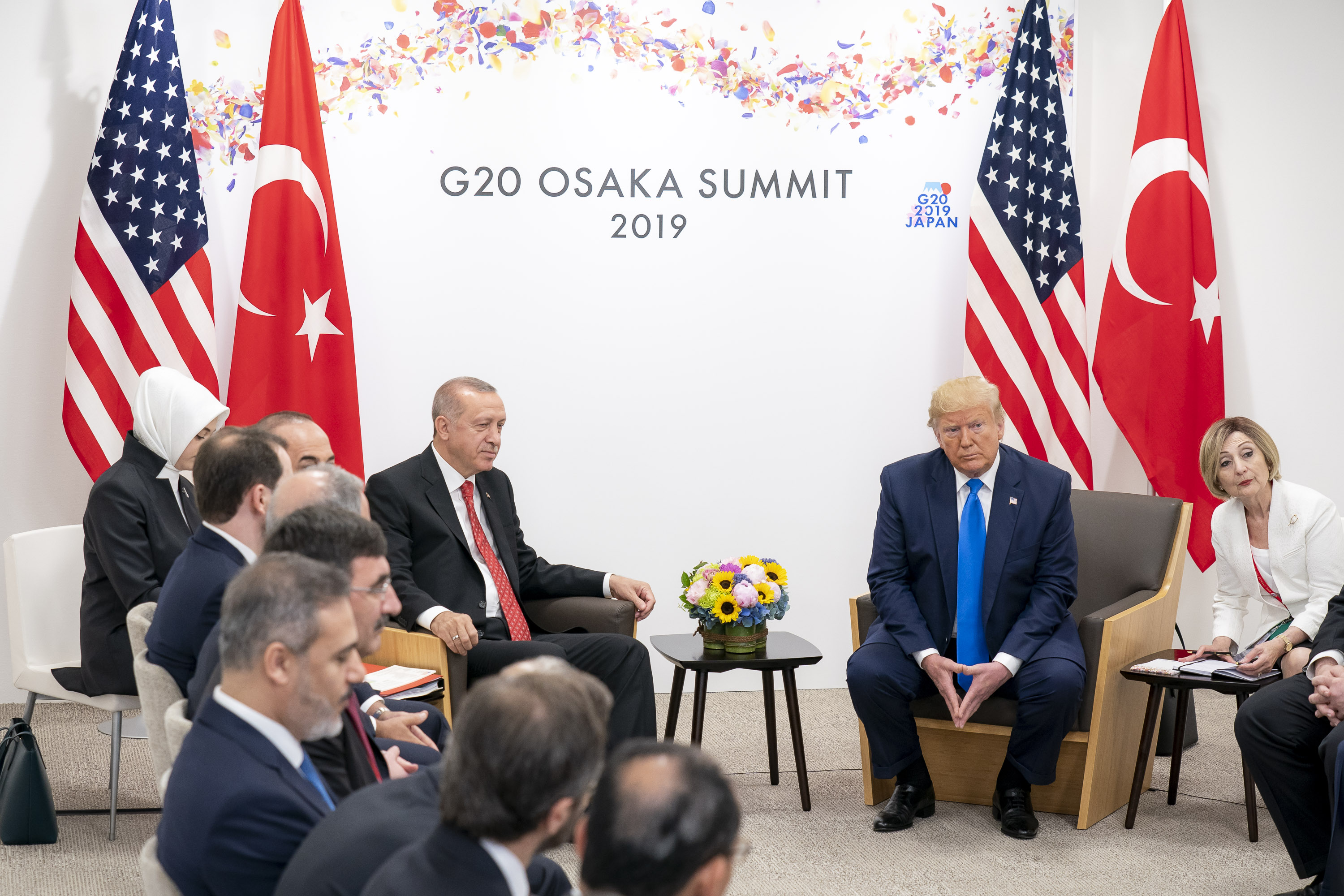
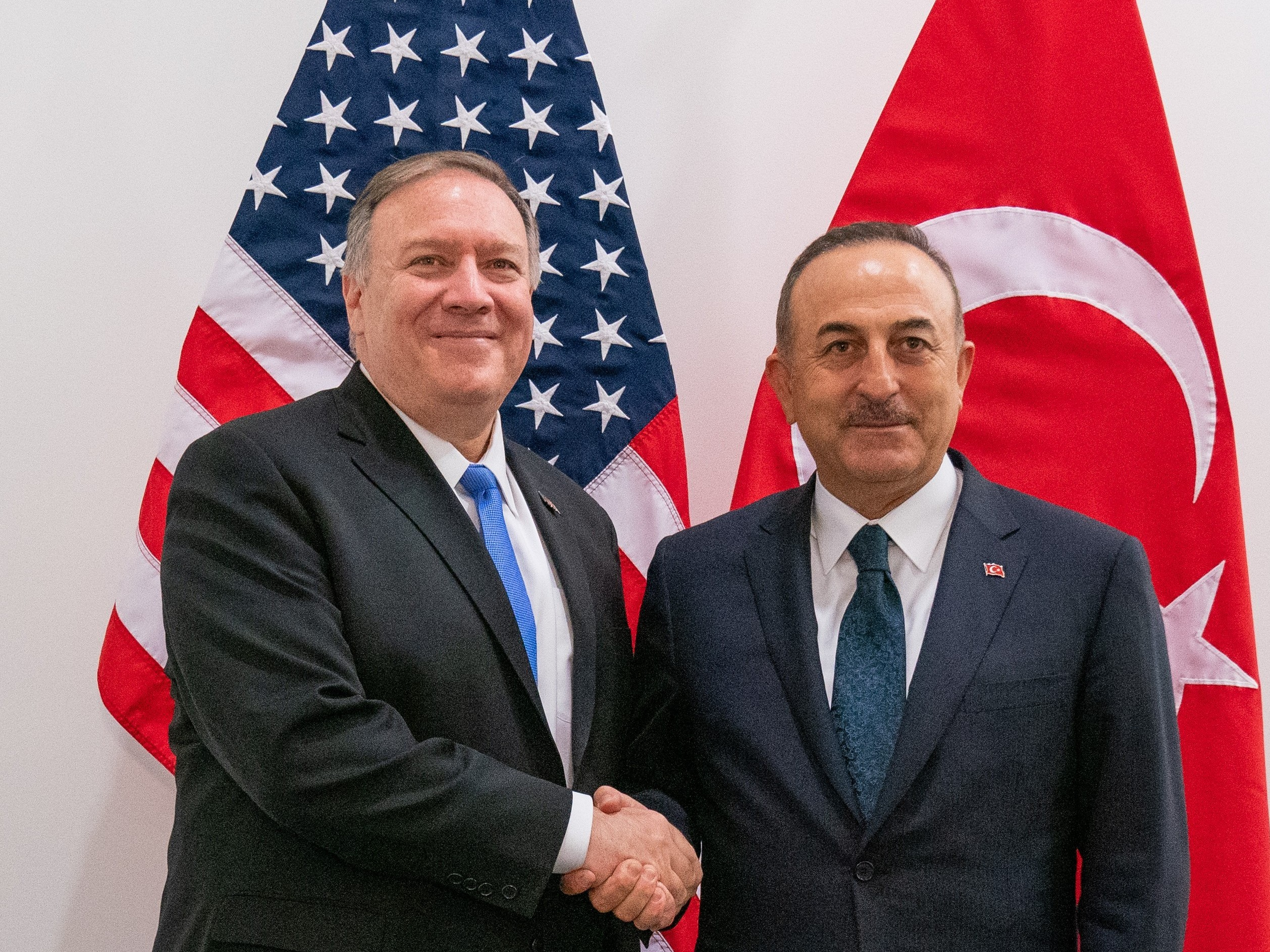
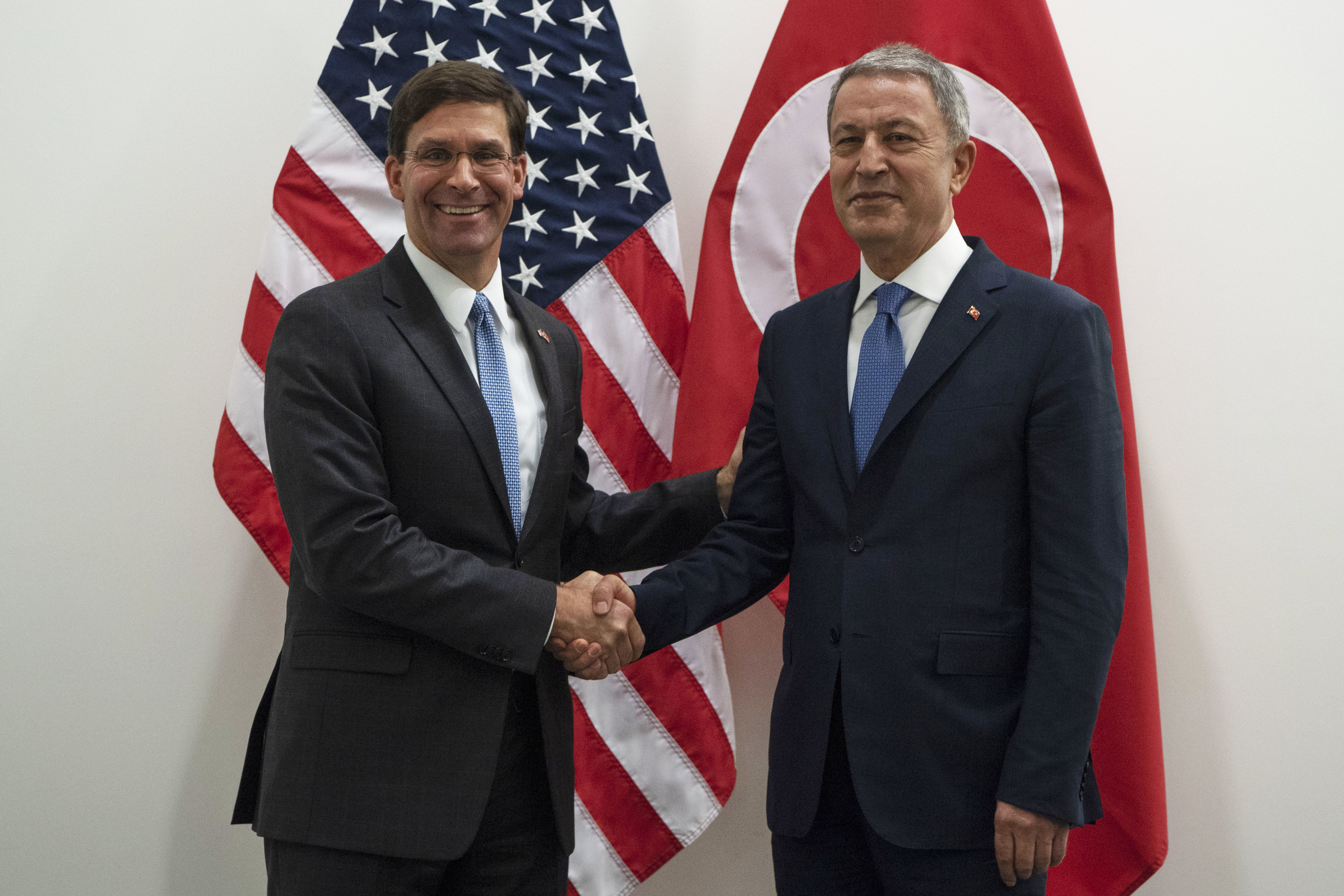
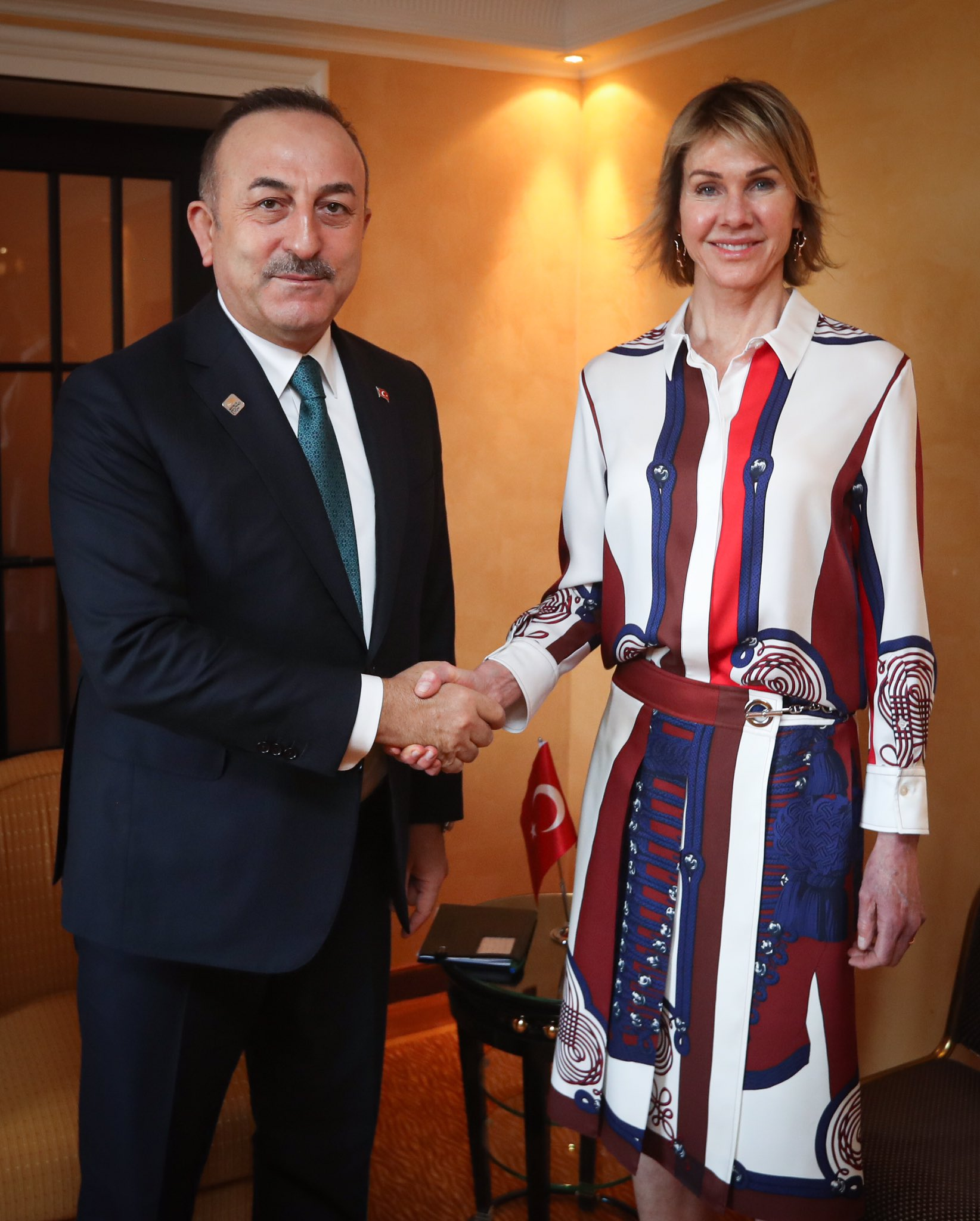

Because many people perceived former US Secretary of State and Democratic Party presidential nominee Hillary Clinton as friendly toward the Gülen movement, many Erdoğan supporters reportedly favored Republican Party presidential nominee Donald Trump in the United States' 2016 presidential election.

The Turkish government had a generally warm relationship with the Trump administration, backing the Trump administration's stance against Antifa groups during the George Floyd protests, and condemning restrictions placed on Trump's social media accounts as "digital fascism".

==== Saudi Arabia (Khashoggi) ====
The assassination of Jamal Khashoggi, a Saudi dissident, journalist for The Washington Post, and former general manager and editor-in-chief of Al-Arab News Channel, occurred on October 2, 2018, at the Saudi consulate in Istanbul, Turkey, and was perpetrated by agents of the Saudi Arabian government. Government officials of Turkey believe Khashoggi was murdered with premeditation. Anonymous Saudi officials have admitted that agents affiliated with the Saudi government killed him.

CIA Director Gina Haspel traveled to Turkey to address the investigation. Haspel's visit came before a planned speech by Erdoğan. She listened to audio purportedly capturing a saw cutting through bone. On November 20, US President Donald Trump rejected the CIA's conclusion that Crown Prince Mohammed bin Salman had ordered the killing. He issued a statement saying "it could very well be that the Crown Prince had knowledge of this tragic event — maybe he did and maybe he didn't" and that "in any case, [their] relationship is with the Kingdom of Saudi Arabia".

==== Qatar (diplomatic crisis) ====
On June 5, 2017, Turkey (Qatar–Turkey relations) supported Qatar in its diplomatic confrontation with a Saudi and Emirati-led bloc of countries that severed ties with and imposed sanctions on Qatar. US (Qatar–United States relations) was on the Saudi side, which argued on the basis of Qatar and state-sponsored terrorism. Turkey criticized the list of demands released by the Saudi and Emirati-led bloc on June 22, stating that they undermine Qatar's sovereignty. In December 2017, in defense of the US position, US national security advisor General H.R. McMaster said that Turkey had joined Qatar as a prime source of funding that contributes to the spread of extremist ideology of Islamism: "We're seeing great involvement by Turkey from everywhere from western Africa to Southeast Asia, funding groups that help create the conditions that allow terrorism to flourish."

A lot of Islamist groups have learned from Erdogan and his Justice and Development Party. It is a "model of really operating through civil society, then the education sector, then the police and judiciary, and then the military to consolidate power in the hands of a particular party (institution that is state-like in its organization, parallel state), which is something we'd prefer not to see and is sadly contributing to the drift of Turkey away from the West."

— National Security Adviser, General H.R. McMaster, US Official Accuses Turkey of Pushing Extreme Islamist Ideology, Voice of America

We expect the United States, which we continue to recognize as our friend and ally, to display the same stance to our country, to cease all forms of cooperation with terrorist groups such as YPG and provide more concrete and effective support in our ongoing determined fight against terrorism and radicalism.

— Ministry of Foreign Affairs, secretary to the Turkish Foreign Minister., US Official Accuses Turkey of Pushing Extreme Islamist Ideology, Voice of America

On June 26, 2024, H.R. McMaster and Ahmet Üzümcü (Turkish diplomat, former permanent representative to NATO) rehash the same issues at "Turkey: A Strained & Critical Alliance" discussion for the Turkey's work in advancing peace and prosperity relation to fight against ISIS.

==== Syria (Clashes at the Turkish Ambassador's Residence, Refugees, Pull-out, Barisha raid) ====
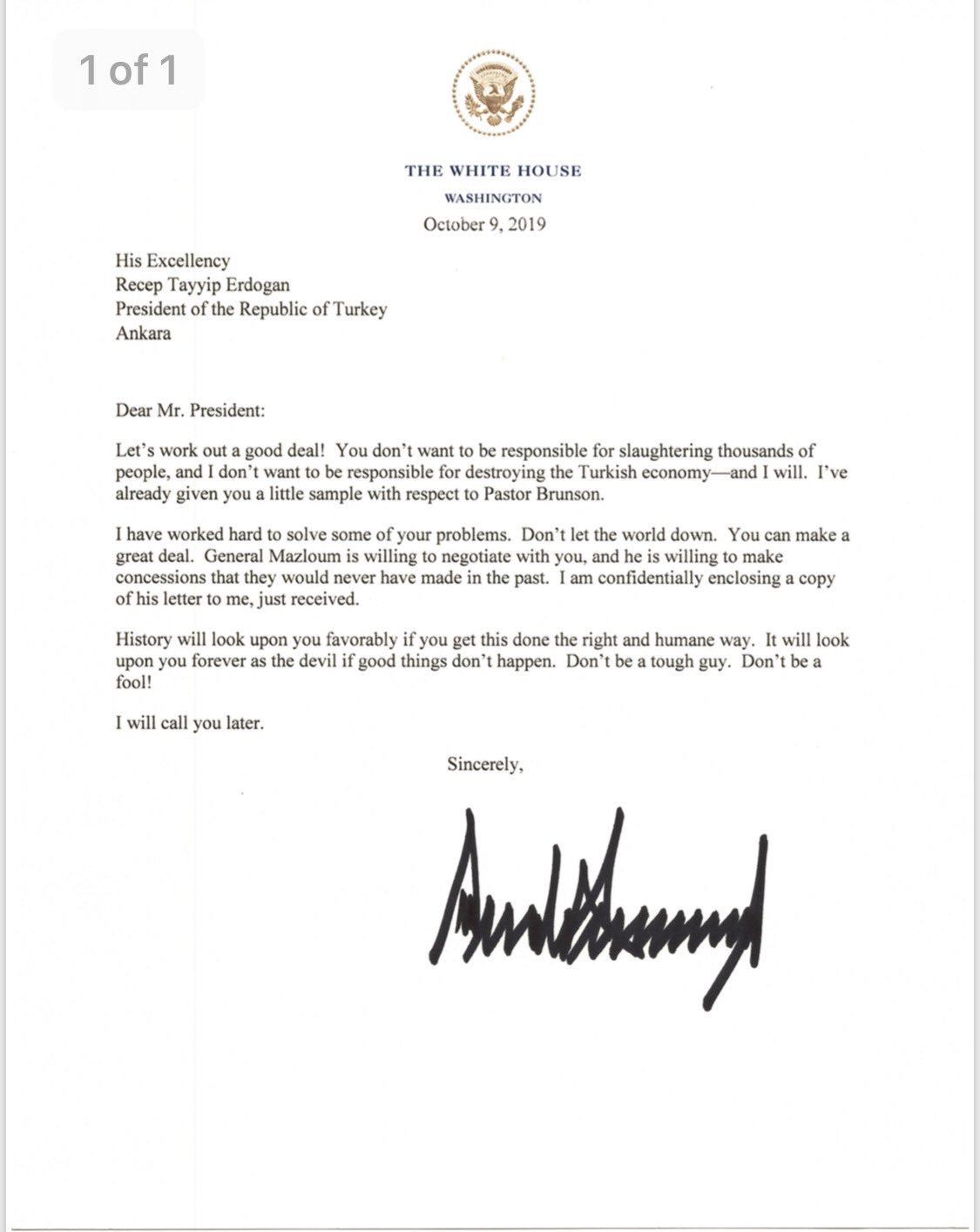
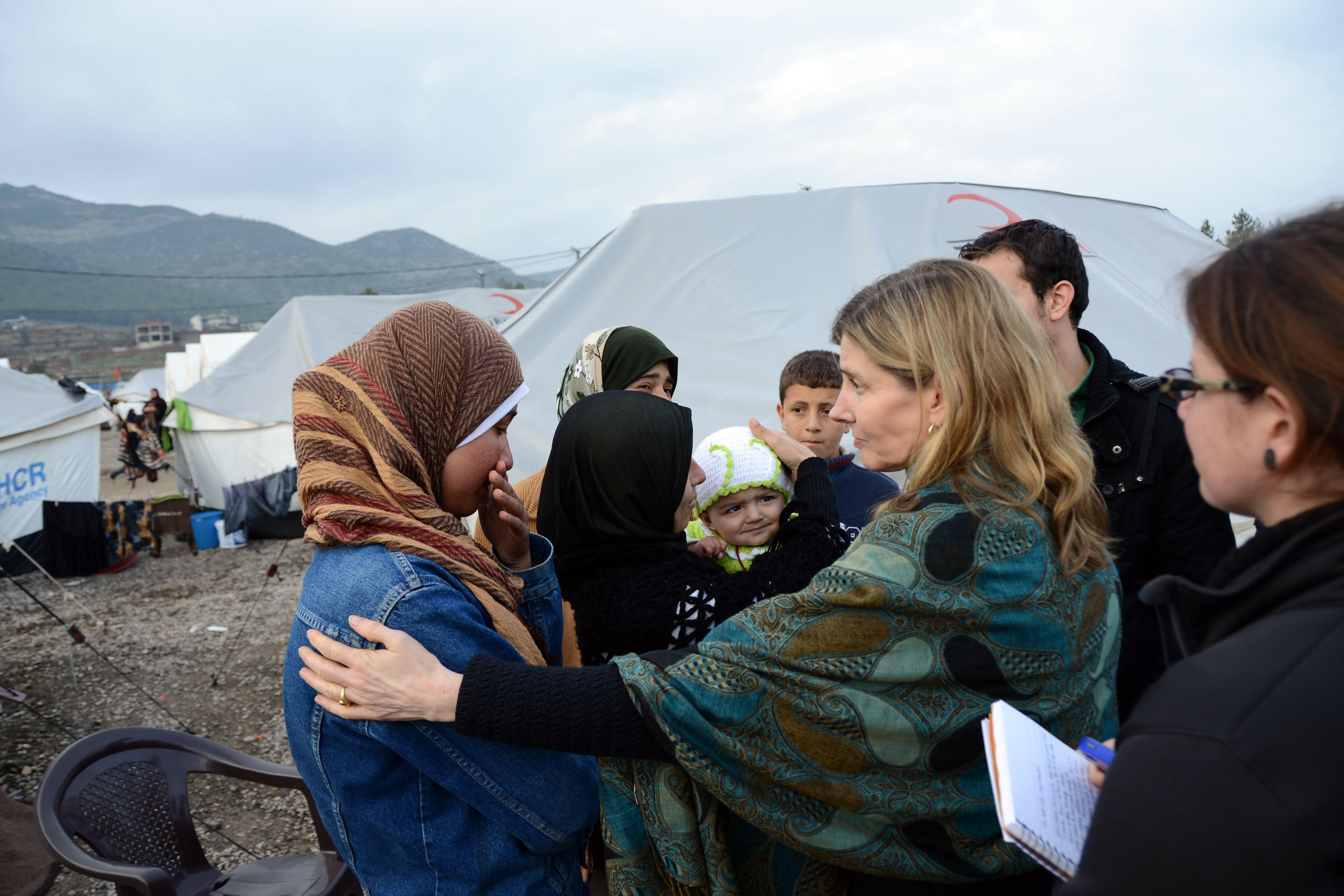
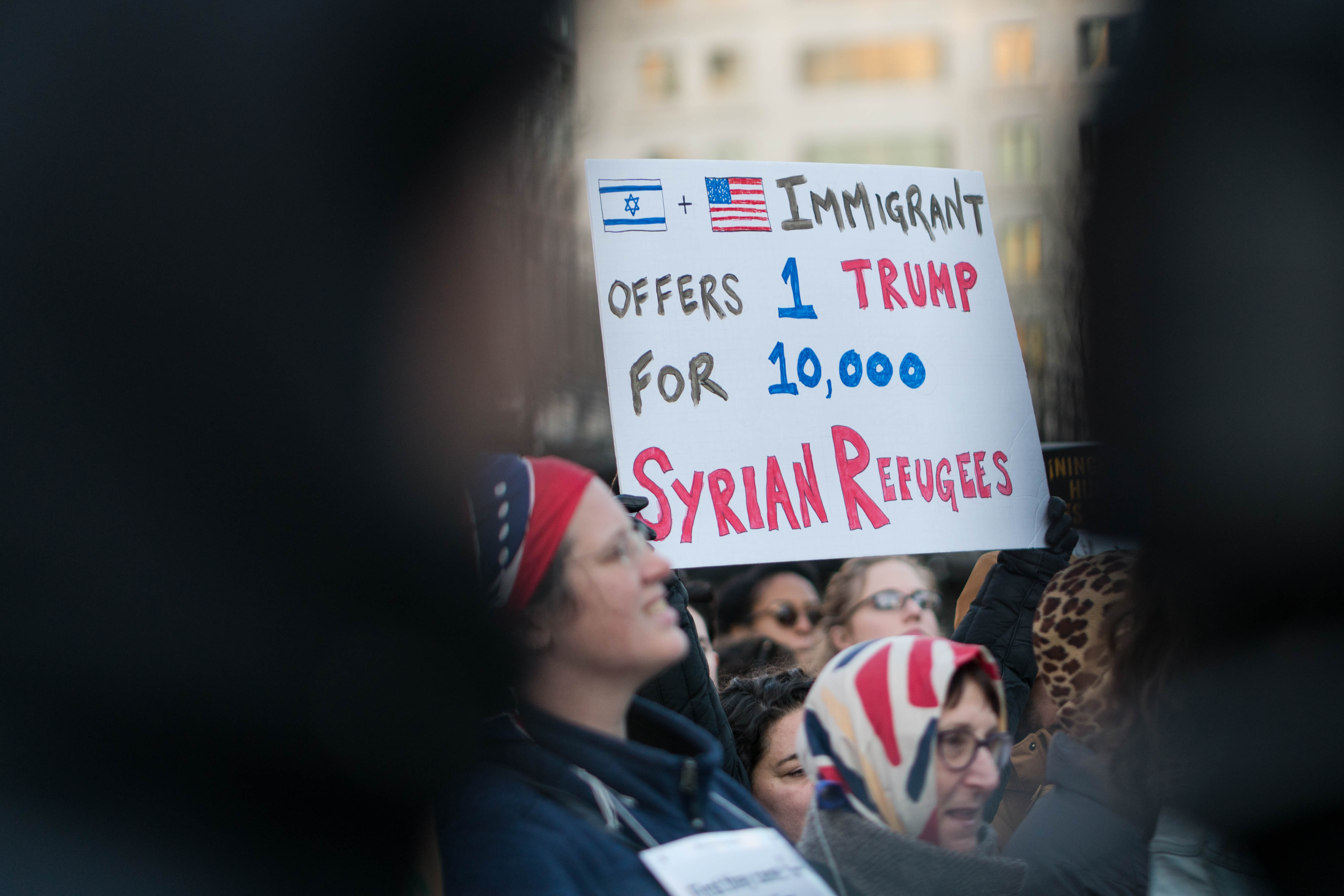
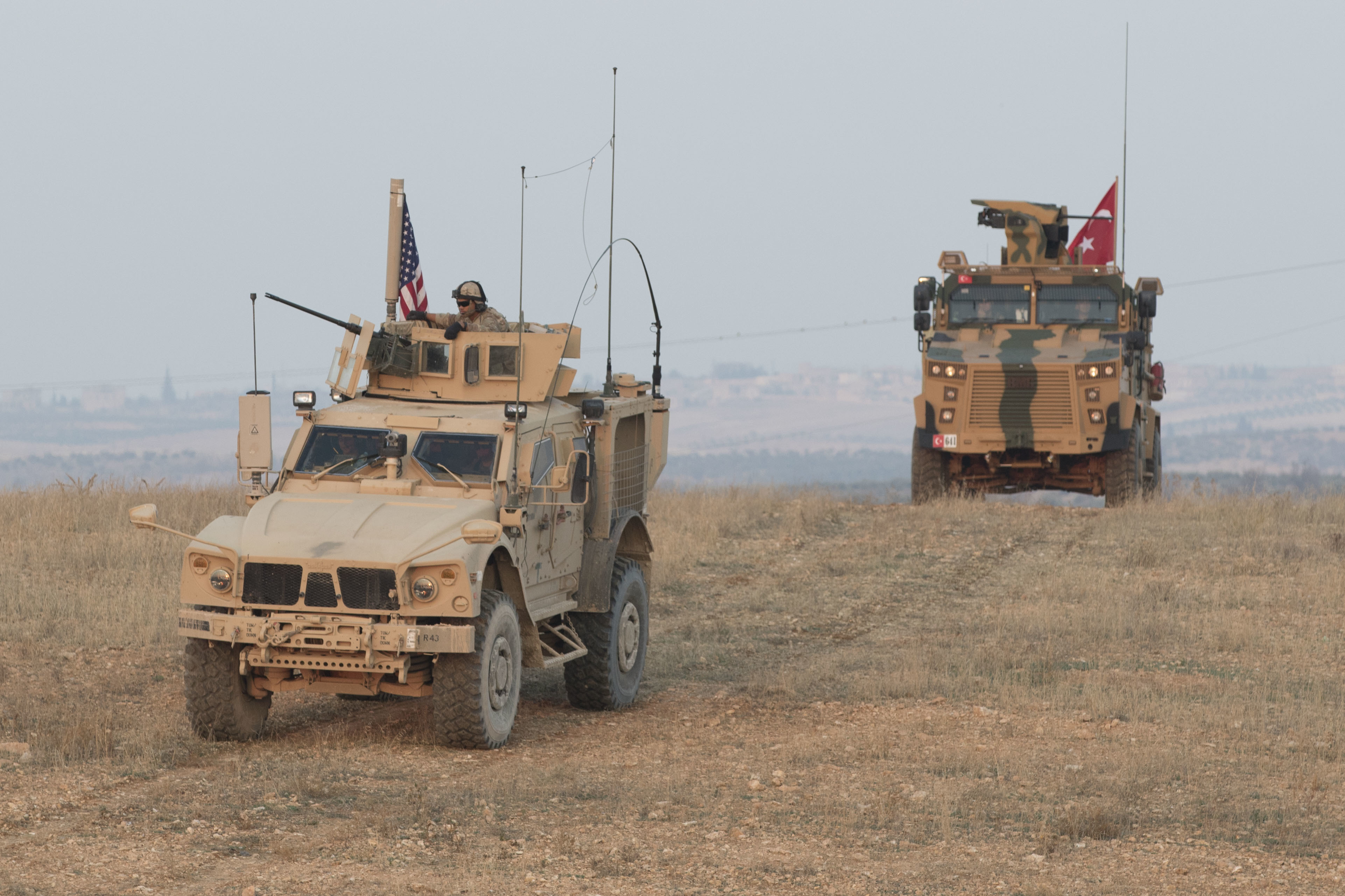
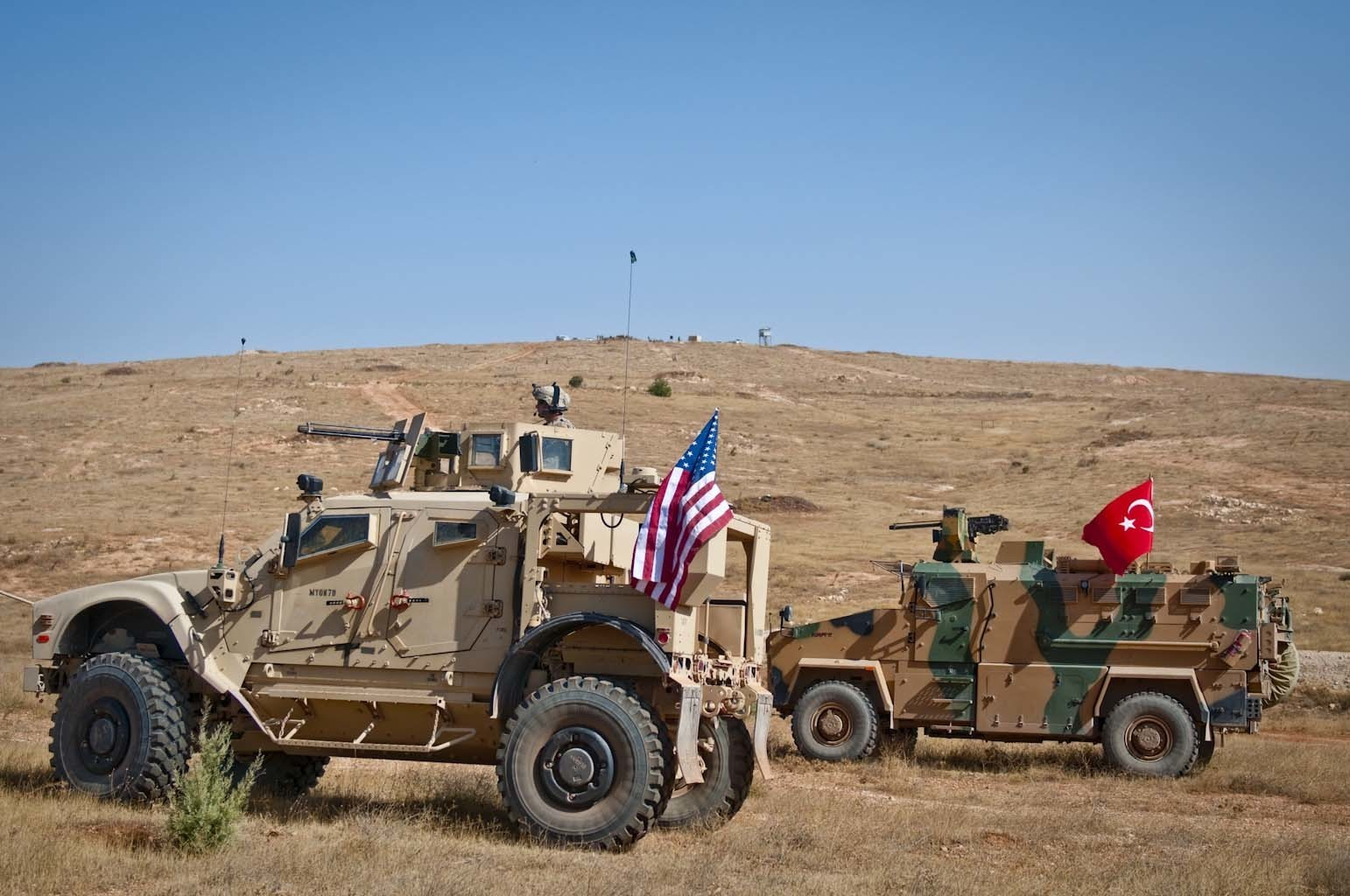

On May 16, 2017, McCain and McCaskill called for the expulsion (unwanted person) of the Turkish ambassador Serdar Kılıç for the embassy brawl. The clashes at the Turkish Ambassador's Residence in Washington, D.C. broke out on May 16, 2017, between Turkey's Police Counter Attack Team and a crowd of protesters, some of whom carried flags of the Democratic Union Party (Syria), a left-wing Syrian branch of the PKK.

The Turkey migrant crisis developed in the first half of the 2010s. According to UNHCR, Turkey hosted 63.4% of all refugees worldwide in 2018. As of 2019, 3.6 million refugees of the Syrian Civil War in Turkey numbered the highest among "registered" refugees. Turkey approached the problem in two ways. First, it focused on managing their presence in Turkish society by addressing their legal status, basic needs, employment, education, and impact on local communities. Second, Turkey encouraged the U.S. to establish safe zones in Syria. The Obama administration's rejection of refugee camps was about the potential for pulling the U.S. into a war with Russia. During and after his election campaign, Trump proposed establishing safe zones in Syria as an alternative to Syrian refugees' immigration to the US. In the past, "safe zones" have been interpreted, among other things, as no-fly zones over Syria. In the first few weeks of Trump's presidency, Turkey renewed its call for safe zones and proposed a new plan. The Trump administration spoke with several other Sunni Arab States regarding safe zones, and Russia has asked for clarification regarding any Trump administration plan regarding safe zones. The Trump travel ban actions include two executive orders: the first restricted citizens of seven countries, and the second restricted citizens of six Muslim-majority countries. The earlier draft, which was leaked, would have required the US to create a plan for safe zones in Syria, but under pressure safe zones were not in the final version of E.O. 13769. Military leadership, including SecDef Mattis, expressed strong reservations about the vast manpower requirements, open-ended financial commitment, and operational risks. A safe zone on the nordern boarder faced opposition from the YPG, given YPG's desire for their own administrative zone. Civil society groups argued against the Trump administration's "safe zone" as a ploy for an ban on Syrian refugees.

In November 2018, Trump said he would not approve any extension of the American deployment in Syria. In December 2018, Trump announced "We have won against ISIS", and ordered the withdrawal of all troops from Syria. ISIS sent a message to Trump with the 2019 Manbij bombing. The attack killed the wife of future Trump's NCTC director Joe Kent. On October 23, 2019, President Trump ordered the withdrawal of U.S. troops from the Syrian-Turkish border to southeastern Syria to enable Turkey to set up a new "Safe Zone". This was Turkey's own zone of control – a de facto safe zone – between the YPG enclaves, which was aimed primarily at preventing the YPG from forming a "corridor" at its border with Syria, but was an undeniable refuge for fleeing civilians. Obama presidency did not, but Trump did. The next day, SecDef Mattis resigned in protest, calling Trump's decision an abandonment of the U.S.'s YPG allies. Rep. Schneider, as a foreign policy position, declared in his speech to The House "...immediately compromises our national security, dramatically undermines American credibility, and will have negative strategic implications for generations to come," and an end-of-day bill (S. 2644) to impose sanctions with respect to Turkey, and for other purposes passed. The House condemned Trump's decision. H.R.4692 and S.2644 cut Turkey off from procurement. In the final version of Trump's solution, significantly different than Clinton's no-fly zones for the YPG, Trump put Turkish pilots against Russian ones, creating less risk against Assad's troops and the groups fighting them.

Trump: "I order the withdrawal of all troops from Syria"

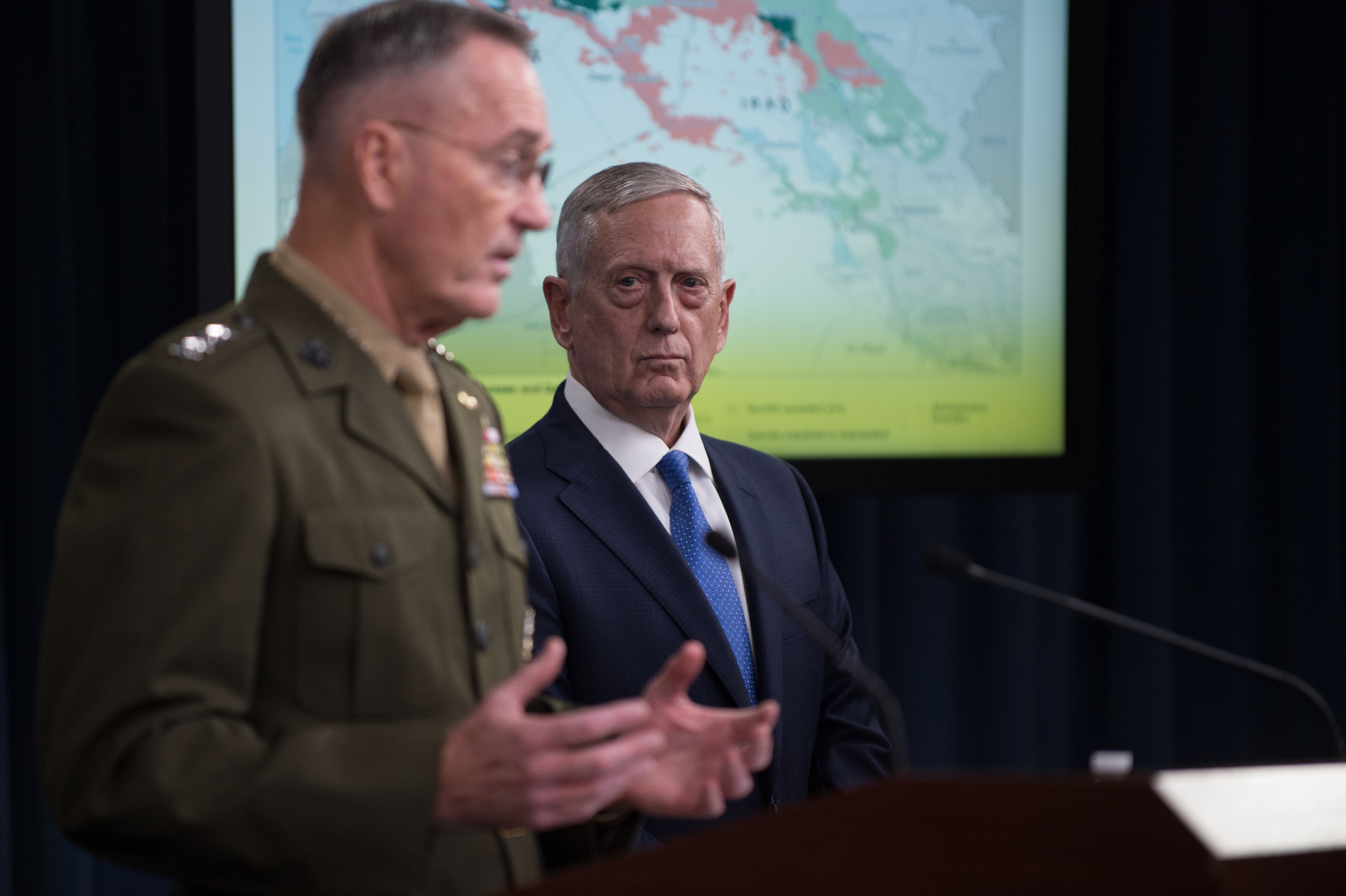
James Mattis Resigned

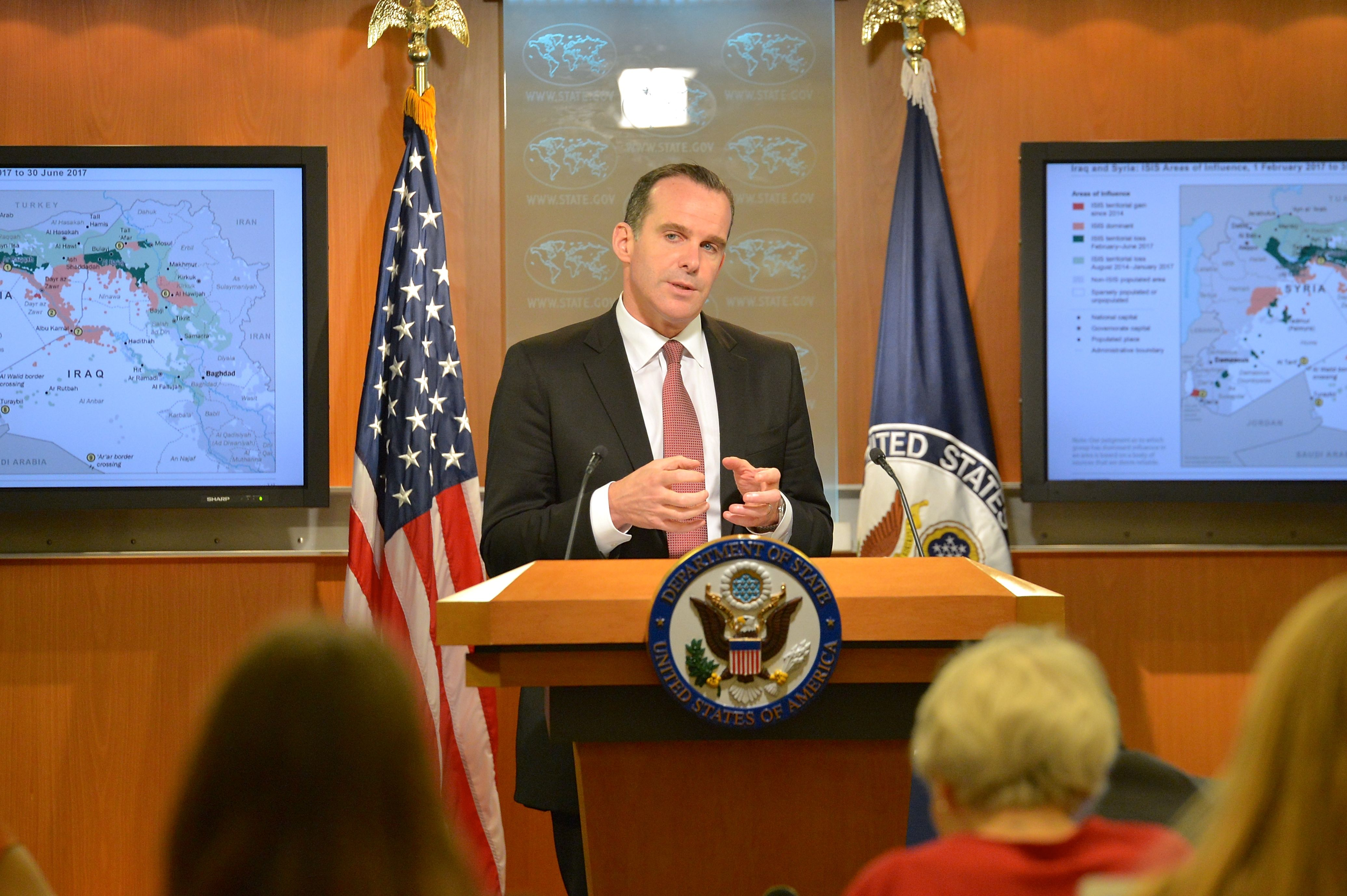
Brett McGurk Resigned

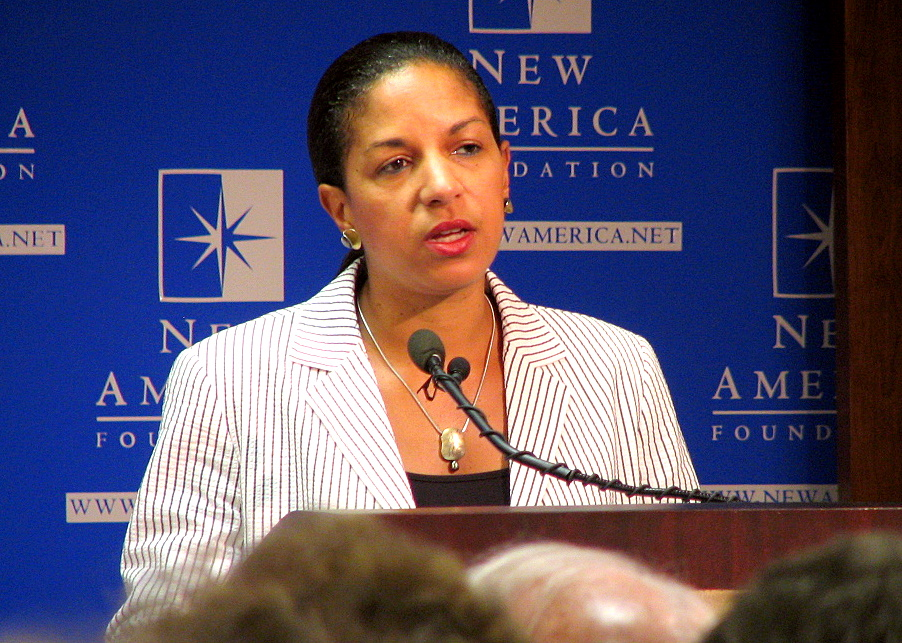
Susan Rice: White House is leaving its Kurdish allies "to the wolves"

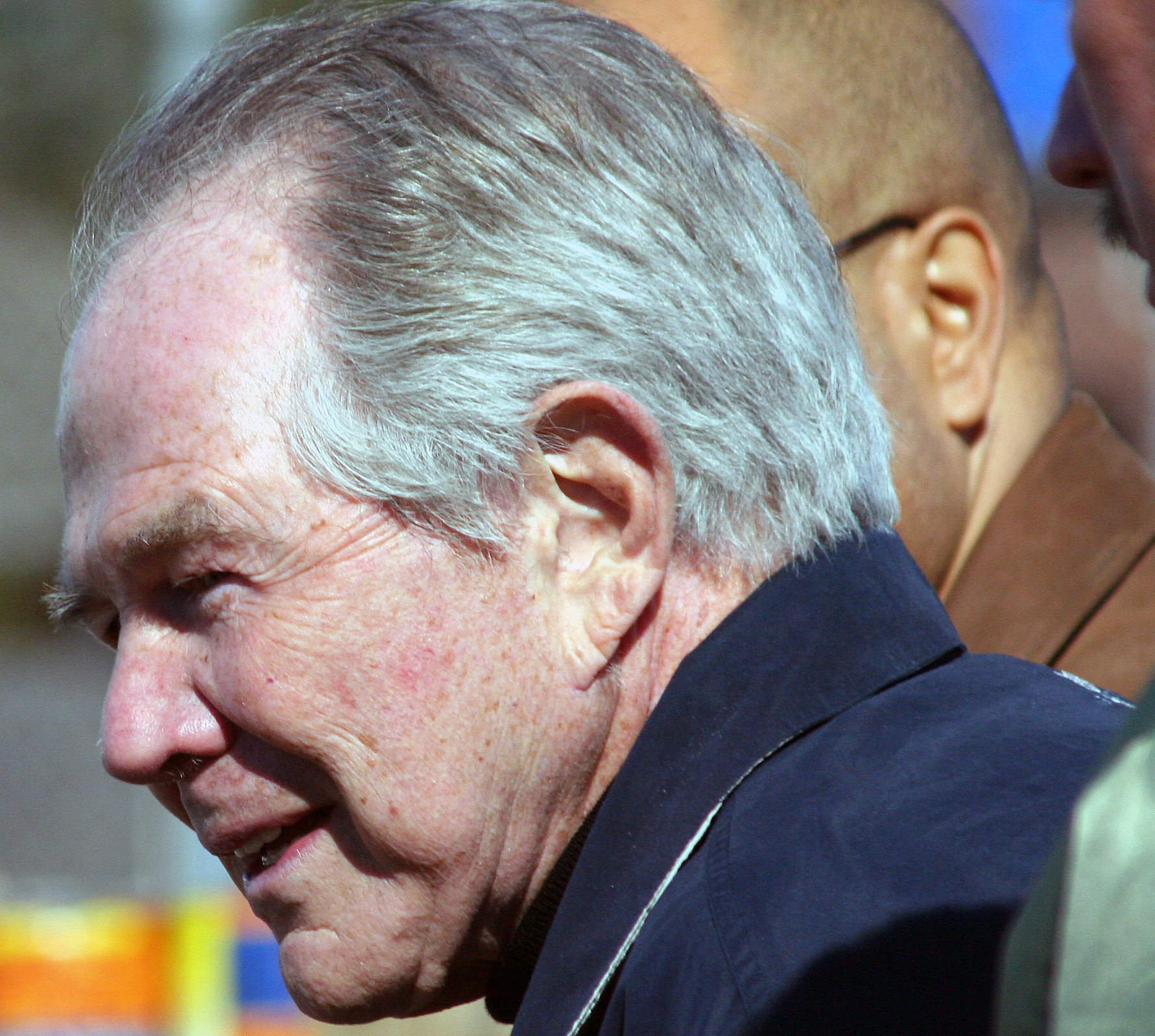
Pat Robertson: Trump is "in danger of losing the mandate of heaven" over Syria decision

According to two anonymous American officials, the Central Intelligence Agency obtained original intelligence on Baghdadi following the arrests of one of his wives and a courier. The arrest of al-Baghdadi's top aide Ismael al-Ethawi was the key: al-Ethawi was found and followed by informants in Syria, apprehended by Turkish authorities, and handed over to the Iraqi intelligence, to whom he provided information in February 2018. In 2019, US, Turkish, and Iraqi intelligence conducted a joint operation in which they captured several senior ISIL leaders who provided the locations where they met with Baghdadi inside Syria. According to Voice of America, the fate of al-Baghdadi "was sealed by the capture of his aide". Turkish and US military authorities exchanged and coordinated information ahead of the attack in Barisha, Harem District, Idlib Governorate, Syria. President Trump thanked Russia, Turkey, Syria, and Iraq for aiding US operation, and praised Erdoğan, claiming that he is "a big fan", a "friend of [his]" and "a hell of a leader."

US "committed" to staying in Syria

January 6, 2019, Israel visit: Bolton: "Turkey, agree to protect America's Kurdish allies"

October 23, 2019: Trump: 'breakthrough' on Syria, Sanctions on Turkey

==== Gülen Movement (extradition – Flynn – Brunson – Visa & Tariff) ====
In July 2016, after the failed coup attempt, Turkey demanded that the United States government extradite Fethullah Gülen, a cleric and Turkish national living in the U.S. state of Pennsylvania. However, the US government demanded that Turkey produce evidence of Gülen's connection with the coup attempt. On July 19, an official request was sent to the US for the extradition of Fethullah Gülen. Senior U.S. officials said this evidence pertained to certain pre-coup alleged subversive activities.

On November 8, 2016, The Hill published an op-ed by Flynn stating that US ally Turkey was in crisis and needed US support on the day of the 2016 United States presidential election. Flynn called for the US to back Erdoğan's government and alleged that the regime's opponent Fethullah Gülen, who is a Pennsylvania-based opposition cleric and the leader of the gulen movement whose members were purged in Turkey because of the 2016 Turkish coup d'état attempt, headed a "vast global network" that fit "the description of a dangerous sleeper terror network". Flynn, who was specialized in US counterterrorism strategy and dismantling insurgent networks, argued Gulen falls into radical Islamist groups aligned with Seyed Qutb and Hasan al Bana and he finished his article stating "running a scam". On March 8, 2017, four months after the publication, General Flynn filed documents with the Federal government indicating consulting work that might have aided the government of Turkey. The Crossfire Hurricane (FBI investigation) ("Crossfire Razor" – a counterintelligence investigation on Flynn) was taken over by the Mueller special counsel investigation (May 17, 2017). Flynn was part of Mueller's special counsel investigation.

(alleged plot) Flynn delivering Gulen to Turkey

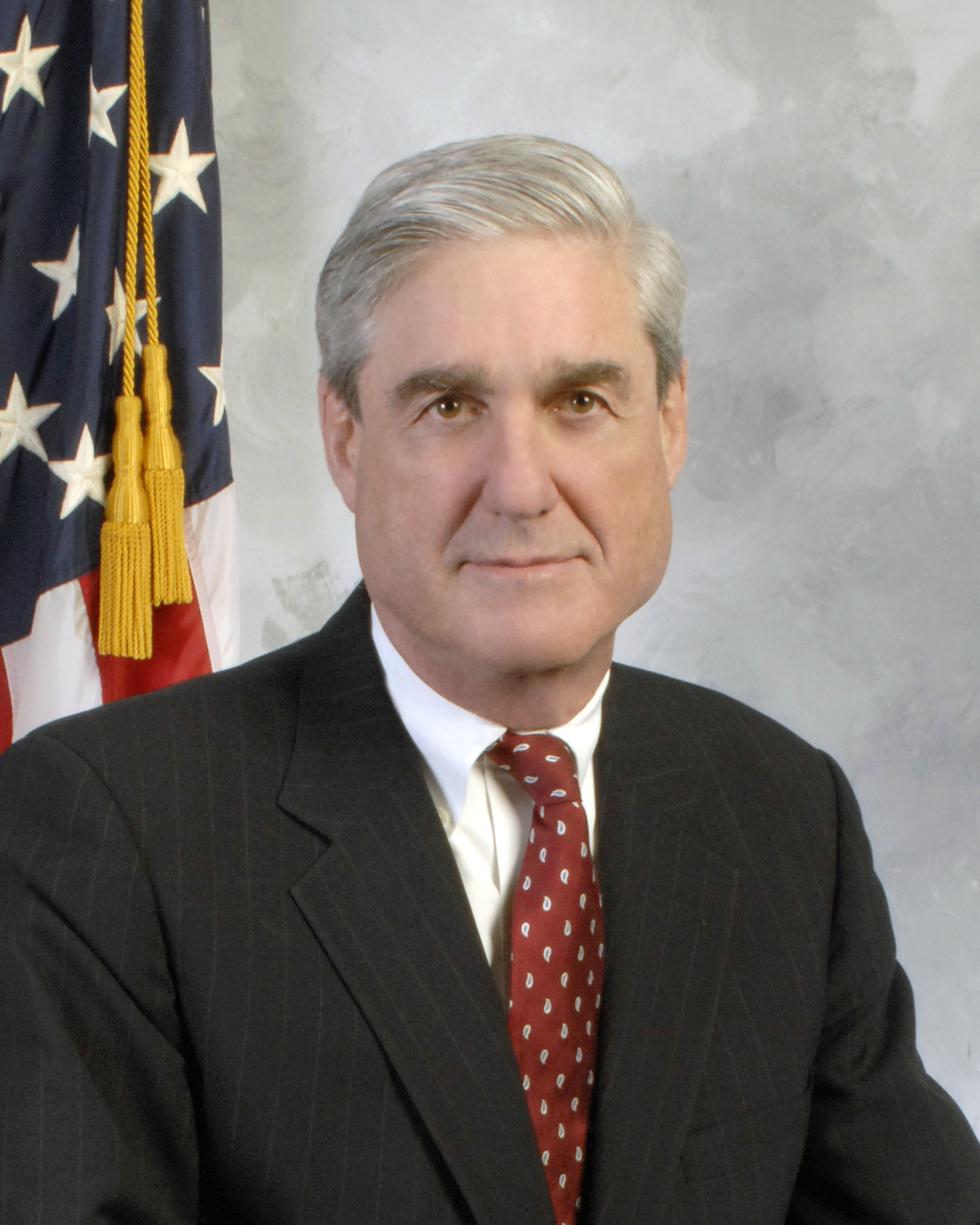
Robert Mueller. Reza Zarrab, a witness at Halkbank exchange gold for Iranian oil (Turkey oil trading controversy), offered evidence and became Mueller's key for Flynn in the investigation.

Mueller report's conclusion on the issue ("concerned a country other than Russia (i.e., Turkey)") on page 183.

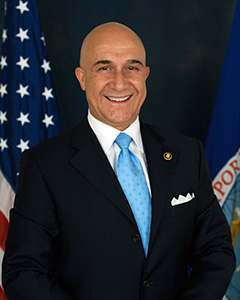
Bijan Kian. Trial testimony indicated foreign customer was interested in classified government information on Gülen, surveillance of supporters, and likely terrorist links that might be turned up by Turkey's investigations of the cleric.

"Turkey Project:" Flynn's materially false statements and omissions tried at United States v. Flynn.

In 2017, the special counsel, Robert Mueller, began probing whether Michael Flynn was part of an alleged plot to kidnap the cleric for Turkey. Michael Flynn's consulting company was hired by Inovo BV, a company owned by Kamil Ekim Alptekin. Alptekin also chairs the Turkish-American Business Council, an arm of the Foreign Economic Relations Board of Turkey (DEIK). Trump transition aide Bijan Kian played key role in Flynn's connection to the case. Federal investigators probing the lobbying work of national security adviser Michael Flynn are focused in part on the role of Bijan Kian. In 2017, FBI investigated whether Fethullah Gulen skimmed money from charter schools in the US. Gülen movement schools is a network of more than 150 U.S. charter schools (as of 2017). Gulen-linked educational institutions (schools in varying categories, and classifications) are sizable with 300 in Turkey and over 1,000 worldwide.

Evangelicals — Turkey

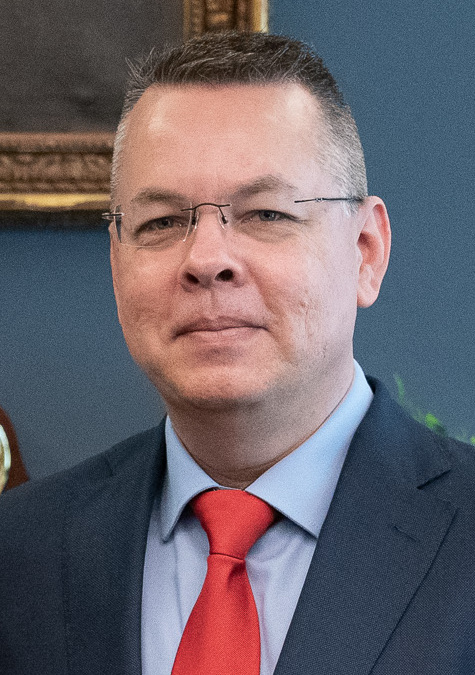
Brunson

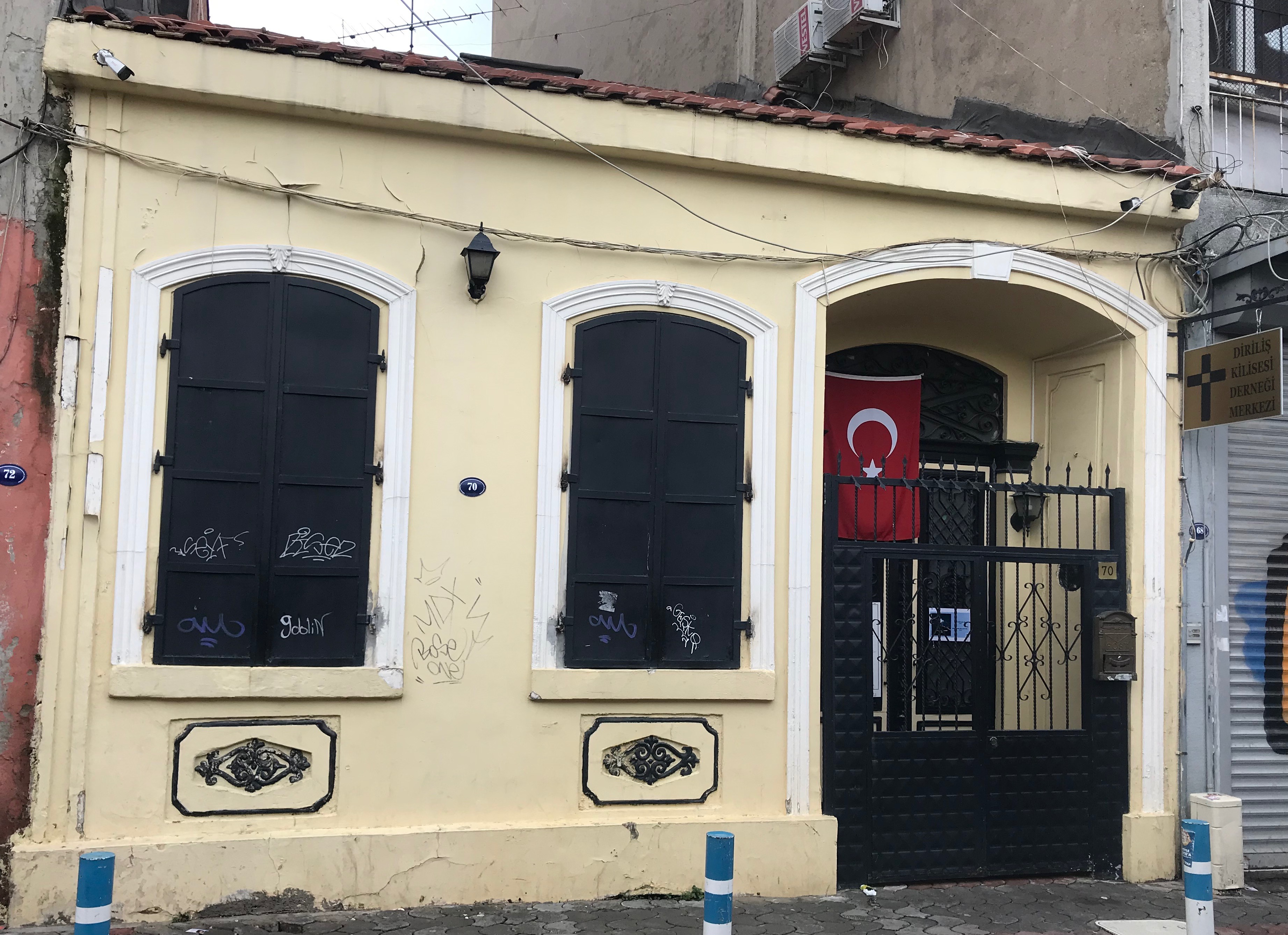
Izmir Resurrection Church

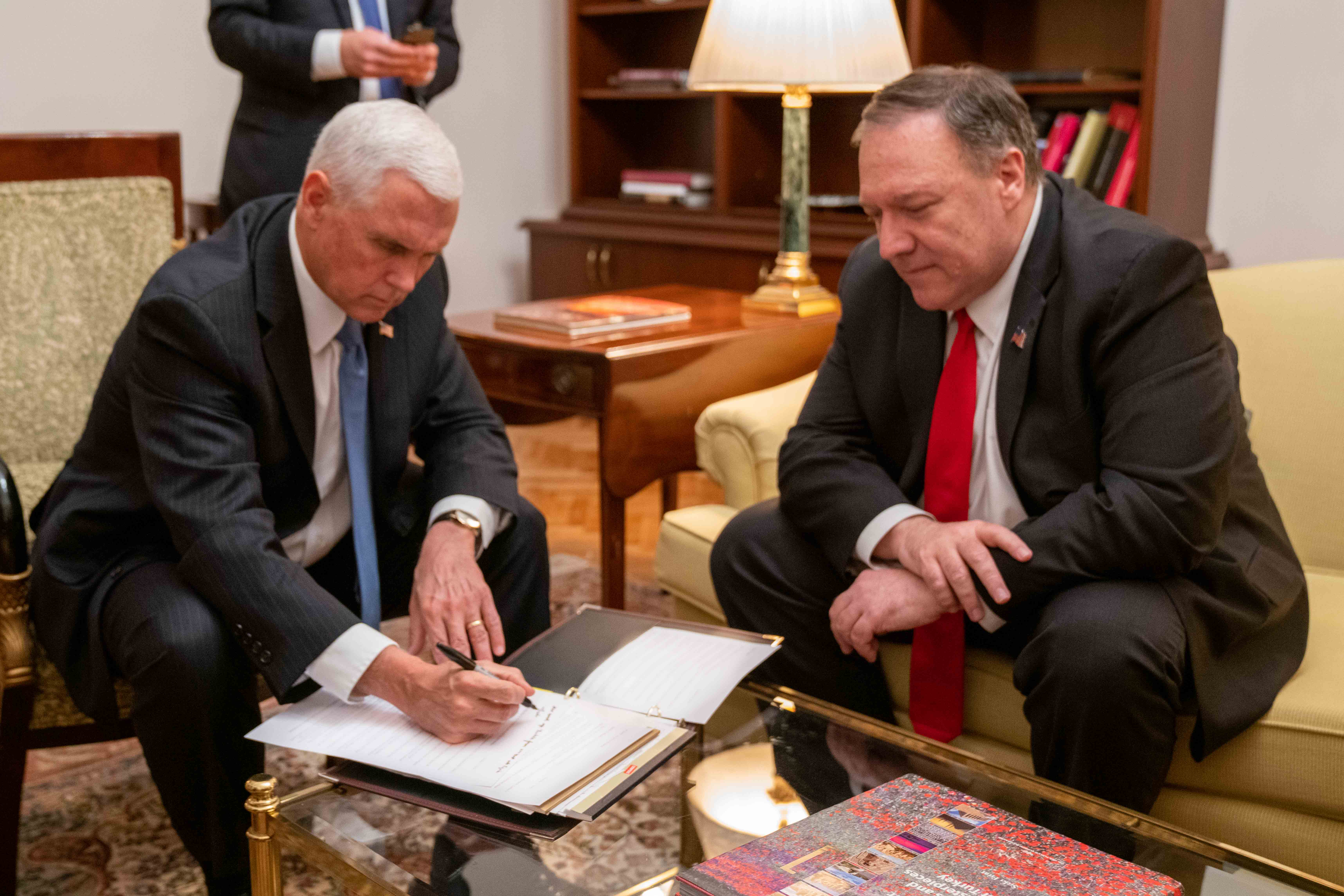
October 17, 2019: Pence and Pompeo prepare for a joint press conference in Ankara, Turkey.

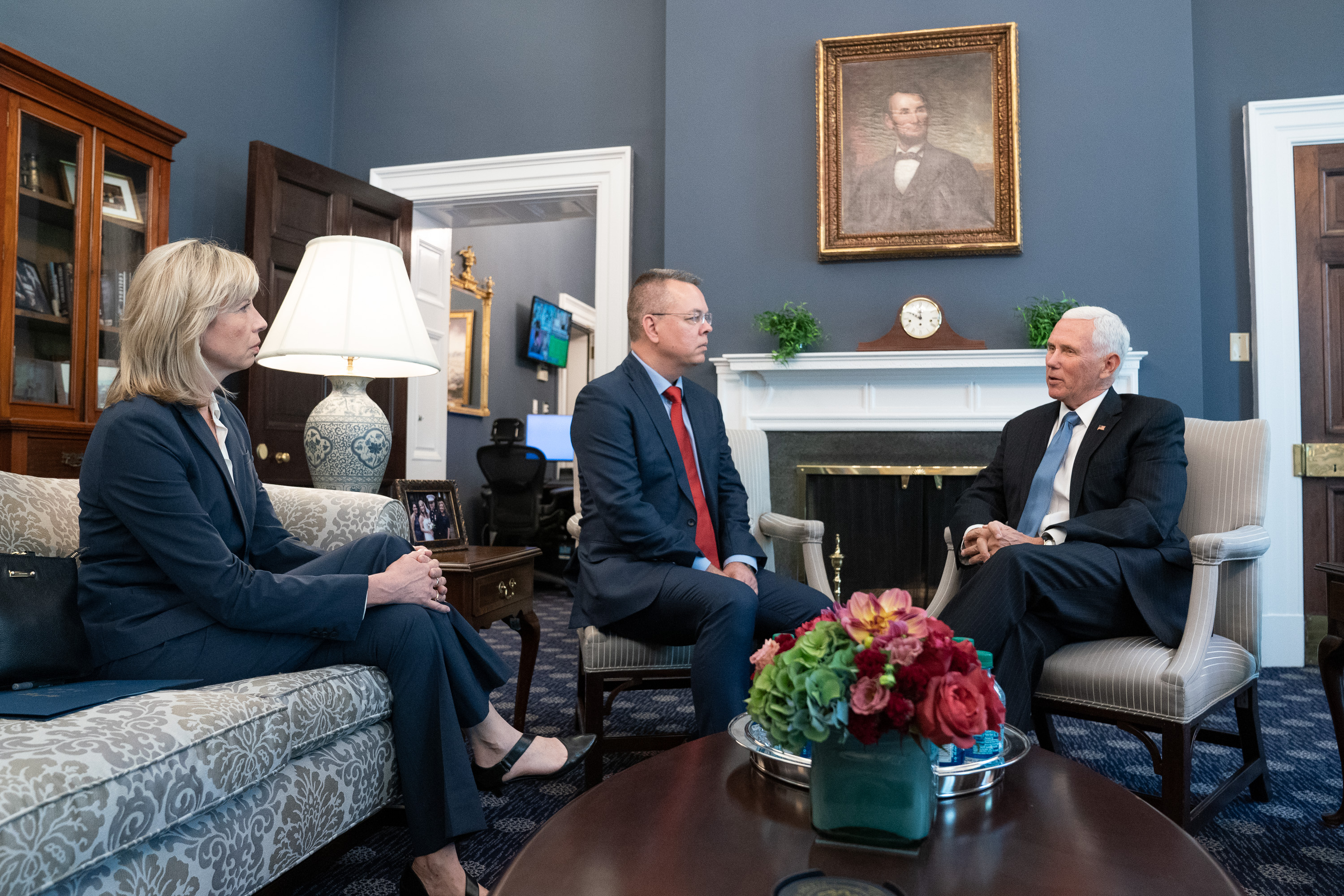
Pence meets with Brunson

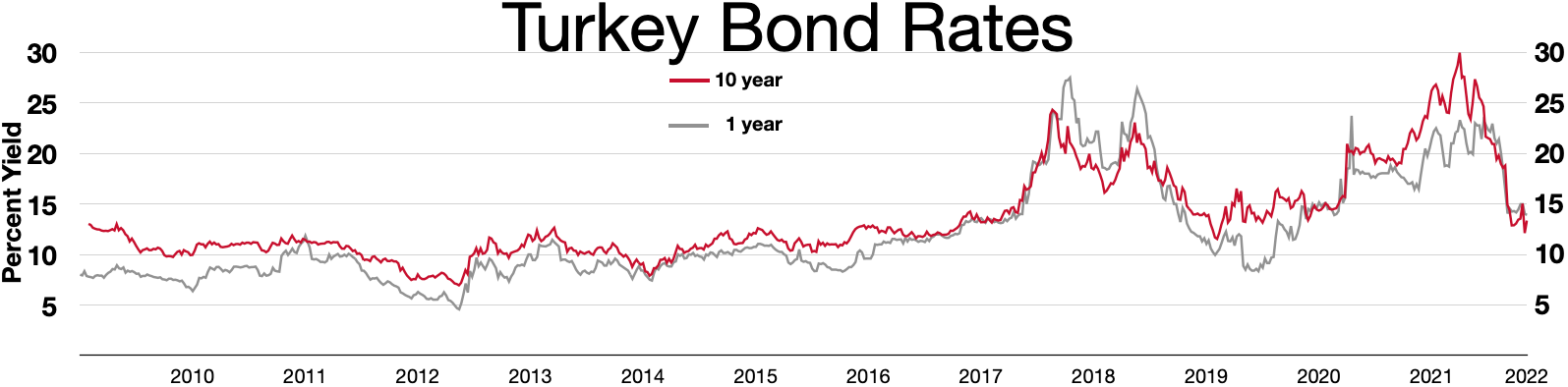
Turkey bond rates
Inverted yield curve in 2018 and 2022
10 year bond
1 year bond

Serkan Golge, a naturalized US citizen, was jailed in Turkey for three years on charges of participating in terrorism and conspiring against the government as a member of the Gülen movement. Metin Topuz, a US consulate employee, was charged with having links to Gülen and was arrested under "terror charges" by an Istanbul court. Topuz was the second US government employee in Turkey to be arrested in 2017. Pastor Andrew Brunson was charged with terrorism and espionage during the purges that followed the 2016 Turkish coup d'état attempt. The U.S-based Christian group Voice of the Persecuted took up the Brunsons’ cause, as had opposition Parliament members in Turkey and other Protestant pastors in the largely Muslim nation. Brunson's fate was determined at the Directorate General of Migration Management which gave the instruction for detention and deportation of Brunson." Selina Dogan, a member from the Republican People's Party, attempted to free Brunson. The Turkish government said the post-coup crackdown was not just on Gulen movement but also (subversive activities) links to Kurdish militants and terror coming from Islamic State.

The United States suspended all non-immigrant visas for Turkey "indefinitely" following Topuz's arrest. Turkey retaliated against the US with suspensions of all US visas, including tourist visas, shortly after the US State Department made their announcement. On August 1, 2018, the US Department of Treasury imposed sanctions on Justice minister Abdulhamit Gül and interior minister Suleyman Soylu, who were involved in the detention of Brunson. Daniel Glaser, the former Treasury official under Obama, said: "It's certainly the first time I can think of" the U.S. sanctioning a NATO ally. On August 10, 2018, Trump imposed punitive tariffs against Turkey after an impasse over Brunson's imprisonment and other issues. On August 10, 2018, Trump tweeted that he would double tariffs (first Trump tariffs) on Turkish steel and aluminum using the "Section 232" which was imposed on countries whose exports threaten to impair national security. Markets responded and the lira plunged. Depending on the calculation, nearly 40% year-to-date or 20% just after the tweet. Michael Klein said "It's not like the United States caused this, but there's probably some element of the trade spat [signaling to] investors and Turkish residents that things were not going to get better." With both internal structural weaknesses and US sanctions Turkey's economy fall into Turkish economic crisis (2018–current). Later in December 2022, the WTO ruled against the United States saying that there was no national security emergency that justified US invocation of the exception The move prompted Erdoğan to say that the United States was "[ex]changing a strategic NATO partner for a pastor" and that the US' behavior would force Turkey to look for new friends and allies.

The presidential spokesperson, İbrahim Kalın, tweeted that the US is losing Turkey, and that the entire Turkish public is against U.S. policies. In addition, the Uşak Province decided to stop running digital advertisement on United States-based social media platforms like Facebook, Google, Instagram, Twitter, and YouTube, canceling all of their ads as a response to US sanctions on Turkey. Turkey went on to say that it would retaliate against the raising of steel and aluminium tariffs by the U.S. administration (The US had already imposed 10 percent and 25 percent additional tariffs on aluminum and steel imports respectively from all countries on March 23, 2018, but on August 13, 2018, it added additional tariffs on steel imports from Turkey). Erdoğan said that Turkey will boycott electronic products from the US, using iPhones as an example. The Keçiören Municipality in the Ankara decided not to issue business licenses to American brands including McDonald's, Starbucks and Burger King. In addition, Turkey decided to increase tariffs on imports of a range of US products,

The Turkish people expected the United States to unequivocally condemn the attack and express solidarity with Turkey's elected leadership. It did not. The United States' reaction was far from satisfactory. Instead of siding with Turkish democracy, United States officials cautiously called for "stability and peace and continuity within Turkey." To make matters worse, there has been no progress regarding Turkey's request for the extradition of Fethullah Gulen under a bilateral treaty.

— Recep Tayyip Erdoğan, Erdogan: How Turkey Sees the Crisis With the U.S. (Aug. 10, 2018), The New York Times

On August 20, 2018, there were gunshots at the USA Embassy in Ankara. No casualties were reported and Turkish authorities detained two men as suspects.

==== Greece (Aegean dispute) ====
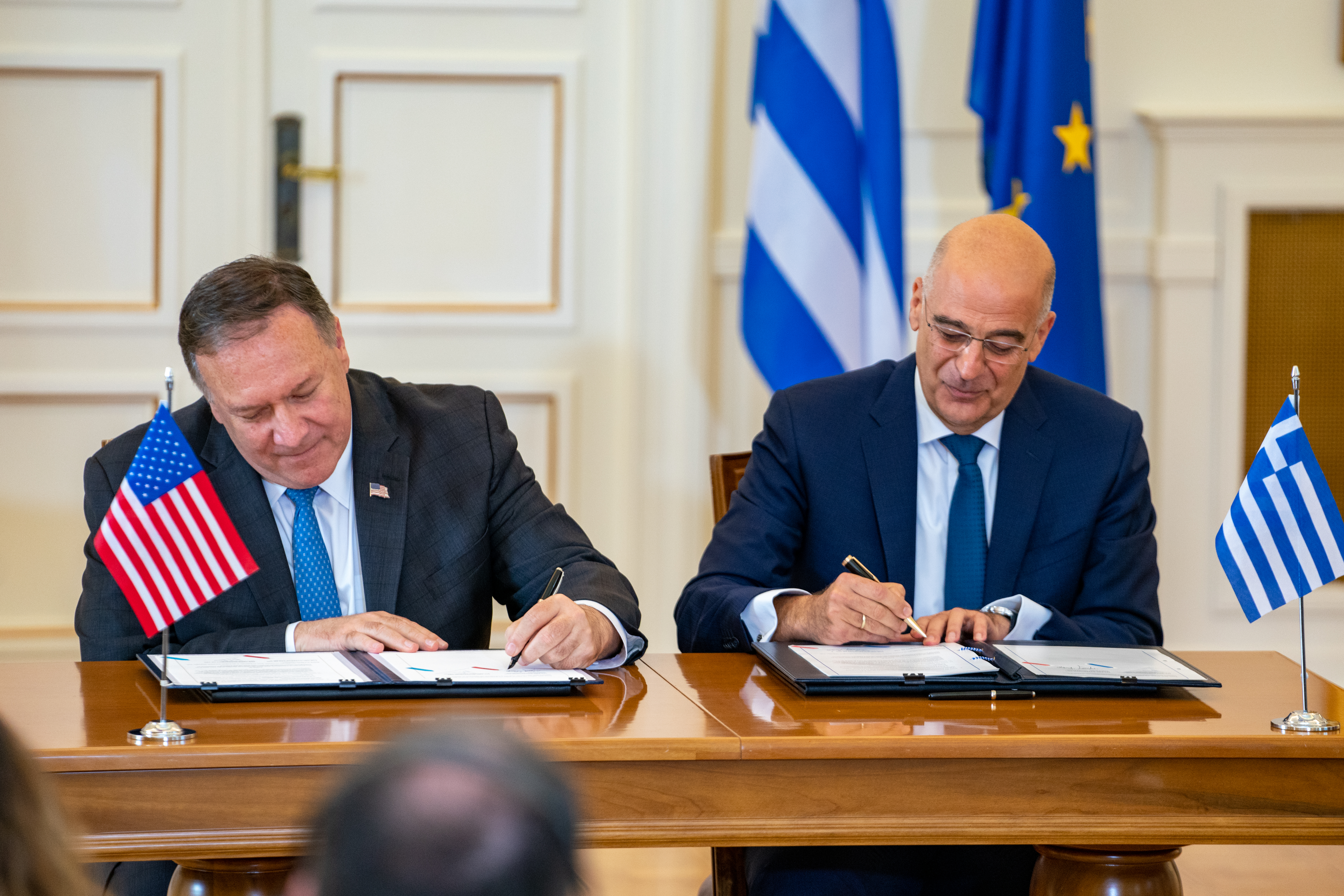
October 5, 2019: Greece Mutual Defense Agreement

Aegean Issues

Israel to replace Russian dominance (NS1, NS2) in EU through Energy Triangle and EastMed pipeline in the eastern Mediterranean Sea. "3+1" grouping (Israel, Greece, Cyprus + U.S.). This "3+1" grouping on energy corridors and planned pipelines could reshape regional power dynamics. The U.S. and Greece signed a "Revised Defense Cooperation Agreement." The agreement was described as critical to responding to new security challenges in the eastern Mediterranean Sea. Pompeo said "We have told the Turks that illegal drilling is unacceptable, and we'll continue to take diplomatic action to make sure that we do as we do always: ensure that the lawful activity takes place in every space where international law governs. ... We're working to get ... everyone to de-escalate and find a set of outcomes that are mutually agreeable,"

In 2021, a new agreement, the "Greek-American Mutual Defense Cooperation Agreement," permitted the US military to use Georgula Barracks in Greece's central province of Volos, Litochoro Training Ground, and army barracks in the northeastern port city of Alexandroupoli, apart from the naval base in Souda Bay in Crete, which the US has been operating since 1969. In short couple years, Turkey saw shifting NATO powers to its western neighbor. Anadolu Agency reported that a growing US military presence in Greece can lead to undesired scenarios in the Aegean: 'Deploying more US troops to Greece would disrupt NATO's powers,' The Aegean dispute is a set of interrelated controversies over sovereignty and related rights in the region of the Aegean Sea. Amb. Pyatt stated that all the islands have the same rights to an EEZ and continental shelf as the mainland does, a claim that is disputed.

==== Palestine (Hamas, World Heritage) ====
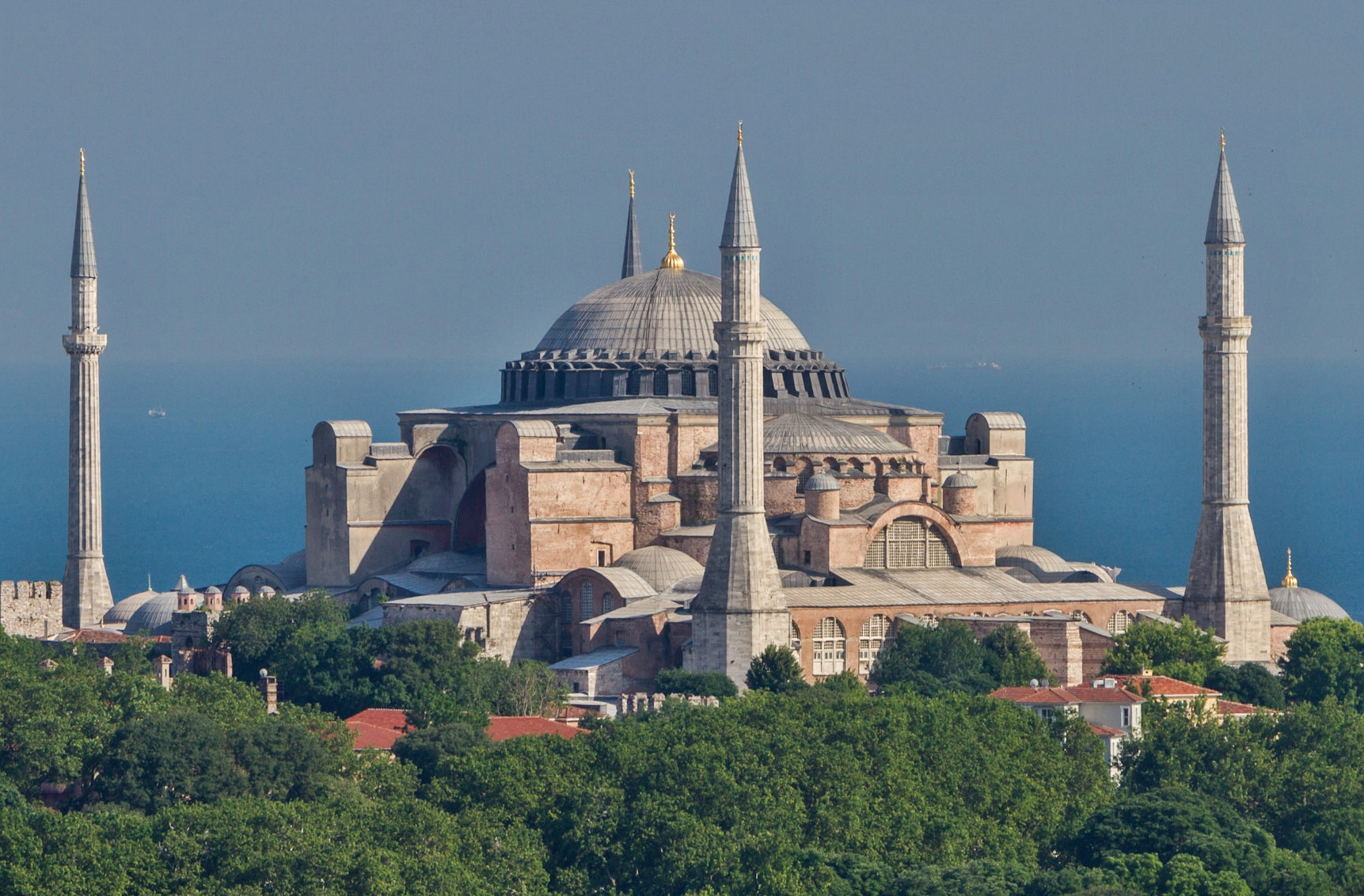
Pompeo: "We urge the Government of Turkey to continue to maintain the Hagia Sophia as a museum, as an exemplar of its commitment to respect the faith traditions and diverse history that contributed to the Republic of Turkey, and to ensure it remains accessible to all" (July 1, 2020).

On the same time, relations between Turkey and the United States also worsened after the Turkish government hosted two Hamas leaders (Turkish support for Hamas) as part of Palestine–Turkey relations.

In 2020, when the Abraham Accords were declared, the Turkish Foreign Ministry stated the accord ignored the Palestinian cause. The Turkish foreign ministry said, "The Palestinian people and administration were right to react strongly against the deal ... With that being the case, there is no credibility in presenting [by the parties] the trilateral declaration as a support to the Palestinian cause". Response: "Leave ... Turkish hypocrisy in criticizing the agreement after already establishing ties with Israel." According to Anadolu Agency, without a Palestine solution, Israel would develop aggressive regional policies.

==== Armenia (Genocide Recognition, Nagorno-Karabakh War) ====
In 2019, the United States Congress, with sponsors from Saudi Arabia, issued official recognition of the Armenian genocide, which was the first time the United States has officially acknowledged the genocide, having previously only unofficially or partially recognized the genocide. Turkey, which has traditionally denied that such genocide existed, blasted the United States for inflaming tensions. Donald Trump has rejected the congressional resolution, stating that his administration's stance on the issue had not changed.

Eliot Engel, chairman of the House Foreign Affairs Committee, called the influence of third party actors like Turkey "troubling" at the 2020 Nagorno-Karabakh conflict. In a letter to Secretary of State Pompeo, Senate Foreign Relations Committee ranking member Bob Menendez, Senate Minority Leader Chuck Schumer, and several other lawmakers called for the Trump administration to "immediately suspend all sales and transfers of military equipment to Ankara." As for the result, relations between the United States to Turkey and Azerbaijan further worsened, with Turkey accused the United States of sending weapons and supplies to Armenia, which Washington denied.

On October 15, 2020, Secretary of State Mike Pompeo urged both sides to respect the humanitarian ceasefire and stated, "We now have the Turks, who have stepped in and provided resources to Azerbaijan, increasing the risk, increasing the firepower that's taking place in this historic fight."

==== Air Defense (Patriot — S-400, F35, CAATSA) ====
Air Defense System

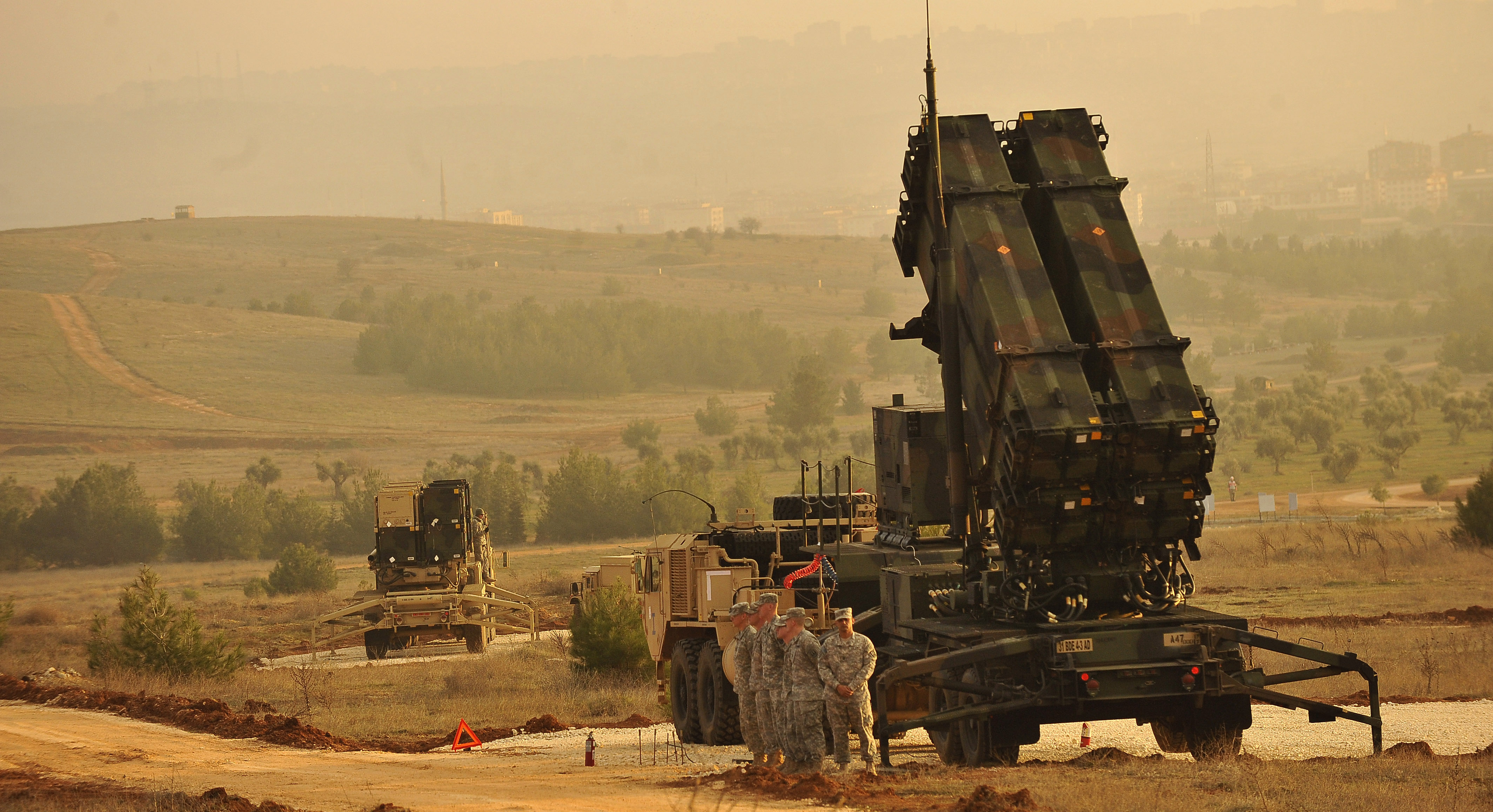
February 4, 2013: US Patriot in Gaziantep.

2015 Russian Sukhoi Su-24 shootdown.

The U.S. had leverage over Turkey. Turkey depended on the U.S. to control its airspace. Turkey has long pursued air-control radars and missile-defense systems. Turkey got serious about acquiring a missile defense system early in the Obama administration. Turkey put in a bid that included the MIM-104 Patriot, which the U.S. had already given to 18 other militaries. In 2013, the U.S. did not part with the Patriots. China's air defense system won in 2013. In 2015, Turkey reversed its position to acquire a long-range air defense missile system China's FD-2000. The Chinese reportedly refused Ankara's demands for long-range air defense technology transfer.

U.S. Patriots that were allocated to the defense of Turkey were removed on August 16, 2015 On November 24, 2015, three months after the Patriots pulled out, Turkey's lack of an air defense system became an issue when 2015 Russian Sukhoi Su-24 shootdown occurred by a patrolling Turkish F-16. Turkey stated it has the right to defend its airspace. Russia claimed the U.S. knew the flight path of the Sukhoi Su-24, and it was an issue between two NATO partners; two U.S. officials claimed there was no such information.

Primary motivation. Turkey had no way to defend it other than patrolling the border with F-16s. Secondary motivation. The Turkish Speaker of the House gave the response: Starting around 2015-2016, the U.S. began arming the YPG in Syria. Turkish parliament interpreted the U.S. as seeking to establish a new state, a "terror corridor," along Turkey's southern border. Turkey responded with due diligence to this U.S. stance. We got what we can. Tertiary motivation. Turkey wanted the S-400 for the same reason that the U.S. did not approve it. The 2016 Turkish coup d'état attempt added another major point of tension. An unexpected outcome was that several rebel F-16s targeted the presidential jet and bombed the parliament. Turkey wanted to protect its parliament, even by shooting down aircraft operated by the Turkish Air Force, if necessary.

Syrian Safe Zones

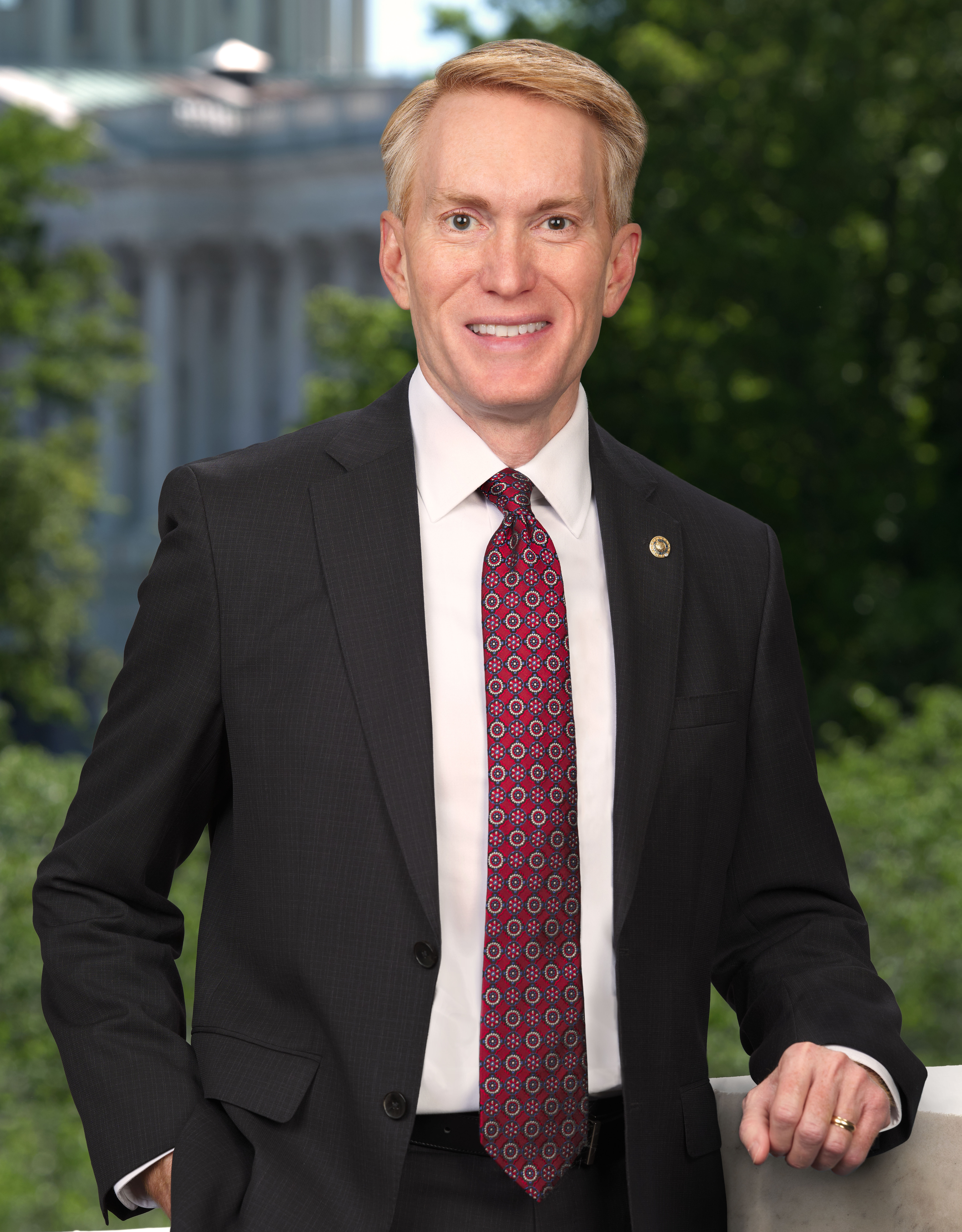
Hollen: Turkey has drifted as an ally

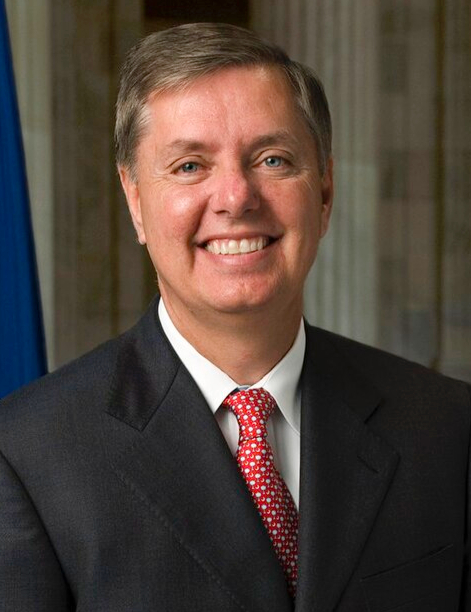
Graham: Suspension from NATO

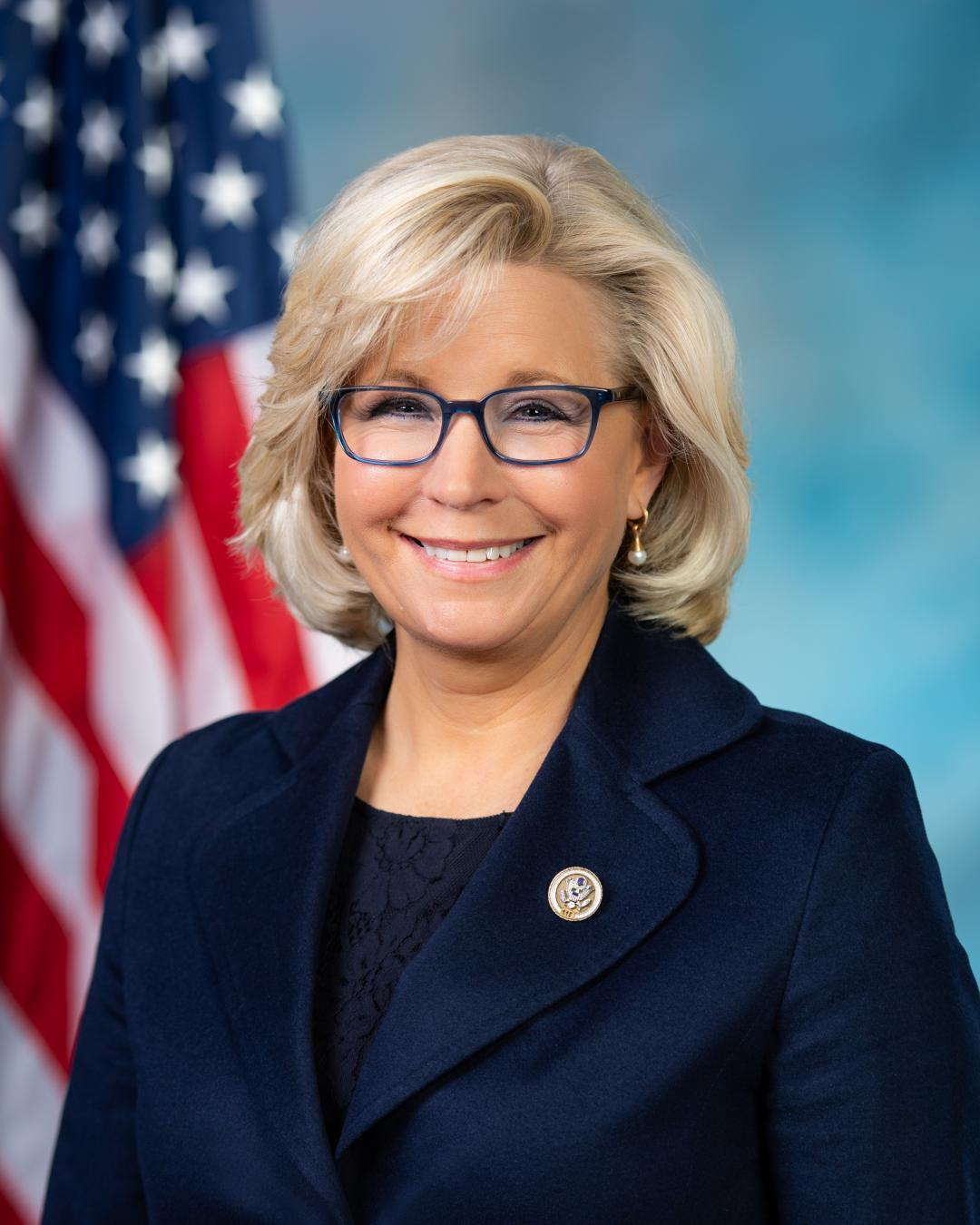
Cheney: We consider the costs of having to go back into situations [Syria] where we've withdrawn from.

H.R.4692 and S.2644

In 2017, Erdoğan said, "They give tanks, cannons and armored vehicles to the terror organization, but we can't procure some of our needs, although we want to pay the price." Turkey, a NATO member since 1952, reportedly saw that Russian technology transfer was available. Turkey transferred the money for the S-400 missile system on September 12, 2017. Bloomberg reported "permission" of the sale of Patriot systems to Turkey as a breakthrough on December 18, 2018. Just short of six months after the U.S. breakthrough, Turkey received its first installment of the Russian S-400 missile defense system on July 12, 2019. The patriots were offered to replace Russian ordinance was US$3.5 billion while Turkey paid US$2.5 billion for S-400m.

Bilateral relations between Turkey and the United States further deteriorated after the passage of the National Defense Authorization Act for Fiscal Year 2019, with an amendment added by Senator John McCain requiring the Trump administration to submit a detailed report to Congress on the status of U.S.–Turkey relations. The Department of Defense (DOD) submitted a mostly classified report to Congress in November 2018; before the presentation, McCain passed away, and H.R. 648 (the Consolidated Appropriations Act, 2019) required the DOD to submit a report on the issue in 2019.

On May 22, 2019, the U.S. threatened Turkey with Countering America's Adversaries Through Sanctions Act (CAATSA) over Turkey's decision to buy the S-400 missile defense system from Russia. CAATSA was established against Russia, Iran and North Korea. AIPAC played a central role in shaping congressional sentiment with the tagline "Turkey Shift Away!" from Western and Israeli alignment.

Turkey was also excluded from the F-35 Joint Strike Fighter program on July 17, 2019, citing risks that a potential Russian intelligence-gathering platform could connect to NATO networks through advanced radar and sensor systems. On July 31, 2019, the United States decided to end the F-35 deal. The Pentagon also cited risks associated with the connection of a potential Russian intelligence-gathering platform with advanced radars and sensors to NATO's networks, and the possibility that it could be secretly used by Russia to obtain information about the F-35's stealth characteristics such as its radar signature.Acting Defense Secretary Patrick M. Shanahan had warned Turkey that such a deal with Russia risks undermining its ties to NATO. Turkey was a level-3 partner, building 900 parts for the F-35. Turkey had over 100 jets on advance order. Turkey also had 4 jets already paid for and produced for Turkish pilot training. Under Secretary of Defense for Acquisition Ellen Lord and Deputy Under Secretary of Defense for Policy David Trachtenberg were in a rare public discussion: "Turkey cannot field a Russian intelligence collection platform in proximity to where the F-35 program makes repairs and houses the F-35." Turkey, on multiple occasions, said, "We are not going to link or work these systems together. Turkey said Turkish personnel will man the S-400s. Various Russian advisors and technicians would be based in Turkey for training and maintenance. Finally, the U.S. said: "It has the power to keep the planes from moving to Turkish soil." Turkish pilots and maintenance personnel training in the U.S. were sent home the same day. 1914 dispute. The Turks were reminded of a historical parallel: the Reşadiye-class battleships were paid for, but shortly after World War I began, the British Royal Navy seized them. Germany replaced them with two new cruisers. Germany gave ships to the Ottomans to distance them from Britain. It became an important factor for the Ottoman entry into World War I. Israel lobbied to drop Turkey from F-35 program. Israel used its behind-the-scenes influence to push the decision forward because excluding Turkey downgraded its military edge.

On October 17, 2019, Congress passed sanctions H.R.4692 and S.2644 as a response to Syrian safe zones. Congress restricted the sale of U.S. goods, services, or technology to the TAF. The U.S. penalized foreign entities, non-U.S. companies, that sold energy used by the TAF (jet fuel, diesel, batteries, etc.). The U.S. imposed sanctions on Halkbank for TAF-related transactions. The same transaction ban also extended to foreign financial institutions. The President (Recep Tayyip Erdoğan) and Vice President (Fuat Oktay) faced visa bans, and the U.S. froze their assets.

CAATSA

Chairman Risch: "I am very glad to see that Turkey has finally been sanctioned.

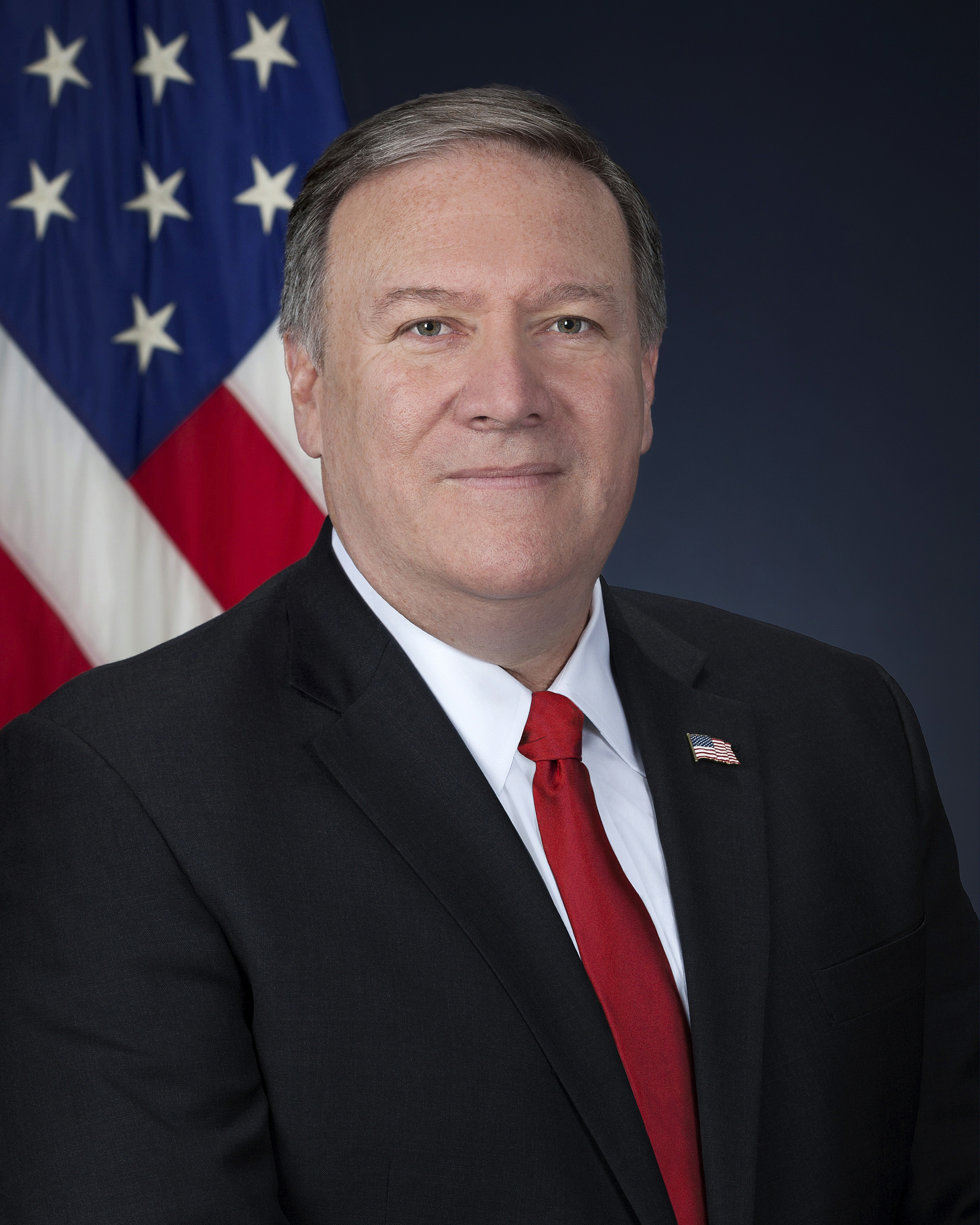
... purchase of the S-400 system would endanger the security of U.S. military technology and personnel and provide substantial funds to Russia's defense sector, as well as Russian access to the Turkish armed forces and defense industry

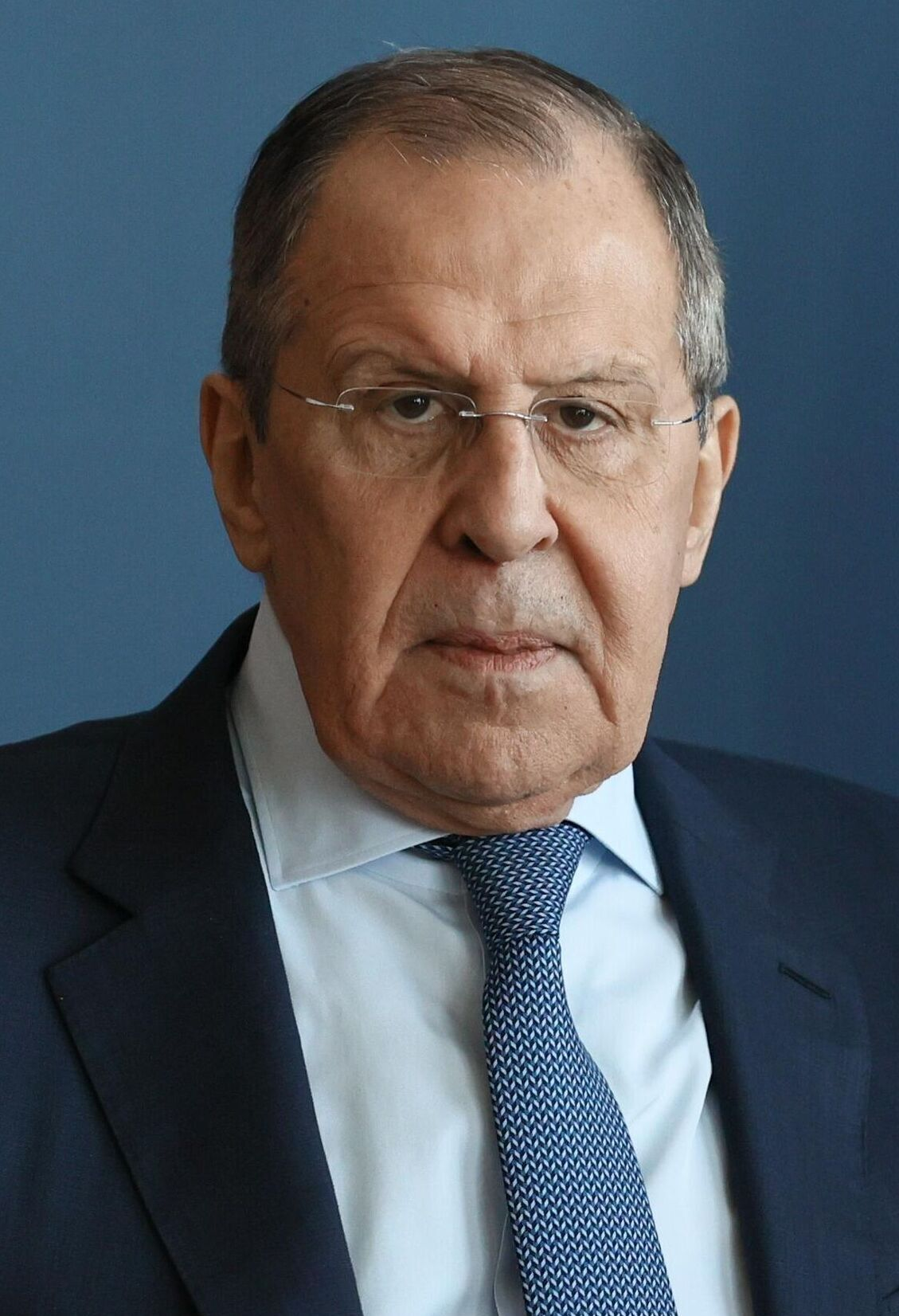
I do not think this does any favors to the United States' international reputation as a responsible participant in international negotiations, including in military-technical cooperation.

On February 5, 2020, the U.S. halted a secretive military intelligence cooperation program with Turkey against the PKK. On December 8, 2020, the House of Representatives approved a sanctions package against Turkey due to its purchase of the S-400 missile system from Russia. Rosoboronexport, a Russian state agency on the CAATSA sanctions list. The National Defense Authorization Act for Fiscal Year 2020 (NDAA), which also included sanctions against the TurkStream pipeline, was passed by a large majority of 335 votes. The Trump administration said the president would veto the bill. Trump had earlier worked to delay sanctions against Turkey; because of the majority, the president lacked the authority to delay its passage.

On October 2, 2020, House majority-minority leaders and Senate Foreign Relations Committee ranking member Bob Menendez, along with other senators, suspended all sales and transfers of advanced military equipment to Ankara. The U.S. Congress used its power to block sales and began slowrolling for the proposed sale of 40 new F-16Vs and 79 upgrade kits to Turkey, as well as the sale of LHTEC T800 engines for TAI/AgustaWestland T129 ATAK attack helicopters produced by Turkey, which could not be exported to any third country without obtaining an export license for these engines from the Congress.

On December 14, 2020, the U.S. government decided to apply sanctions on Turkey, a NATO member, for disregarding the CAATSA law of 2017, following Ankara's decision to purchase the S-400 missile system from Russia. On December 14, 2020, the U.S. imposed CAATSA, which President Donald Trump signed into law as part of the NDAA. Sanctions included export restrictions. It completely banned all U.S. export licenses and technology authorizations granted to the SSB. Sanctions included financial restrictions. It prohibited loans or credit from U.S. financial institutions and automatically extended to international financial institutions. Every U.S. agency had to vote against or oppose loans from international financial institutions. The financial branch also ordered a halt to assistance from the U.S. Export-Import Bank. Full asset freezes and U.S. visa restrictions on Dr. Ismail Demir, SSB's president, and other SSB officers, Serhat Gencoglu, Mustafa Alper Deniz, and Faruk Yigit. Before the passage of the bill, on July 22, 2019, Turkey claimed to retaliate against the "unacceptable" threat of U.S. sanctions over Turkey's purchase of Russian S-400 missile defenses. The U.S. also imposed restrictions against the Turkish Defence Industry Agency. Turkey remininded the U.S. that there were other key partners agreed to purchase. On December 14, 2019, Christopher Ashley Ford said, "We hope that other countries around the world will also take note that the United States will fully implement CAATSA Section 231 sanctions, and that they should avoid further acquisitions of Russian equipment, especially those that could trigger sanctions." In February 2019, Russia had an advance supply contract with Saudi Arabia for the S-400, Qatar was in "advanced" talks with Russia for the S-400, and India agreed to pay more than $5 billion for five S-400 squadrons to be delivered in 2023. In 2026, India received all five squadrons. The U.S. adopted a policy of "silent non-determination" regarding for India's S-400 procurement. The Khanna-Gaetz Amendment. The Khanna-Gaetz was a signal to Turkey greater Turkish distancing from NATO.

Subsequently, several international policy analysts questioned whether military sanctions on the NATO ally would weaken the alliance, effectively reducing Turkey's ability to obtain American technology for regional defense. Trump lost the 2020 United States presidential election. For this reason, the incoming Biden administration would likely hold off on sanctions to normalize relations.

=== Biden administration (2021–2025) ===
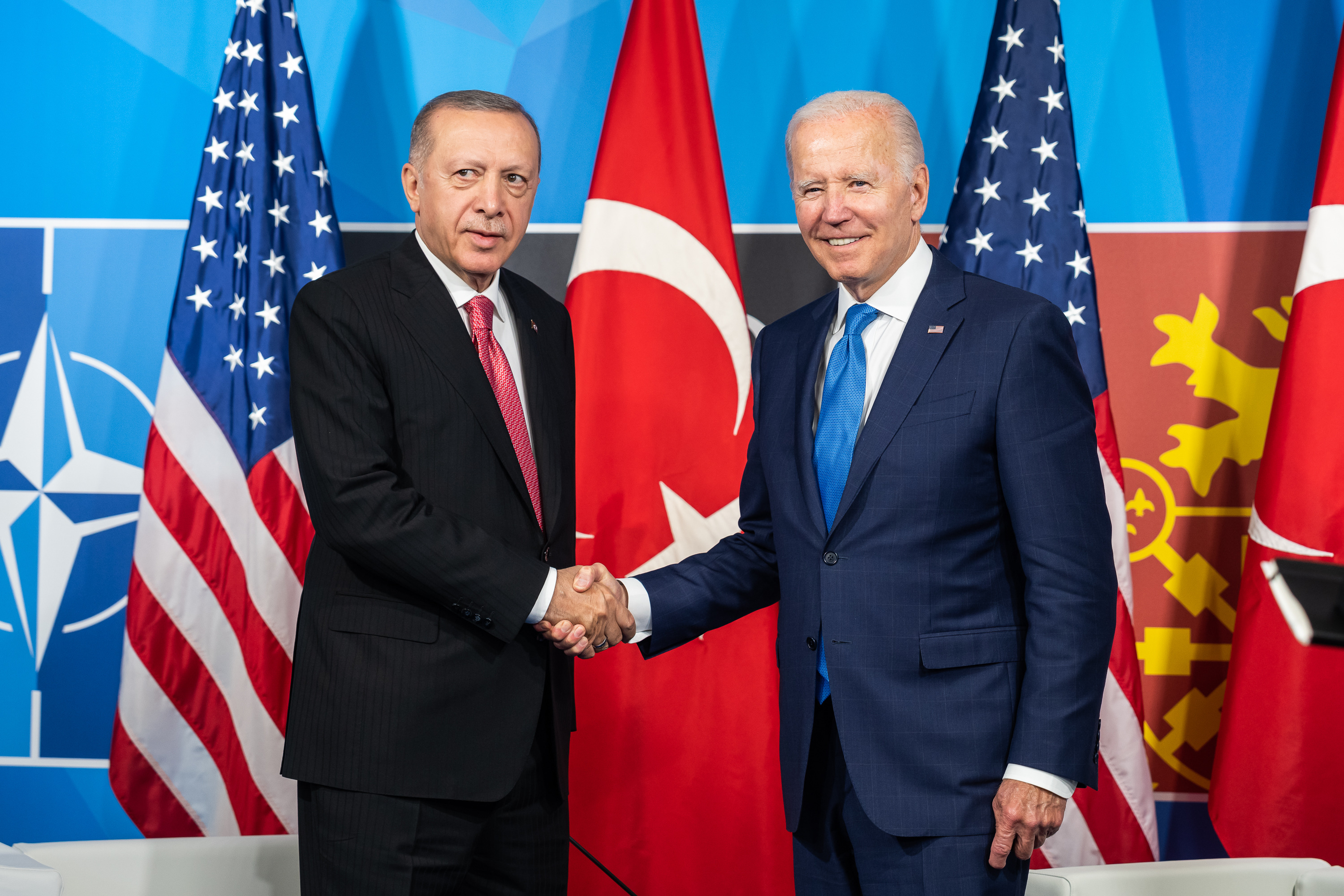
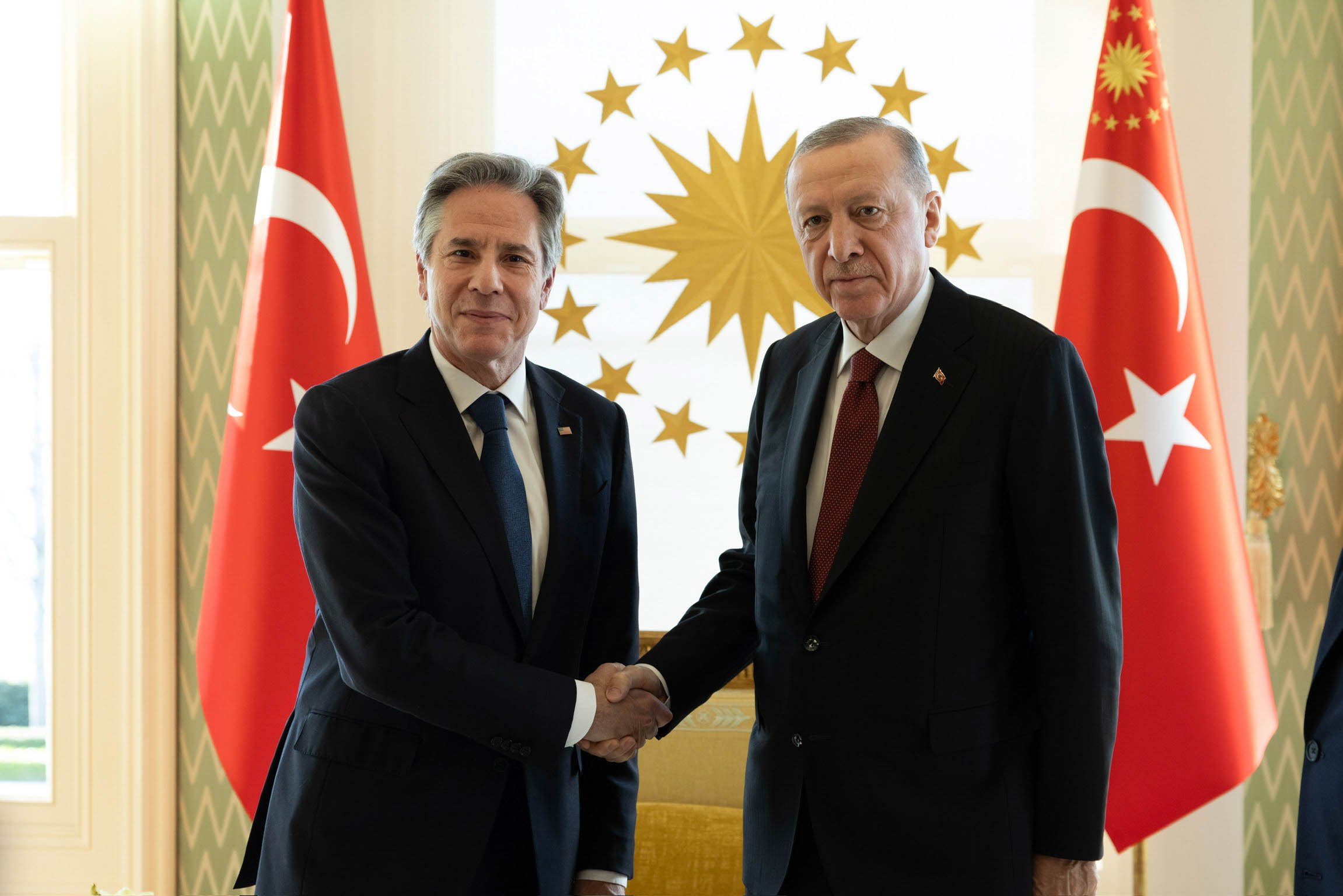
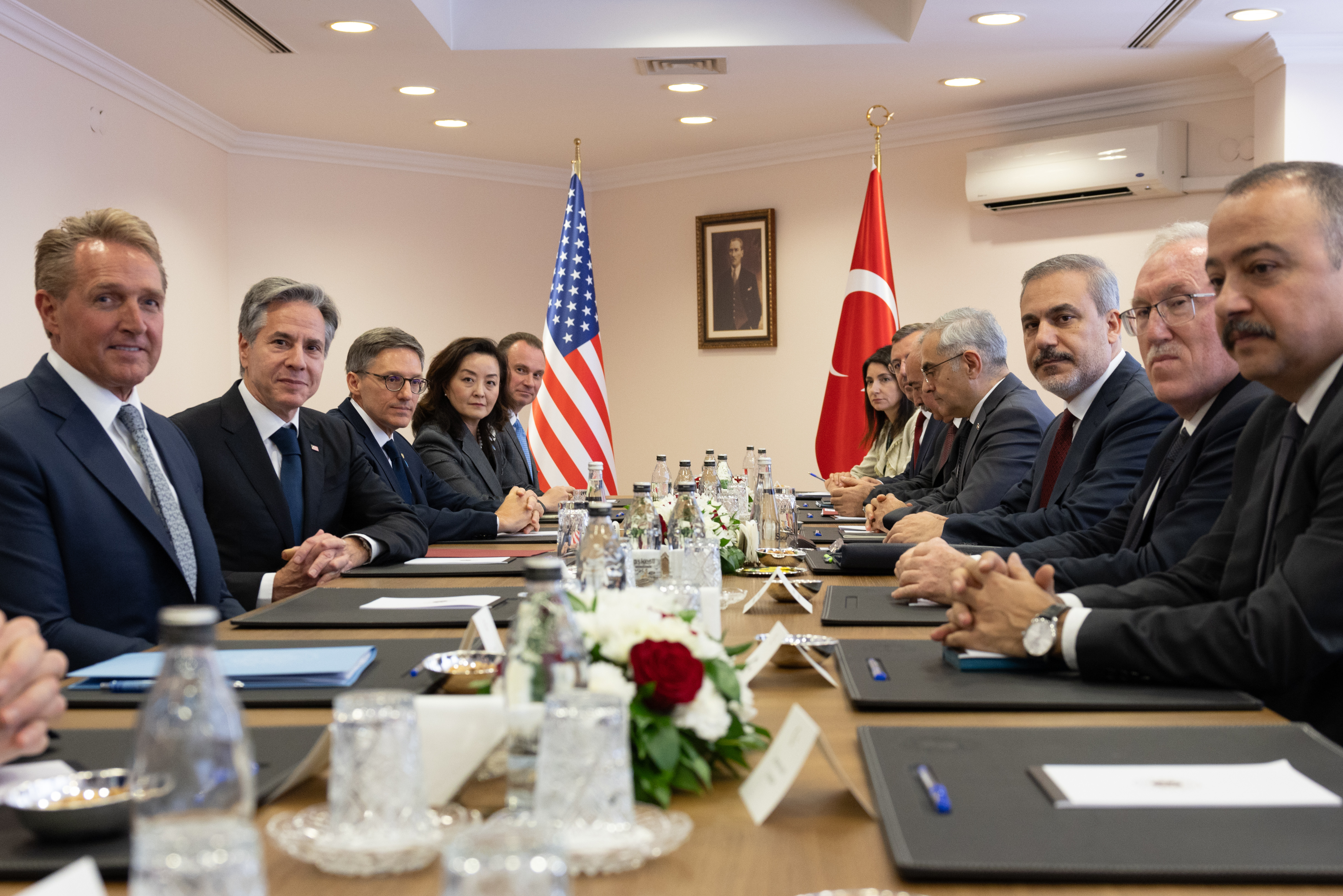
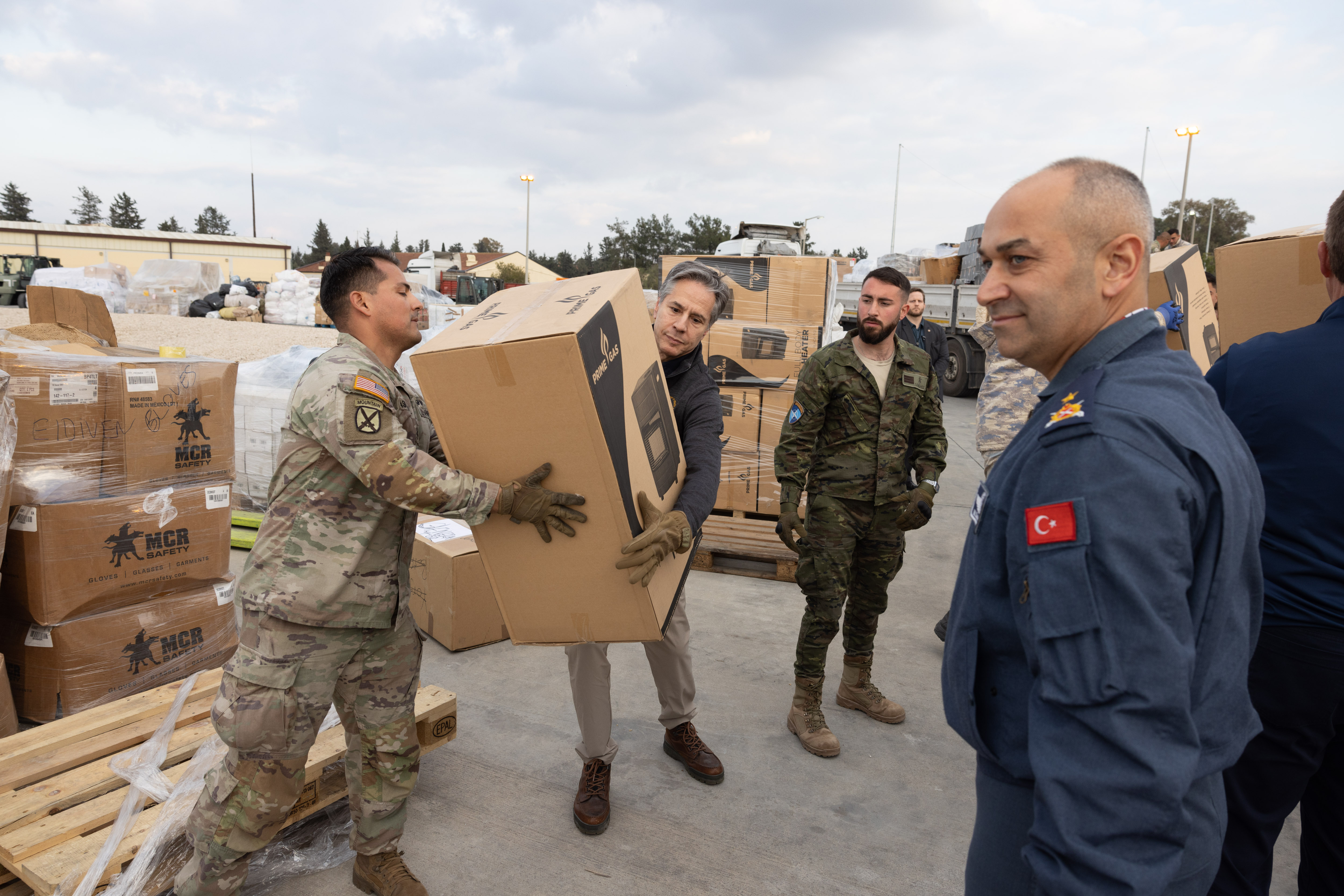
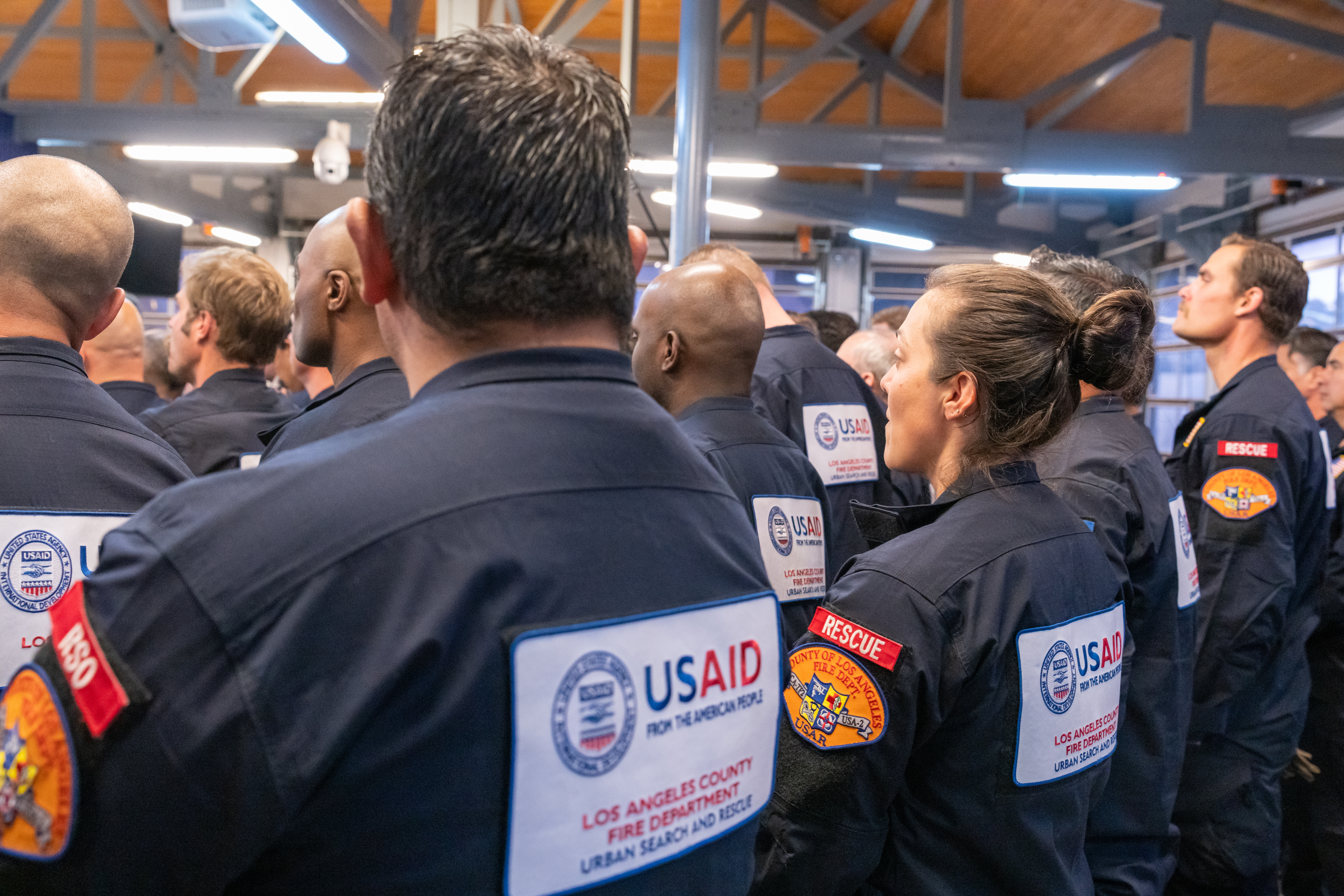

In August 2020, Democratic presidential nominee Joe Biden called for a new U.S. approach to the "autocrat" President Erdoğan and support for Turkish opposition parties.

So I'm very concerned about it. I'm very concerned about it. But I'm still of the view that if we were to engage more directly like I was doing with them, that we can support those elements of the Turkish leadership that still exist and get more from them and embolden them to be able to take on and defeat Erdogan. Not by a coup, not by a coup, but by the electoral process.

— Joe Biden, "Interview Transcript: Joe Biden Says Age Is Just a Number", The New York Times,

Biden calls Erdogan "Autocrat"

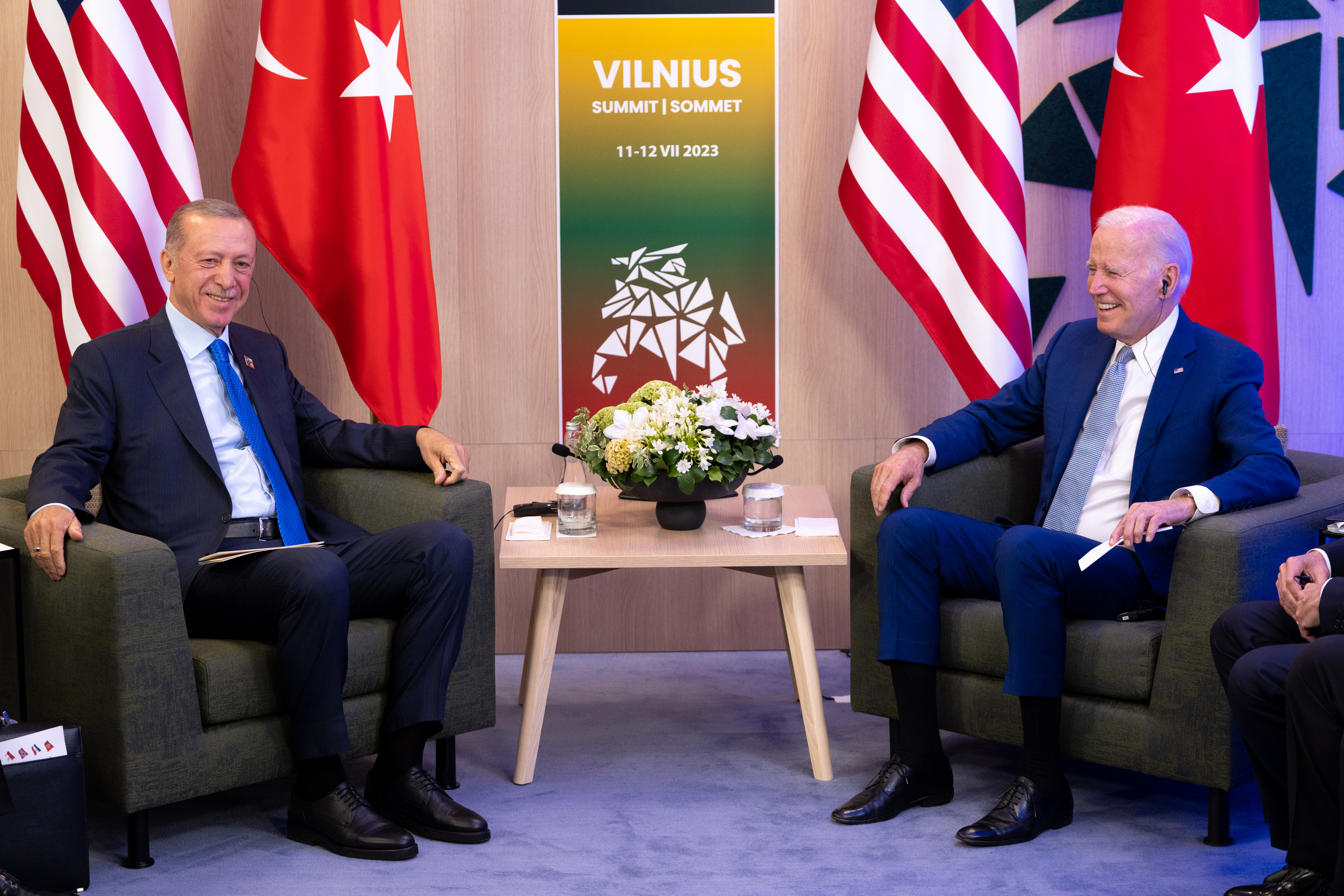
Erdoğan: "To take this opportunity to wish you the best of luck. (upcoming U.S. election which ended at withdrawal)"
Biden: "I look forward to meeting with you the next five years. (upcoming Turkish election)"

On May 22, 2022, after the US embassy issued a warning that police might respond violently to an opposition gathering in Istanbul, Turkey's foreign relations ministry summoned Ambassador Jeff Flake.

In October 2021, in the wake of the appeal for the release of Turkish activist Osman Kavala signed by 10 Western countries, Turkish president Recep Tayyip Erdoğan ordered his foreign minister to declare the US ambassador persona non grata, alongside the other 9 ambassadors. However, the ambassadors did not receive any formal notice to leave the country and Erdoğan eventually stepped back.

==== Russia (Russo-Ukrainian War, Grain Deal, Truce) ====
In the Russo-Ukrainian War, the US supported Ukraine and sanctioned Russia; however, the conflict brought challenges to Turkey in balancing its relations with both Ukraine and Russia, with implications for US-Turkey ties.

Russo-Ukrainian War and peace negotiations

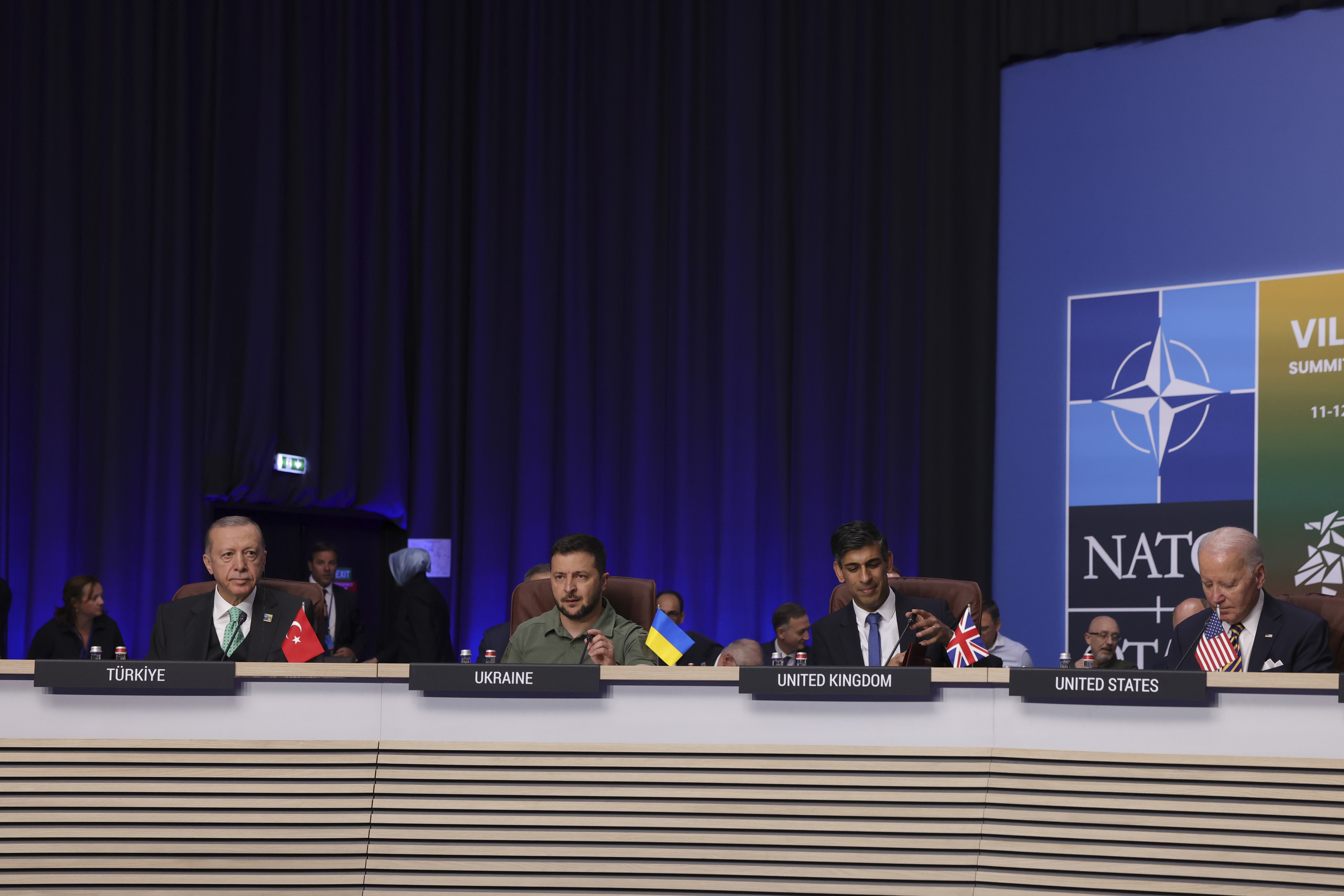
Erdogan, Zelenskyy, Sunak and Biden

Black Sea Grain Initiative

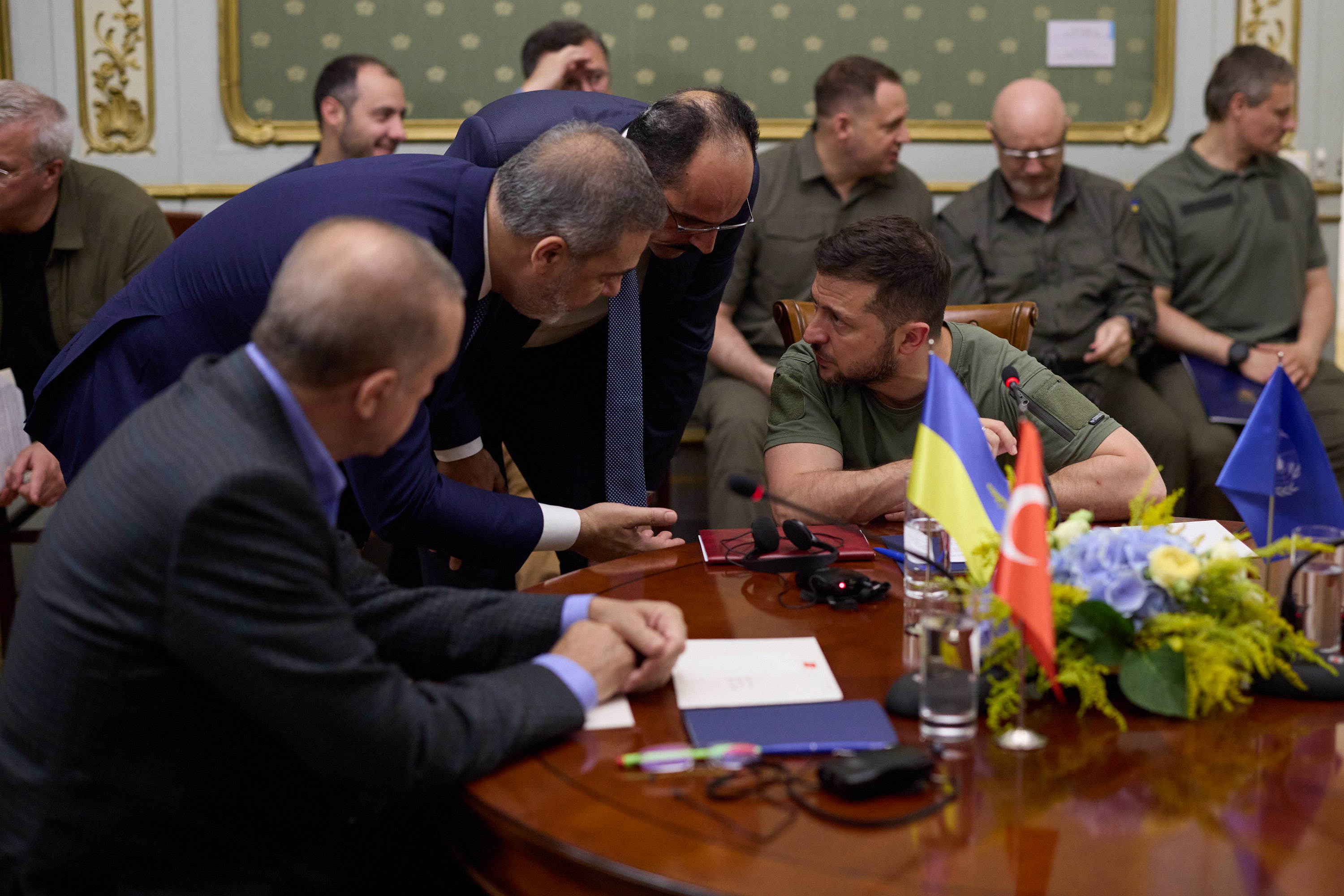
Erdogan, Zelenskyy, Fidan

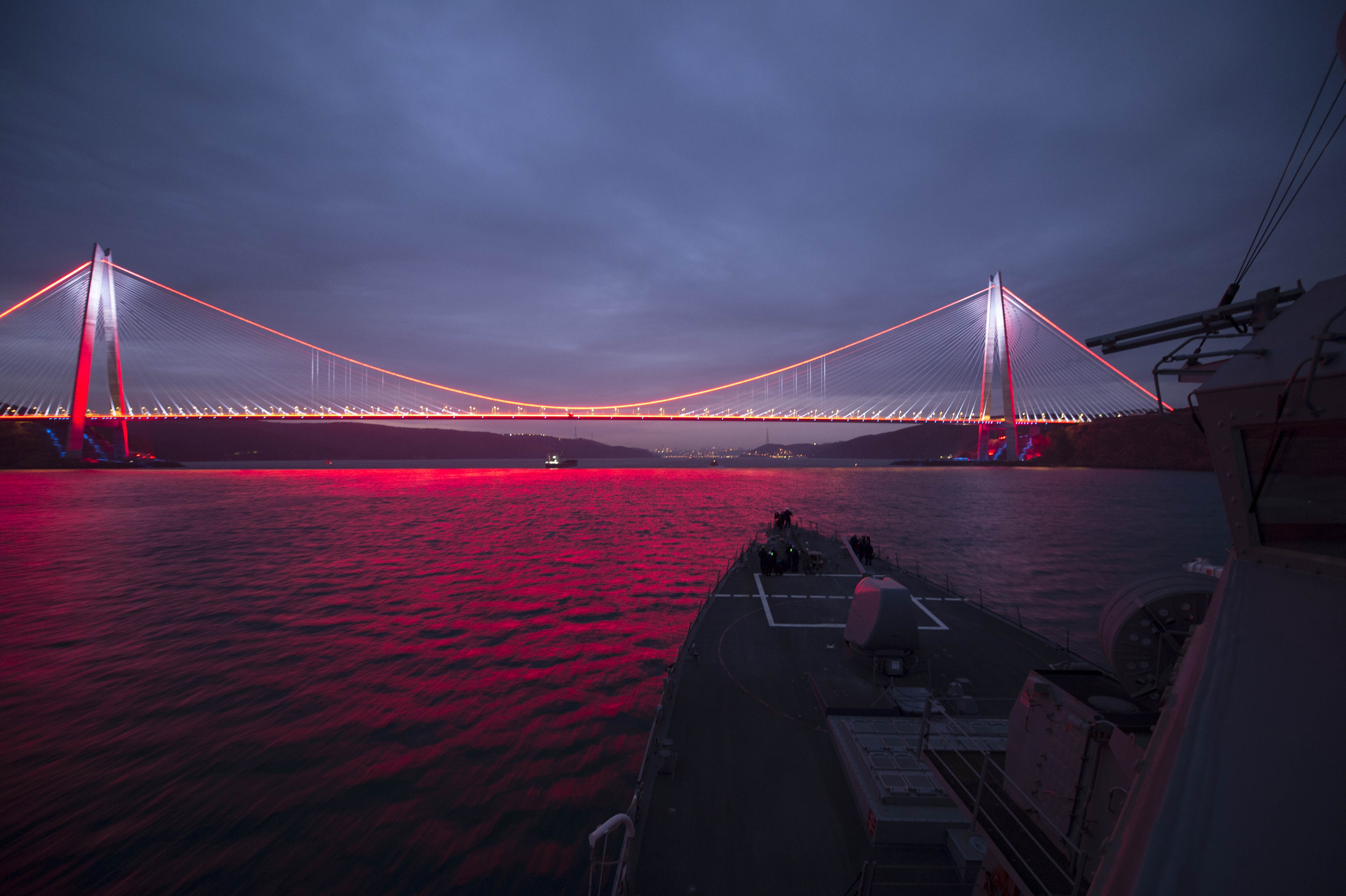
The Istanbul Communique: The Talks That Could Have Ended the War

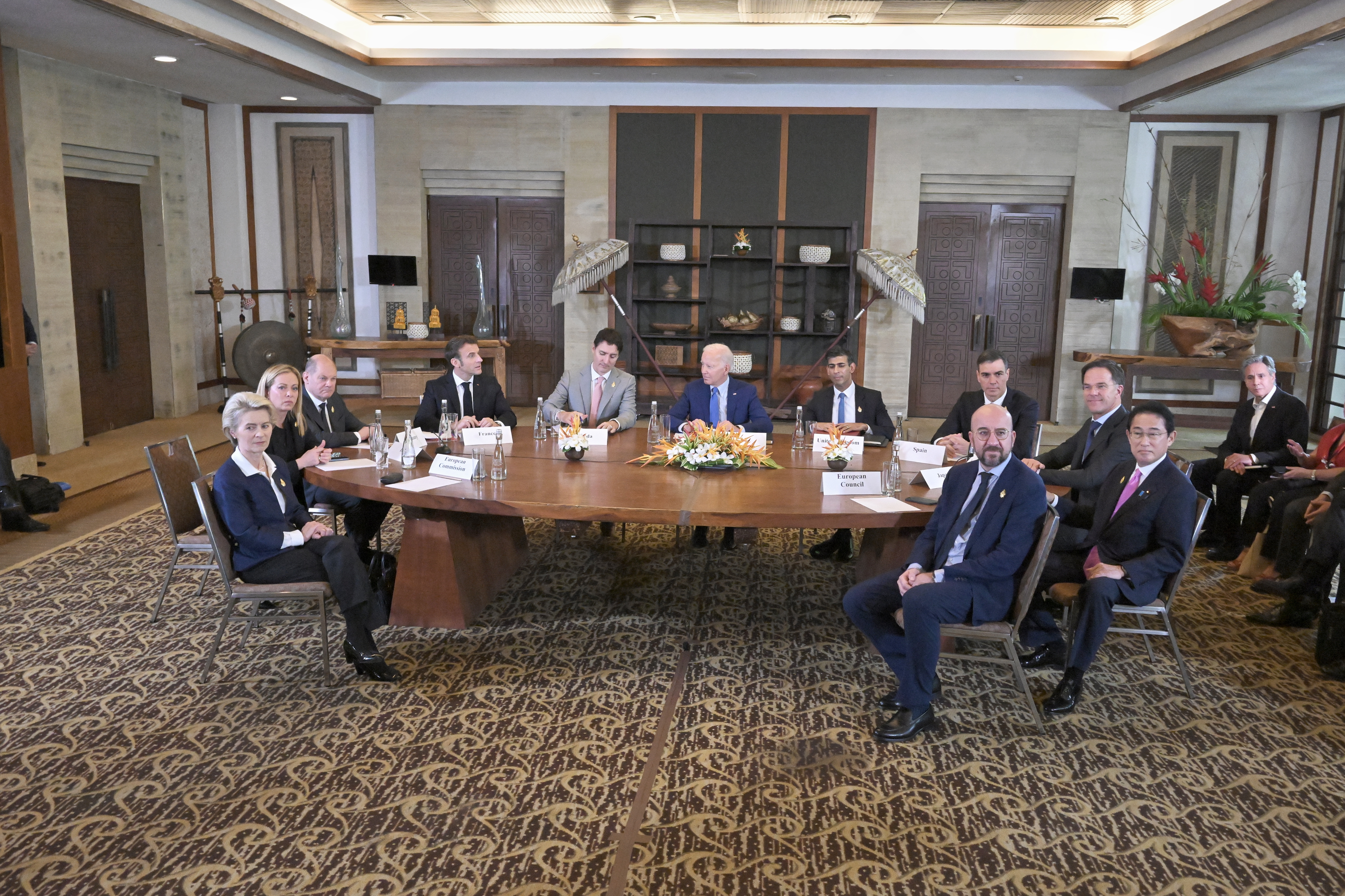
Complex dynamics: "Emergency Meeting" with NATO in G20 Bali. Erdogan was left uninformed/snub/forgotten in the hotel room.

Turkey, in addition to denouncing Russia's invasion and closing the Straits to belligerent warships (including US warships), supplied Ukraine with various types of military equipment—including armed drone aircraft and mine-resistant ambush-resistant (MRAP) vehicles—as well as humanitarian assistance. Turkey-Ukraine close ties was a response to mutual interests in countering Russian influence (they are also part of Organization of the Black Sea Economic Cooperation) in the Black Sea region and in sharing military technology to expand and increase the self-sufficiency of their respective defense industries. "Bayraktar" is the Ukrainian patriotic military propaganda song which parodies both the Russian Armed Forces and the invasion itself.

Turkey's basis for continued engagement with Russia, and its desire to help mediate the conflict, was to minimize spillover effects on Turkey's national security and economy. On March 5, 2022, the Turkish Foreign Ministry stated after discussions with NATO partners' deputy foreign ministers that Turkey and the US will continue to work in "tight coordination" to find a diplomatic solution to Russia's invasion of Ukraine. On the other hand, Turkey rejected the US economic sanctions against Russia and did not close its airspace to Russian civilian flights. In April 2022, Russia and Ukraine were on the verge of signing a peace agreement in Istanbul, with the Turkish Government acting as mediator. March 2022 British Prime Minister Boris Johnson forced Ukraine not to sign the peace deal in Istanbul. October 2022, Erdoğan said Putin "is now more open to possible peace talks" and Ukraine "was not rejecting such peace talks"

President Biden expressed consent for Turkey and the United Nations to develop parallel agreements with Russia and Ukraine to provide a Black Sea corridor for Ukrainian grain exports to address global supply concerns. The Black Sea Grain Initiative was achieved by Turkey as it regulates access to the Turkish Straits through the Montreux Convention Regarding the Regime of the Straits, so by virtue of its strategic position, it has the power to mediate between the parties on various issues of contention.

==== Greece (Aegean dispute, Cyprus–Turkey maritime zones dispute) ====
Cyprus–Turkey

Cyprus-Turkey

CRS Report & US Position

Devlet Bahçeli claimed US bases pose "a threat to our security." "America is using the Greek side as a pawn ... The subject of 12 islands is our wound that has not yet healed. They have been unjustly usurped from Turkey by foot tricks", Bahçeli reiterated. Erdoğan suspended dialogue with Greek Prime Minister Kyriakos Mitsotakis after Mitsotakis appeared to raise concern about the possible sale of 40 new F-16Vs to Turkey, while addressing a May 2022 joint session of the U.S. Congress.

The Cyprus–Turkey maritime zones dispute is a major contention in the region. For the U.S., Israel, the Republic of Cyprus and Greece, the claimed EEZ of Greece, which extends to the East Mediterranean thanks to the small island of Kastellorizo near Anatolia, is promoted as ensuring stability, economic development, and regional integration, especially regarding Israel's interests and concerns. The multilateral “3+1” initiative consisting of Israel, Cyprus and Greece, and supported by the United States, aims to diversify Europe's energy supplies through the Leviathan gas field off the coast of Israel in the East Mediterranean. However, it ruled out Turkey's position regarding its own EEZ in the region, which conflicts with the claim by Greece. In Turkey's view, the Greek islands close to Anatolia do not provide a contiguous maritime border between Greece and Turkey, especially in the area between Rhodes and Kastellorizo, which are 78 miles apart, when the maximum internationally recognized limit for a contiguous maritime border claim is 12 miles (the 1923 Treaty of Lausanne was signed in a period when national territorial waters were limited to 3 miles). Turkey responded to its exclusion from the "3+1" initiative by signing the Libya (GNA)–Turkey maritime deal.

==== Palestine (Hamas, Peace talks) ====
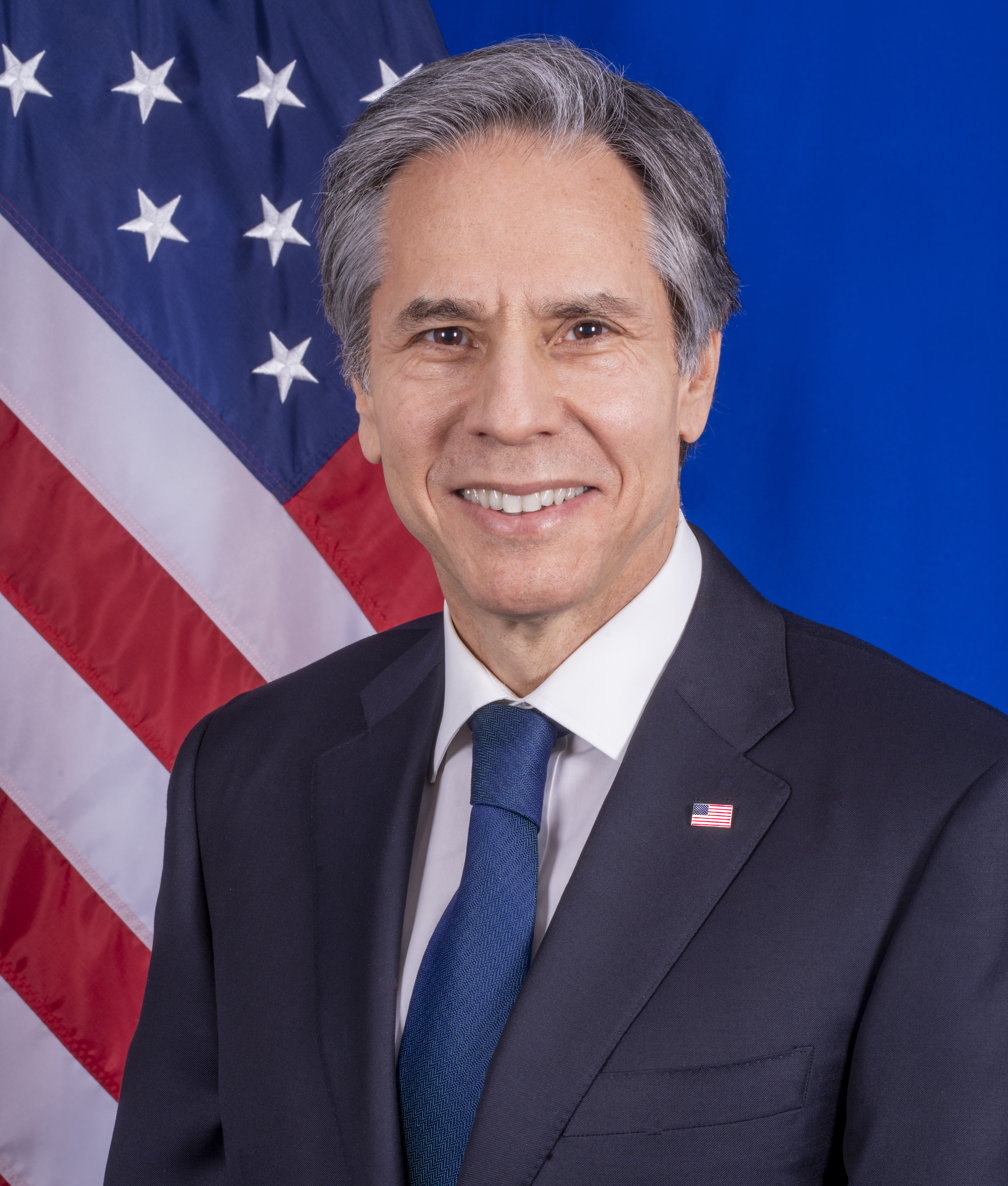
May 2021: DoS: "We condemned Erdogan’s anti-Semitic comments"

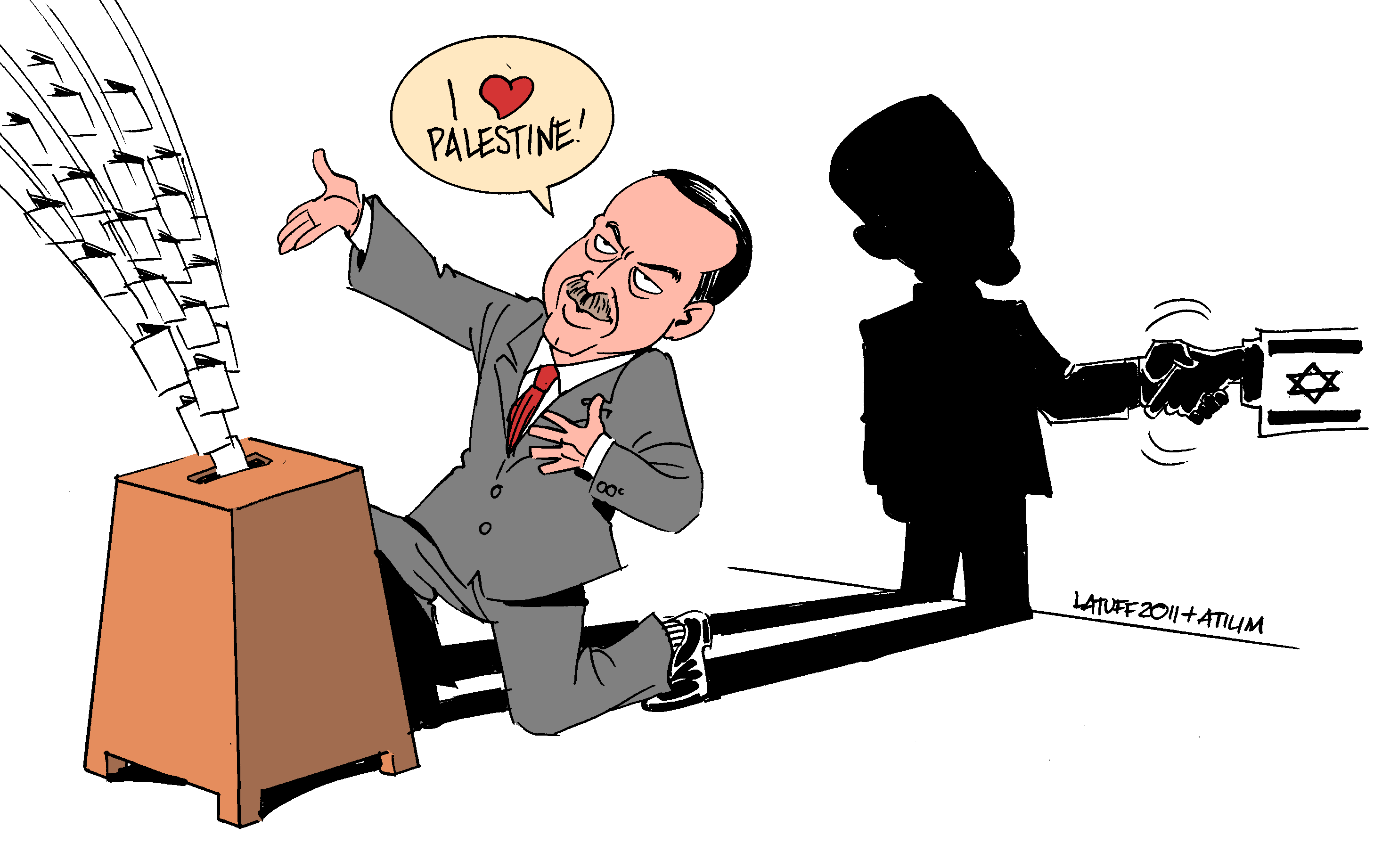
May 19, 2021: Erdogan, via spokesperson, "Enabling an apartheid regime in its repression of innocent people in occupied territories and then turning around and blaming others who call it out is the height of hypocrisy.”

On May 18, 2021, the United States is deeply committed to combating anti-Semitism in all of its forms, and must always counter lies with facts and answer crimes of hate with justice, condemning Erdogan's anti-Semitic comments. The official response was made by the Turkish foreign office, not by Erdogan's office. The clarification was as follows: "The concept of anti-Semitism should not be exploited in order to exempt the current Israeli government from criticism, or provide it with impunity from systematic ethnic, religious and cultural cleansing policies as well as attacks against the Palestinian people by the current Israeli Administration in the occupied Palestinian territories."

On October 7, 2023, Turkish support for Hamas changed position following the October 7 attacks. The Turkish government asked the members of Hamas to leave the country after pictures and videos of the terrorist attacks began to be published and broadcast by the international media. Hamas leader Ismail Haniyeh and other top officials were “politely sent away.” On October 9, 2023, Blinken posted on X: "I encouraged Türkiye's advocacy for a cease-fire and the release of all hostages held by Hamas immediately." After protests from Israel, Blinken decided to delete his tweet which called for a cease-fire in the 2023 Gaza war. On October 25, 2023, Turkey changed position once again following reports of the "humanitarian tragedy in the Gaza Strip", and in Erdoğan's words, Hamas was now "protecting its land and people".

External videos
- DW News: State visit
- Scholz & Erdogan (NATO partners (U.S.) Antisemitism claims 31:50)

In 2024, Erdoğan and the AKP government in Turkey promoted the position that Hamas needs to be part of the political process. On November 18, 2024, the United States warned Turkey against harboring Hamas leaders.

==== Israel (Normalization, Gaza War, NATO) ====
After the previous rupture in 2010, multiple U.S. administrations worked to put the relationship between two key allies back on track. A hot conflict between these two U.S. allies would almost certainly take the Israel-Turkey relationship across the rubicon of reparability, which in turn could trigger unresolvable problems for U.S.-Turkey relations. Erdoğan and Netanyahu met for the first time in person at the United Nations headquarters in New York City on September 20, 2023. They were slowly improving ties strained by disputes over Israel's policies toward the Palestinians. Following the handshake of the leaders, Israel's media reported an upcoming visit by Erdoğan to Israel, with a pilgrimage to the Al-Aqsa Mosque. The promise of cooperation on energy was the main topic. Israeli gas would be supplied to Europe through Turkey. If achieved, the pipeline would also enable Israel to become a transit route for additional supplies of natural gas to Europe from Egypt, Saudi Arabia and the United Arab Emirates.

Turkey blocked cooperation between NATO and Israel by opposing to the Western [U.S.] position, stating that the alliance should not support Israel's Gaza war, which would be a violation of NATO's founding principles. Turkey stated that the cooperation between NATO and Israel could continue only after an end to the conflict.

On September 6, 2024, Turkish-American human rights activist Ayşenur Ezgi Eygi was shot in the head by an Israel Defense Forces (IDF) sniper during a protest against illegal Israeli settlements in Beita, Nablus, in the West Bank. Turkish President Recep Tayyip Erdogan described the killing by Israel as "barbaric". Relations between Turkey and Israel, a major ally of the United States, continued to deteriorate.

A Pew Research poll in 2024 showed that 85% of Turks were dissatisfied with the way the U.S. president, Joe Biden, handled the Israel's war in Gaza.

==== Armenia (Nagorno-Karabakh conflict, Normalization) ====
Presidential candidate and former Vice President Joe Biden demanded that Turkey "stay out" of the Nagorno-Karabakh conflict between Armenia and Azerbaijan, in which Turkey has supported the Azerbaijanis.

On December 15, 2021, U.S. Secretary of State Antony Blinken announced that the U.S. supports the normalization process between Armenia and Turkey.

==== Genocide (Armenian, Uyghur, Gaza) ====
Genocides

Gaza

Armenian

On October 27, 2020, the U.S. Senate designated the persecution of Uyghurs in China's Xinjiang autonomous region as genocide. On January 19, 2021, incoming U.S. president Joe Biden's secretary of state nominee Antony Blinken was asked, and he contended, "That would be my judgment as well."

On April 24, 2021, Armenian Genocide Remembrance Day, President Joe Biden referred to the massacre of the Armenians during the Ottoman Empire in 1915 as "genocide" in a statement released by the White House. Turkey has long practiced a policy of denial against the Armenian Genocide, and Biden's move was refuted by President Erdogan as "groundless" and opening a "deep wound" in U.S.-Turkey relations.

On February 9, 2024, Turkish Foreign Minister Hakan Fidan said that the international community's silence on Israel's actions in Gaza were "complicity in genocide".

Positions
| Issue | USA | Turkey |
|---|---|---|
| Armenia | ✅ (April 24, 2021) | |
| Gaza | | ✅ (February 9, 2024) |
| Uyghurs | ✅ (January 19, 2021) | |

==== Economic Development (Iraq Development Road, Zangezur corridor) ====
Trade Corridors

India-Middle East-Europe Economic Corridor

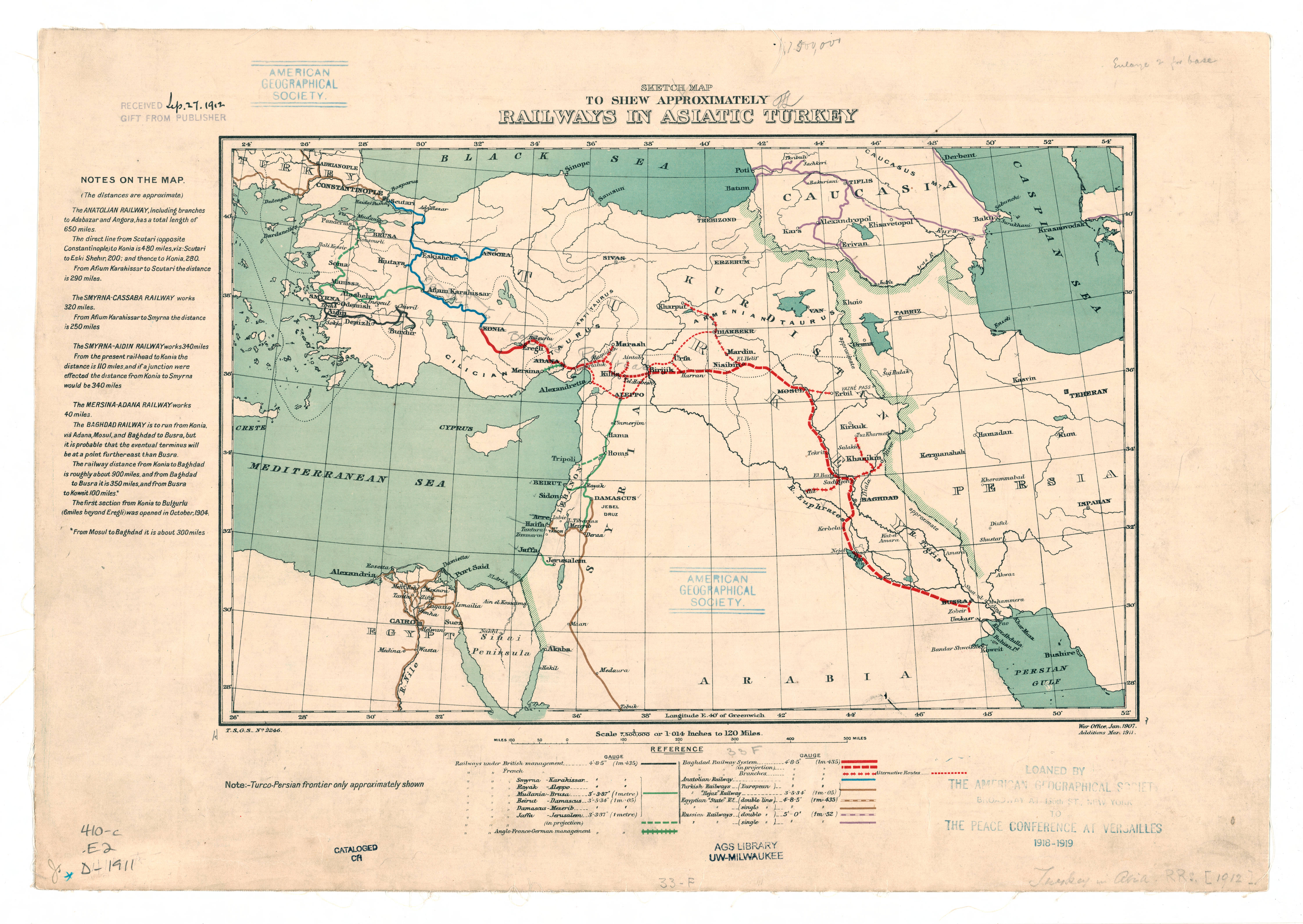
Iraq Development Road

President Joe Biden and his allies announced a plan to build a rail and shipping corridor. The India-Middle East-Europe Economic Corridor is a planned economic corridor that aims to bolster economic development by fostering connectivity between Asia, the Persian Gulf and Europe. The Iraq Development Road is an undergoing project aiming to connect Asia with Europe. In September 2023, IMEEC criticised by Turkey as the existing but underdeveleoped Iraq-Turkey connection already present viable-established but underutilized corridor which could reach its potential with the Iraq Development Road. The project was envisaged to bolster the current connection through the Persian Gulf with Europe through a railway and highway via ports in the United Arab Emirates, Qatar, and Iraq, including the under-construction Grand Faw Port.

Competing corridors
| | Biden economic corridor | Iraq Development Road |
|---|---|---|
| Time table | September 2023 (Momerandum) | April 2024 (Momerandum) |
| States involved | Asia → United Arab Emirates → Saudi Arabia → Israel → Greece → Europe | Asia → Iraq → Turkey → Europe |

The Zangezur corridor has been a flashpoint since the end of the Second Nagorno-Karabakh War. Azerbaijan and Turkey have been promoting this trade route to connect Azerbaijan to Nakhchivan through Armenia's Syunik Province. Armenia steadily objected to this connection. The dispute between Azerbaijan and Armenia extended to terminology, potential routes, and modes of transport. After Armenian forces blocked the Zangezur corridor in 2023, American Enterprise Institute scholar Michael Rubin called on Biden to act, and to start talks with Armenia to establish a military base in the Zangezur corridor. On September 11, 2023, a small contingent of U.S. special forces trained with Armenian soldiers during the "Eagle Partner" exercise in Armenia.

==== Alliances (Enlargement of NATO, BRICS) ====
The enlargement of NATO continued with two new members during President Biden's term, Finland and Sweden. Turkey initially insisted on keeping its veto power over their membership, citing concerns over "combating terrorism" to be extended specifically to include "the PKK, PYD, YPG, and FETÖ" in the tripartite memorandum between Finland, Sweden, and Turkey during the NATO summit in Madrid in June 2022. For well over a year, Turkey used this power to seek concessions from the Western bloc, which did not recognize the PYD, YPG, or FETÖ as "terrorist entities" but recognizes the PKK as such. Finland-Turkey negotiations ended with these issues resolved. Turkey also saw Sweden's difficult domestic membership application issues (e.g., 2023 Quran burnings in Sweden) as a moment of leverage not just for terrorism, but also for obtaining 40 new F-16Vs from the United States, as it blocked the negotiations between the parties. On May 18, 2022, the U.S. brought the issue of listing the PYD and YPG, defined as "allies" by the United States in the war against ISIS, but viewed by Turkey as affiliates of the PKK, and the Gülen movement as "terrorist organizations" to the table for clarification. Regarding the aforementioned US-Turkey discussions, President Erdoğan stated that "neither country has an open, clear stance against [the mentioned] terrorist organizations. We cannot say 'yes' to those who impose sanctions on Turkey [during our fight against our enemy], on joining NATO, which is [essentially] a security organization." On June 29, 2022, U.S. President Joe Biden thanked Turkish President Recep Tayyip Erdoğan for paving the way for Finland and Sweden's membership at the NATO summit in Madrid.

According to Russian media reports (never officially confirmed by Ankara), Turkey requested BRICS membership. If admitted, Turkey would become part of the first significant counterweight (navigating to multipolarity) to the U.S.-led global order.

==== Air Defense (S400, F-35, F-16C) ====
Sanctions were in place during the first Trump administration; as a result, Turkey faced issues in exporting the helicopters to Pakistan. The hold-up had also involved Ankara's overflight disputes with Athens over the Aegean Sea. This dispute was resolved with the approval for the sale of F-35A fighter jets to Greece. In December, when Congress passed the final version of the FY2023 NDAA (P.L.117-263), it excluded a House-passed condition on F-16 sales to Turkey related to potential overflights above Greek islands in the Aegean Sea. Regarding the slowrolling of the issue by the Congress, in January 2024, Chairman of the Senate Foreign Relations Committee, Democrat Ben Cardin, stated that the approval for the sale of 40 new F-16V fighter jets and 79 upgrade kits to Turkey was contingent on Turkey's approval for Sweden's accession to NATO. A letter to the Congress at the same time stated that if unable to upgrade its F-16 fleet, Turkey might consider purchasing Eurofighter Typhoon aircraft. However, Erdoğan seized the moment to give his presidential approval for Sweden's NATO membership on January 25, 2024.

Senator Bob Menendez, who had earlier opposed the sale of F-16Vs to Turkey, said he still held that view despite the Sweden-Turkey deal over the former's NATO membership, brokered by President Biden. On March 21, 2024, Bob Menendez announced that due to federal corruption charges (including bribery, extortion, honest services fraud, obstruction of justice, and conspiracy) he would not run in the Democratic primary. He later resigned from the Senate and was subsequently sentenced to 11 years in prison following his conviction on bribery and corruption charges on January 29, 2025.

On June 6, 2024, the Turkish government signed a letter of acceptance (LOA) to acquire 40 new F-16V aircraft. On November 26, 2024, the Turkish government announced that it intends to move forward with the acquisition of 40 new F-16V aircraft, but has decided to cancel the purchase of upgrade kits to bring 79 of its existing F-16 Block 40 and Block 50 aircraft to the Block 70 "Viper" standard, opting instead to upgrade all of its Block 30, Block 40 and Block 50 aircraft with the domestically produced kits that were developed under the F-16 "Özgür" and "Özgür-2" upgrade programs.

On November 27, 2024, the Turkish government announced that the Turkish Air Force also intends to order 40 new F-35A aircraft, if a deal can be reached with the United States regarding the crisis caused by Turkey's purchase of the S-400 air defense system from Russia. The United States has so far presented two solutions to Turkey: On March 19, 2022, the U.S. proposed Turkey to deliver its Russian-made S-400 missile defence systems to Ukraine, in order to assist it in fighting the invading Russian forces. Two years later, during a visit to Turkey on July 1–2, 2024, Celeste Wallander, the Assistant Secretary of Defense for International Security Affairs, and Michael R. Carpenter, special advisor to the President and Senior Director for Europe at the U.S. National Security Council, proposed stationing the S-400 missile systems at the U.S.-controlled sector of Incirlik Air Base, in exchange for reinstating Turkey in the F-35 fighter jet program. Both of these proposals have so far been rejected by the Turkish government.

=== Second Trump administration (2025–present) ===
==== Iran ====
President Donald Trump said on 14 January 2026 that countries that do business with Iran will face a new 25% tariff. This includes Turkey which imports 16% of Iran's goods to as of 2023.

==== Syria (territorial integrity, return of refugees) ====
At the first phone call between the two leaders, Turkey stressed the importance of lifting restrictions on Syria to start the reconstruction work for the return of refugees of the Syrian civil war.

Syrian YPG (Syrian-Kurdish general commander of the SDF, Mazloum Abdi) expects continued military aid and a defense umbrella from the Trump administration. Secretary of State Marco Rubio, during his Senate confirmation hearing, stated support for the idea of Syrian Kurdish forces. On January 25, 2025, Turkey clarified its position to EU at the joint news conference with visiting EU foreign policy chief Kaja Kallas in Ankara. Foreign Minister Hakan Fidan called for a resolution: Turkey awaits US action.

The fight against terrorism in Syria, including the PKK and ISIS, is now the responsibility of the new administration. We are ready to provide our support. We are also ready to support the new administration in the management of the camps (Al-Hawl refugee camp) in northeastern Syria. In this regard, our rightful expectation from all our partners is to end their relations with the PKK's affiliates [YPG] in Syria.

— Hakan Fidan, Türkiye awaits US to address bilateral issues from the ex-administration,

The 2026 Abu al-Duhur Air Base airstrikes occurred on the day SDF's integration with Damascus was complete.

==== Israel (Truce, Gaza Peace Summit, Abu al-Duhur) ====
Israel and Lech-Lecha

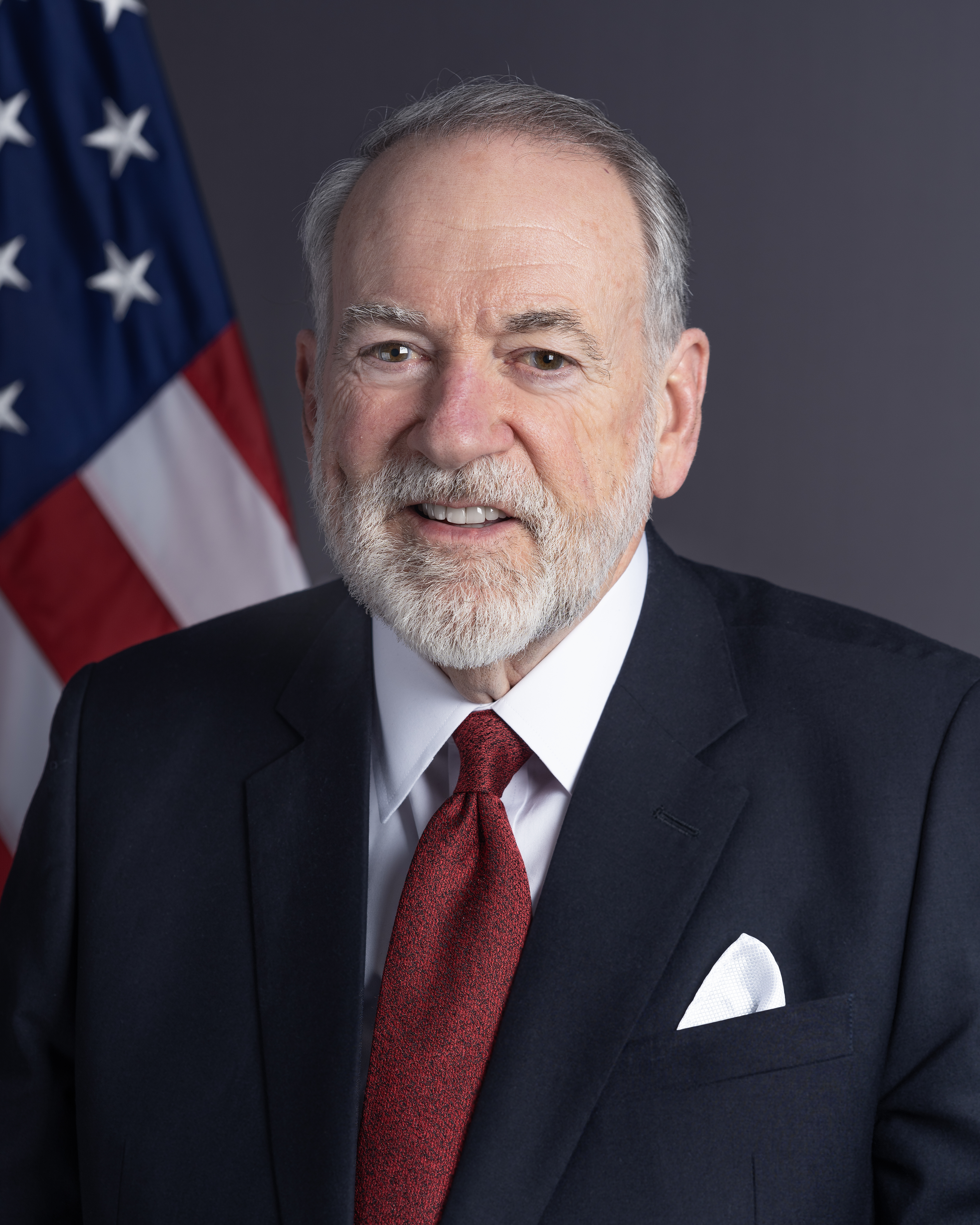
Huckabee: "it would be fine if they took it all." ("river of Egypt to the great river, the Euphrates")

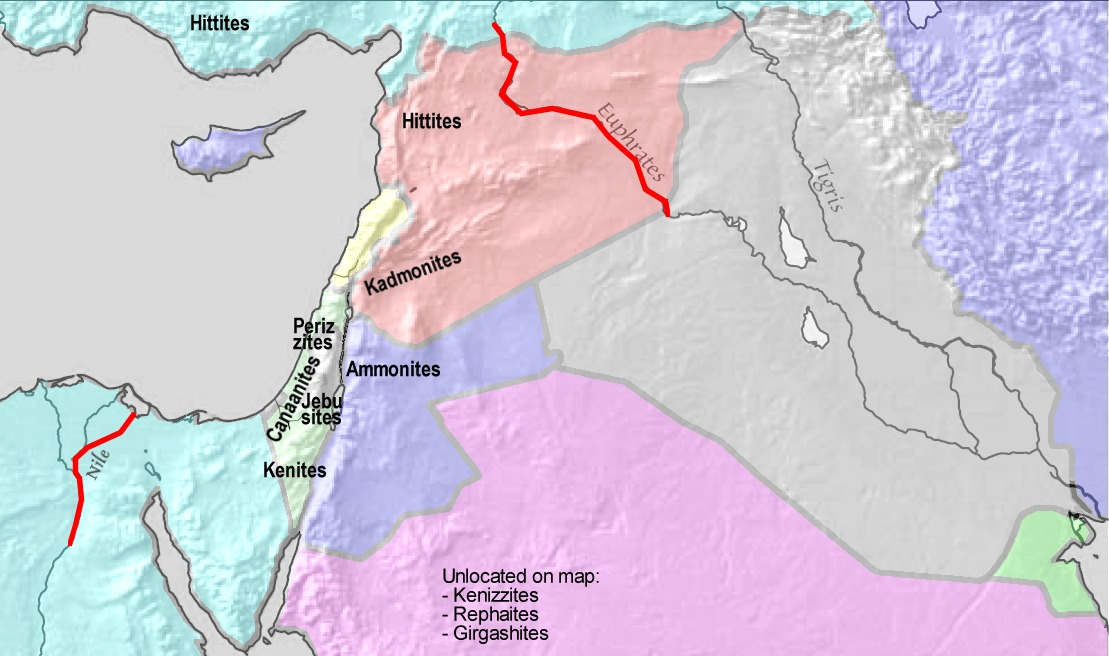
Biblical reference at Genesis 15:7–17:6, Greater Israel.

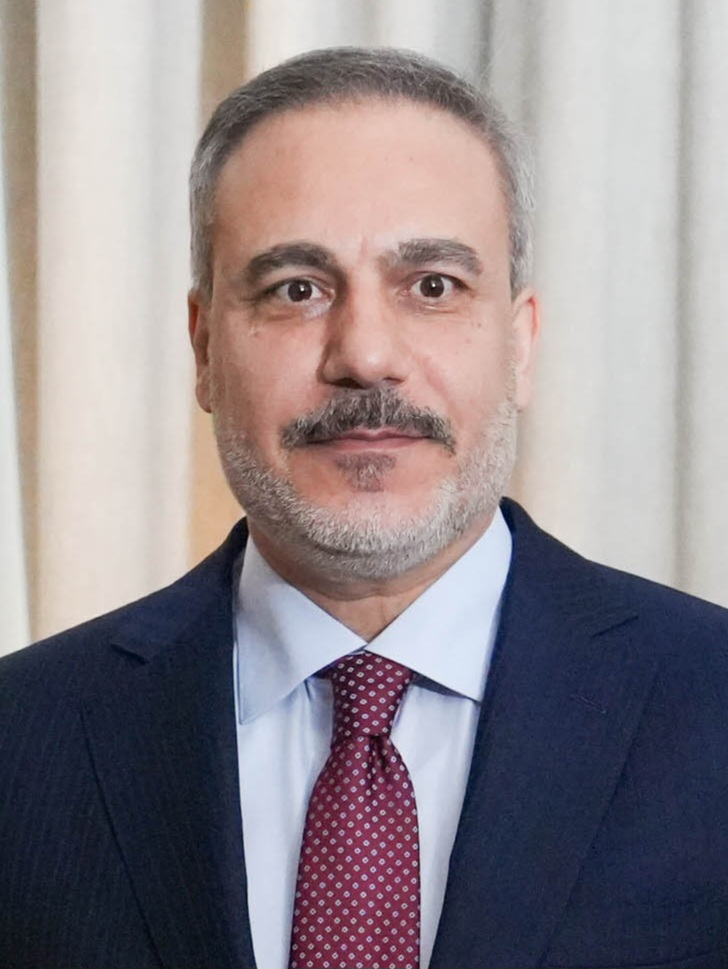
Fidan: "security as a pretext to acquire 'more land'"

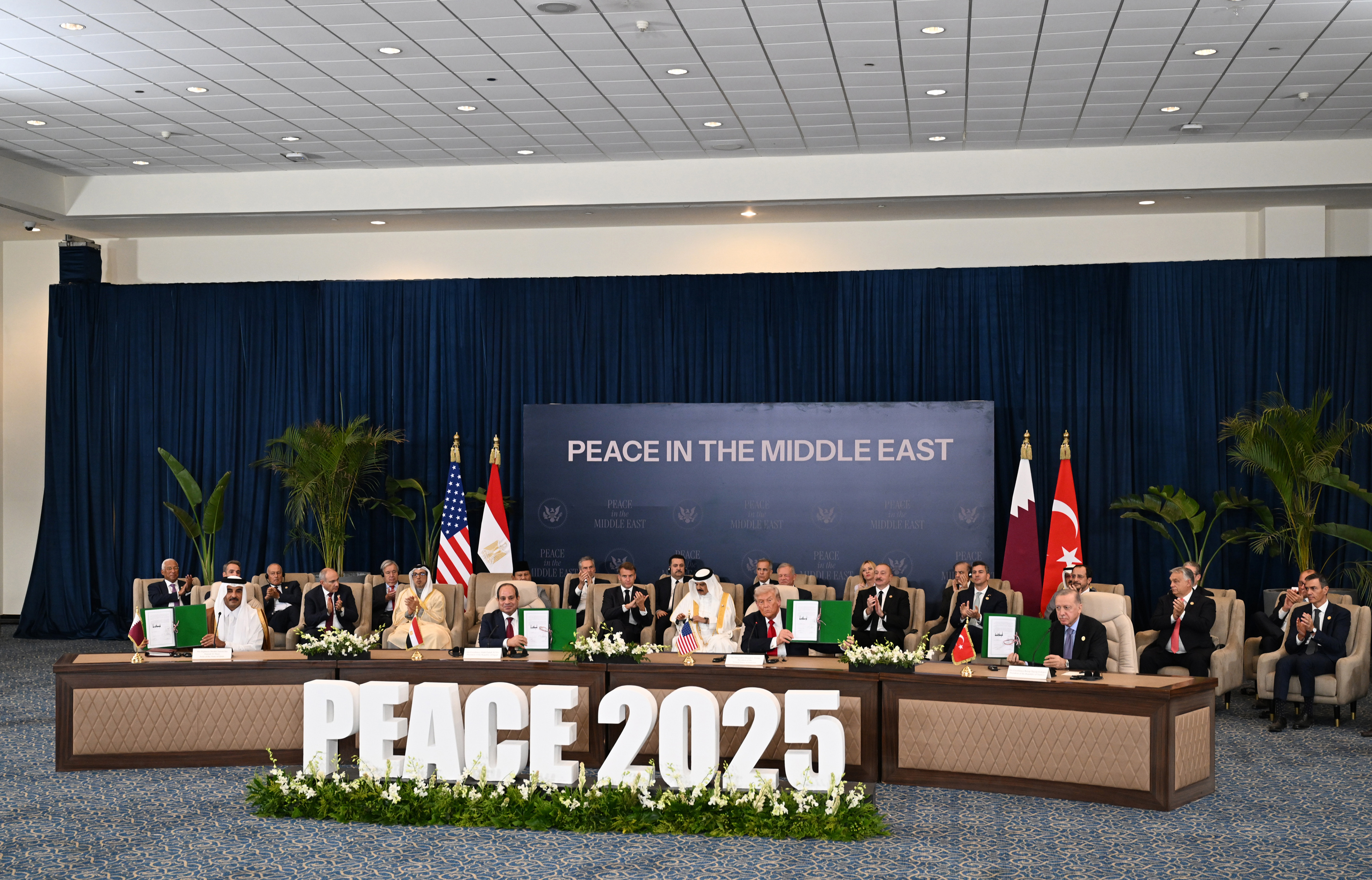
2025 Gaza Peace Summit

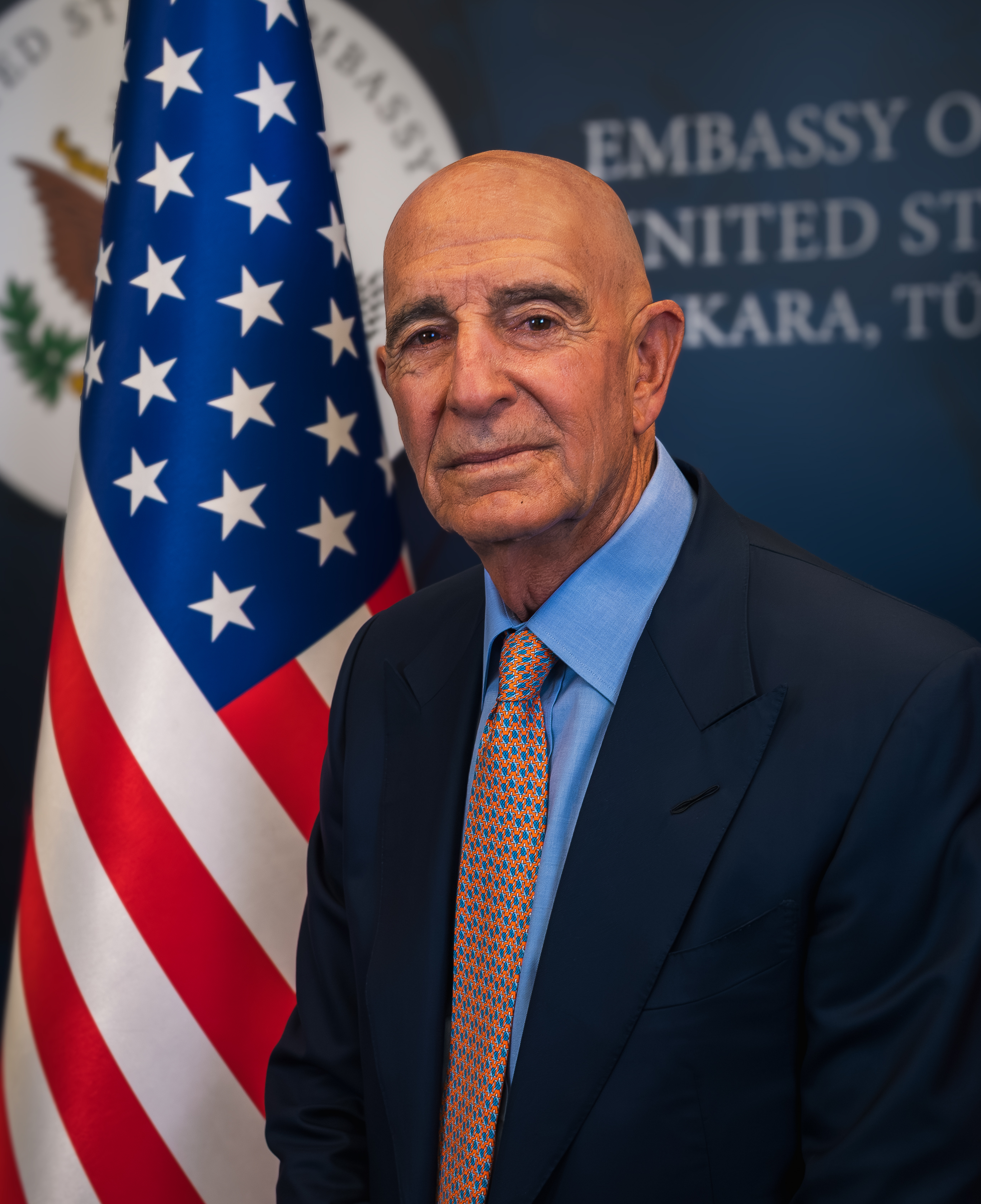
Barrack: Israel's Syria strike risked military confrontation with Turkey

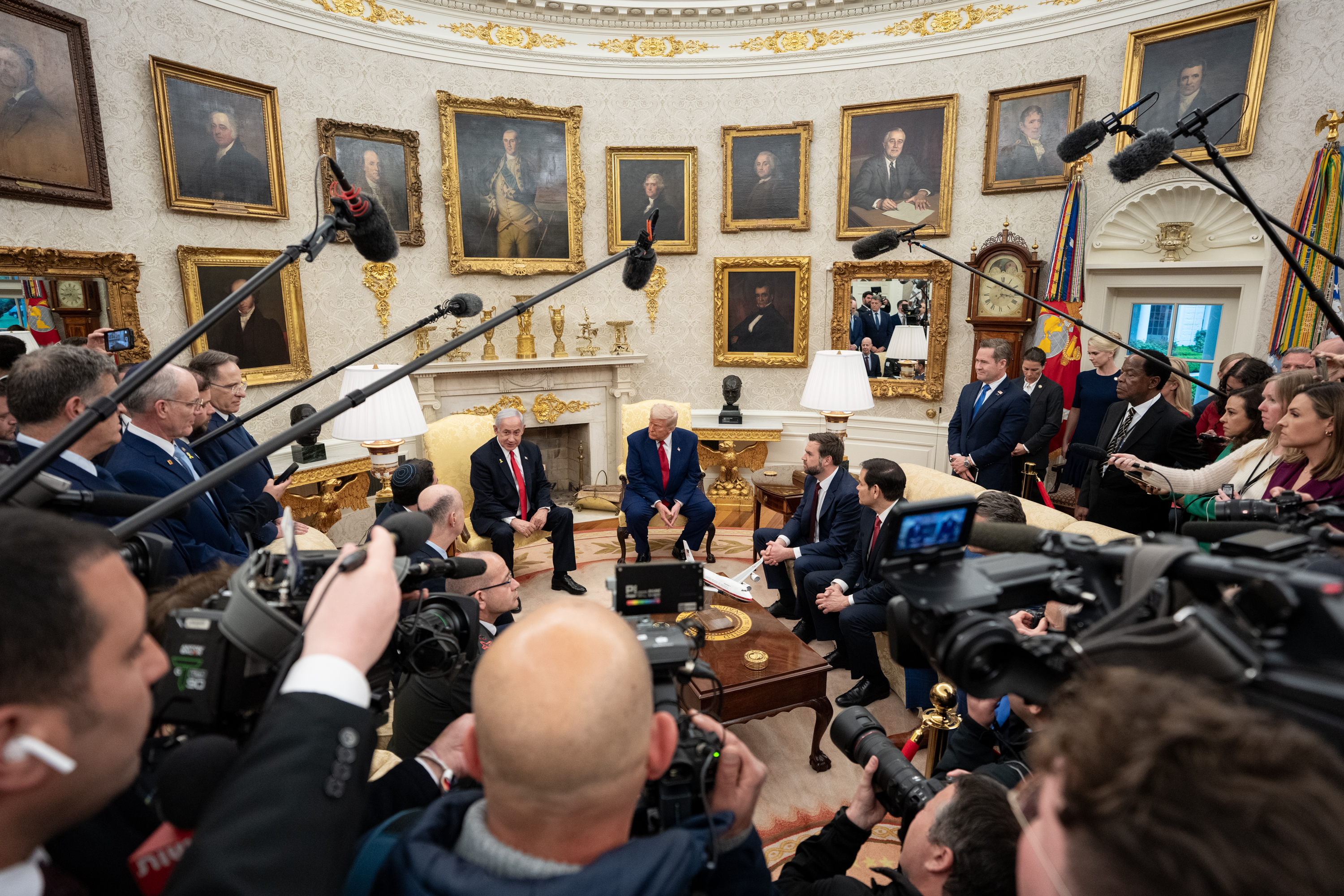
Trump: I can mediate Turkey-Israel over Syria. Netanyahu: "We've had neighborly relations with Turkey that have deteriorated, and we don't want to see Syria being used by anyone, including Turkey, as a base for attack in Israel."

The 2025 Israel–Hamas war ceasefire was signed with President-elect Trump's active involvement, along with Egypt and Qatar. The first phase took effect on January 19, 2025, a day before the second inauguration of Donald Trump. President Erdoğan called on the international community to fulfill its responsibilities toward ending the suffering of innocent civilians. On October 13, 2025, the 2025 Gaza Peace Summit following an agreement to implement the first phase of the Gaza peace plan. Egyptian President Abdel Fattah el-Sisi, Donald Trump, Qatari Emir Sheik Tamim bin Hamad Al Thani, and Erdoğan all signed a joint declaration known as the "Trump Declaration for Enduring Peace and Prosperity." Representatives for Israel and Hamas were absent. It had no binding effect on the State of Israel.

Erdoğan and Netanyahu reached a kinetic level because of Gaza. On November 7, 2025, the Istanbul High Criminal Court initiated proceedings against Netanyahu and 36 other senior Israeli officials over actions in Gaza and maritime intercepts. Formal Indictment presented in April 2026. Concurrently, Netanyahu portrayed Turkey as a major threat. Turkey argued that Benjamin Netanyahu's increasing rhetoric toward Turkey was driven by domestic political pressures and the genocide case against him, rather than strategic realities between the two countries. The finalized indictment included charges over 2025 Global Sumud Flotilla. April 28, 2026, Isaac Herzog took an eight-hour detour to reach Kazakhstan, avoiding Turkish airspace. The warrants froze lukewarm diplomatic ties and heightened long-term regional friction. The post-war security arrangements in Gaza became more complicated. The court issued an Interpol Red Notice request in July 2026. Filed under No. 2026/108, the case involves 35 defendants, including Netanyahu and Afek Moskovitch. August 9, 2026, Netanyahu rejected Trump's 15-point plan for Gaza. Turkey, alongside Egypt, Qatar, Saudi Arabia, the UAE, Jordan, Pakistan, and Indonesia, issued a joint statement holding Israel fully responsible for derailing.

Eight days later, on August 17, 2026, Netanyahu's said Israel had 2026 Abu al-Duhur Air Base airstrikes because Syria had been “on the verge of breaching” an agreed-upon “status quo in security matters” by allowing Turkish troops to deploy there. Turkey said its Syrian assistance was provided at the request of the Syrian government and is intended to reinforce the country's unity, territorial integrity and ability to combat terrorism, and Israel was informed by the U.S. that Turkey's Syrian support covers training, consultancy, technical assistance and reciprocal visits aimed at strengthening Syria’s defense capacity against ISIS. The Foreign Ministry of Turkey condemned the attack. United States Presidential Envoy for Syria Tom Barrack stated that Syria neither “adopted a predatory posture nor maintained proxy forces” but has repeatedly indicated a preference for de-escalation with Israel. White House condemned 'unnecessary escalation'.

20:00 But our belief is there's no intention at all to do any of those things, and this idea of a "Greater Israel", which you know sometimes in Istanbul papers you wake up in the morning, and there's a picture of everything from Egypt to the Maldives with some journalist saying this is Israel's focus. You wake up in Tel Aviv, and there's another picture of Ottoman Empire 2.0, the same territory and the same.

20:44 We [United States] don't, we don't think any of those things are true. But the third thing that probably happened is somebody [Mossad] picked up some intelligence, probably of a phone call, talking about in the future some idea of [clears throat] more uh Turkish help or occupation. And a commander [IDF] somewhere in the field said, "We're going to make sure that doesn't happen. We're going to take out the runways."

— Tom Barrack, Why did Israel bomb the Syrian Abu al-Duhur Air Base?, Barrack, Tom (August 21, 2026). "The truth about the Israeli strike on Turkey in Syria — w/ U.S. Special Envoy Tom Barrack" (video). youtube.com. Mario Nawfal.

U.S. Special Envoy Tom Barrack gave an interview on how U.S. deconflicting Israel and Turkey. Amb Tom Barak clarified that The U.S. government does not believe the Istanbul papers quoting "Blueprint for the Middle East" and parallels on Israel's current national security policies. However, Hakan Fidan said at the Antalya Diplomacy Forum: "Israel has created an illusion internationally, claiming that Israel is in favor of its own security, but it has become very clear, especially in the recent years ... it is more than that, ... from the Palestinian lands, Gaza, the West Bank, East Jerusalem, and now Lebanon and Syria, it was an ongoing occupation and expansionism in the region."

==== Palestine (Öztürk) ====
In 2025, while the U.S. government did not release an exact country-by-country breakdown of statistics, during democratic backsliding in the United States via visa and deportation controversies in the second Trump administration, part of deportation in the second Trump administration, the only publicized Turkish student involved in the controversies was detention of Rümeysa Öztürk. Elected officials and others condemned Öztürk's treatment as targeting students for their political views without due process. Rümeysa Öztürk published her article on March 26, 2024. She was detained on March 25, 2025. SecStat Rubio and FM Fidan met on March 25, 2025. Turkey emphasized the importance of stability in Syria and the Balkans, while discussing efforts to end the Russia-Ukraine war and the need for a ceasefire in Gaza.

On March 25, 2025, in the Rubio-Fidan meeting. Turkey asked the U.S. to use its influence on Israel to address the need for increased efforts for a permanent ceasefire in the Gaza Strip, as adequate humanitarian aid is needed in the region, which is in dire condition. Humanitarian aid during the Gaza war became part of Gaza genocide. Despite historically differing rhetoric between the two states on Palestinians and Hamas, the Trump administration and Turkey found substantial alignment on a diplomatic resolution, which cultivated the 2025 Gaza Peace Summit. Turkey officially transitioned into a central guarantor nation for the Gaza peace process. The U.S. actively tapped Turkey to help convince Hamas to adhere to the plan. U.S. envisioned a major role for Ankara in Gaza's reconstruction and the proposed International Stabilization Force. This cooperation served a mutual strategic interest: Washington wanted capable regional allies to absorb the security burden. Turkish Defense Ministry stated that the country's armed forces were experienced in peacekeeping operations and ready to take on any assigned mission, as long as Israel pulled back to pre-conflict borders [last stage of the process]. During the negotiations, Turkey managed to reach Hamas groups thought to be holding hostages, which had previously been unreachable due to internal communication breakdowns. Turkey, besides the release, was also involved in locating the remains of Israeli hostages believed to have died in Hamas custody. Resolving Israeli reservations about Turkey's military presence in Gaza was the U.S.'s responsibility. The U.S. took Israel's position.

Palestine

March 25, 2025: Detention of Rümeysa Öztürk

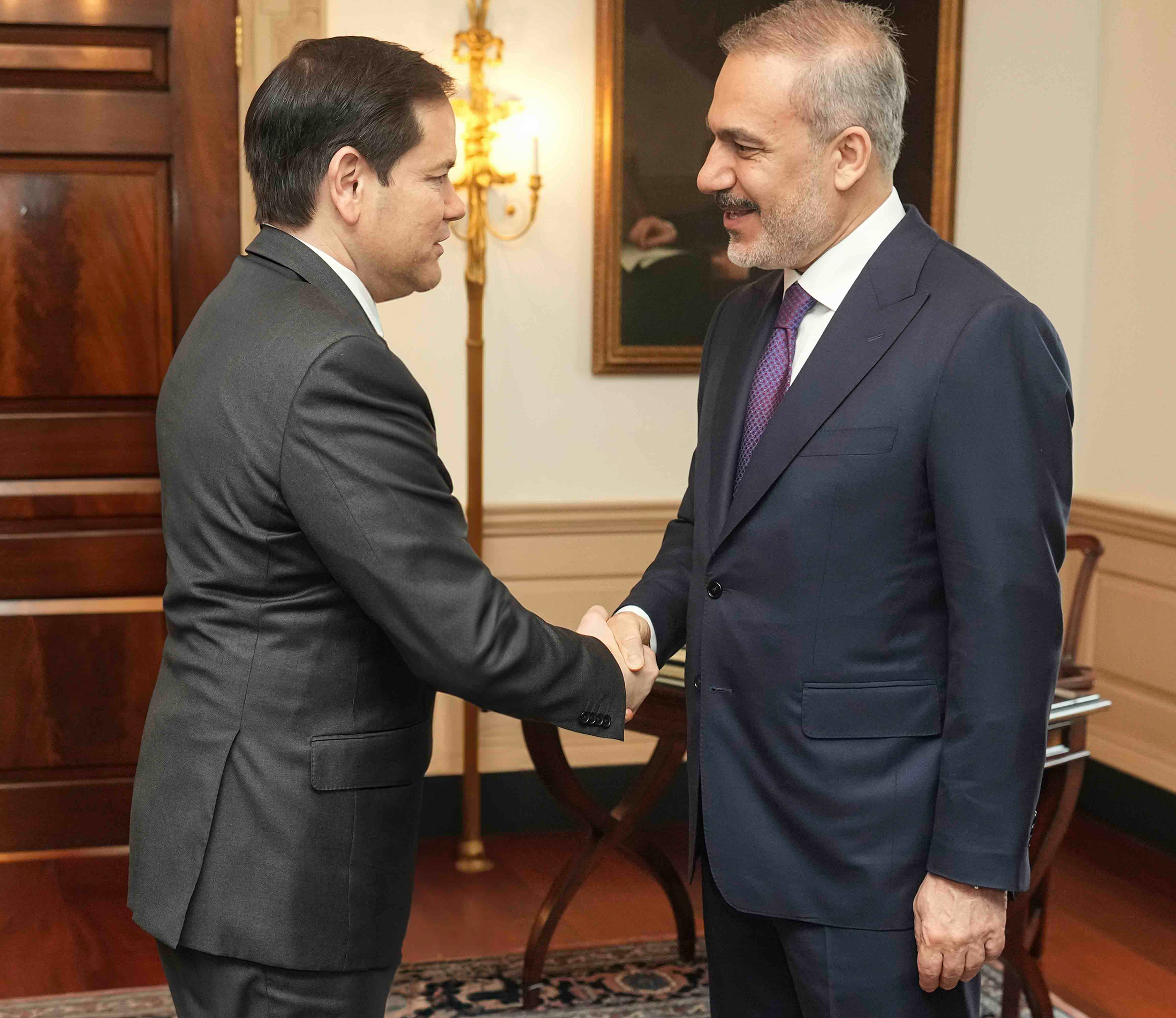
March 25, 2025: Rubio & Fidan at the Department of State

==== Russo-Ukrainian War (Truce, Straits) ====
President Erdoğan has expressed his willingness to collaborate with President Trump in achieving a truce that will end the Russia-Ukraine war. At a security meeting with Ukraine and 21 other nations, Turkey reiterated the importance of Russia and Ukraine signing a peace agreement. Turkey declared it would continue to implement the Montreux Convention to block the passage of military vessels into the Black Sea, as it has done since the Russian occupation of Ukraine started in February 2022.

On October 22, 2025, the United States imposed sanctions against Russia's largest oil companies Rosneft and Lukoil. The U.S. also threatened secondary sanctions against foreign financial institutions and companies that continue to do business with Rosneft and Lukoil, which would affect their customers in Turkey.

==== Alliances (Mecca, NATO) ====
In March 2026, during 2026 Iran war the NATO air defense systems successfully intercepted a ballistic missile fired from Iran to Turkey. NATO did not invoke Article 5 but declared it was ready, even though the NATO interception was proof of acceptance of belligerency.

In August 2026, Israel claimed Turkey's NATO protection (Article 5) does not apply to Turkish troops in Syria, if there is a hot confrontation between Turkey and Israel. Israel Katz warned Turkey not to test Israel's resolve, accusing Turkey of dragging itself into dangerous adventures in Syria by developing a functioning Syrian state [with security forces]. Would NATO Allies consider whether they have an obligation to protect Turkey if Turkey covered attacks are “deemed to include” the attack to itself. Russia tested the waters by killing Turkish soldiers, in February 2020, when Russian aircraft carried out or directed to kill 33 Turkish soldiers in Syria’s Idlib province. When a country feels that its territorial integrity, political independence, or security is threatened, Article 4 serves as a step toward Article 5. Turkey invoked Article 4. NATO condemned the strikes; no member invoked Article 5. Turkey developed the response alone through Operation Spring Shield; Russia did not declare war on Turkey. It is an unknown territory for the rest of NATO [non-US members] when Turkey was vanquished under a U.S.–Israel alliance while the rest of NATO watched. Erdogan to Netanyahu: Turkey won’t stay silent as Israel [again] plunges region into bloodbath.

Friction, including defense spending and disputes over conflicts such as the war in Iran [the closure of the Strait of Hormuz prompted extensive diplomatic and defense discussions at NATO], has severely tested unity.

Turkey's 21st-century foreign policy shifted from reliance on Cold War-era global bloc pacts to flexible regional pacts. Ankara has adopted a doctrine of "strategic autonomy" and "multi-alignment." Seeking toward a coherent regional strategy, as the American foreign policy aligned increasingly with Isreal rather than reginal security needs. Mowing the grass strained every dimension of relations. Israel forcing a regional reordering: actions involving Syria and escalating rhetoric with Turkey have placed Israel at odds with broader regional and international consensus.

In August, the Mecca Defence Alliance was a defense pact between Pakistan, Saudi Arabia, and Turkey. The pact's ratification was officially announced amidst the 2026 Iran war. US praised the agreement, calling it a "Big, bold, and important first step" and stating he was "very happy" to see the pact signed as a sign of regional self-reliance.

==== Air Defense (CAATSA) ====
On January 25, 2025, Foreign Minister Hakan Fidan said Turkey wanted all sanctions removed, but specifically those under the Countering America's Adversaries Through Sanctions Act.

Netanyahu lobbied the US against selling F-35s to Turkey. Netanyahu aims to keep a military advantage over Turkey's air force as tensions in Syria rise.

== Military relations ==
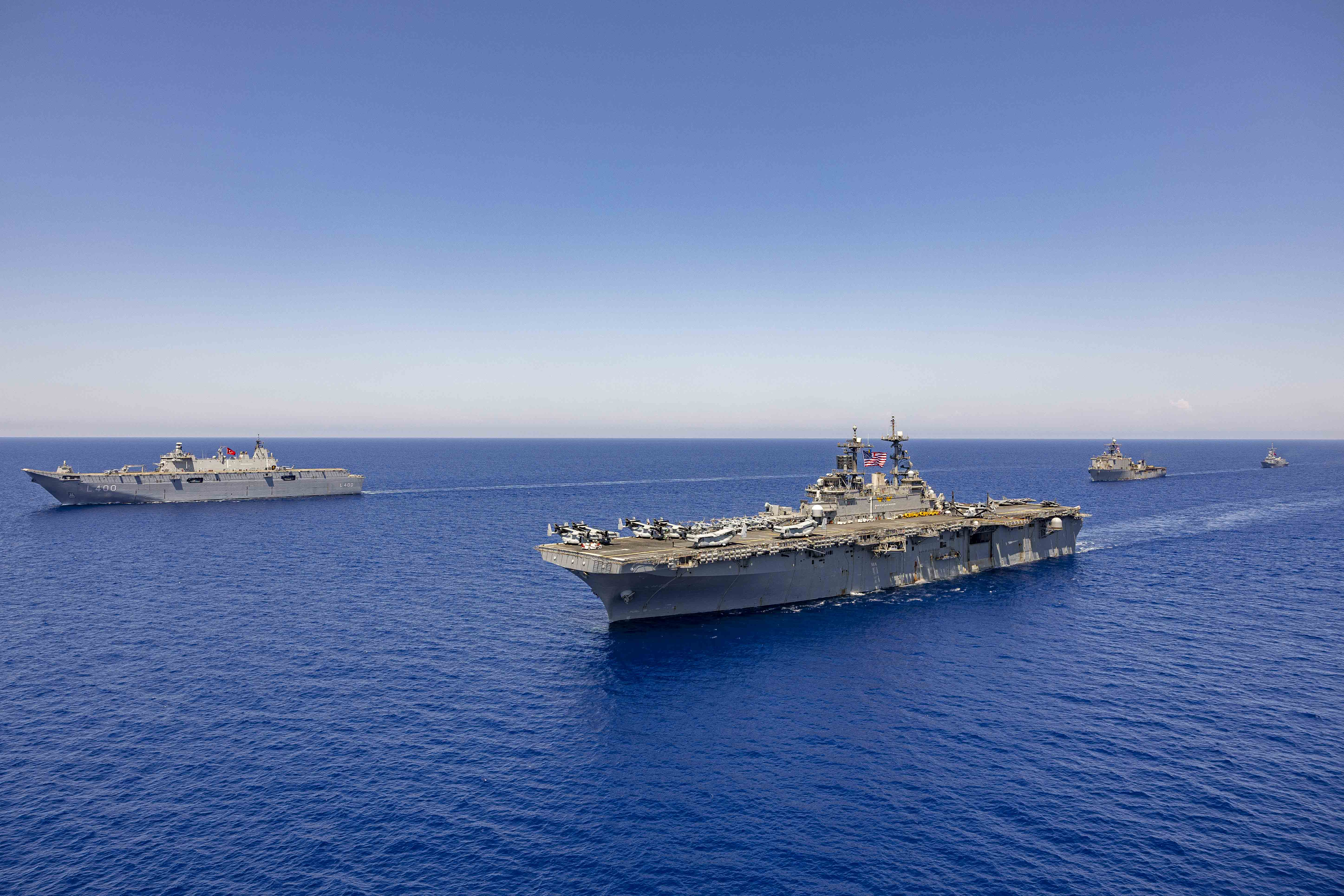
TCG Anadolu and USS Wasp during a Turkish-American naval exercise in the Mediterranean, August 14, 2024.

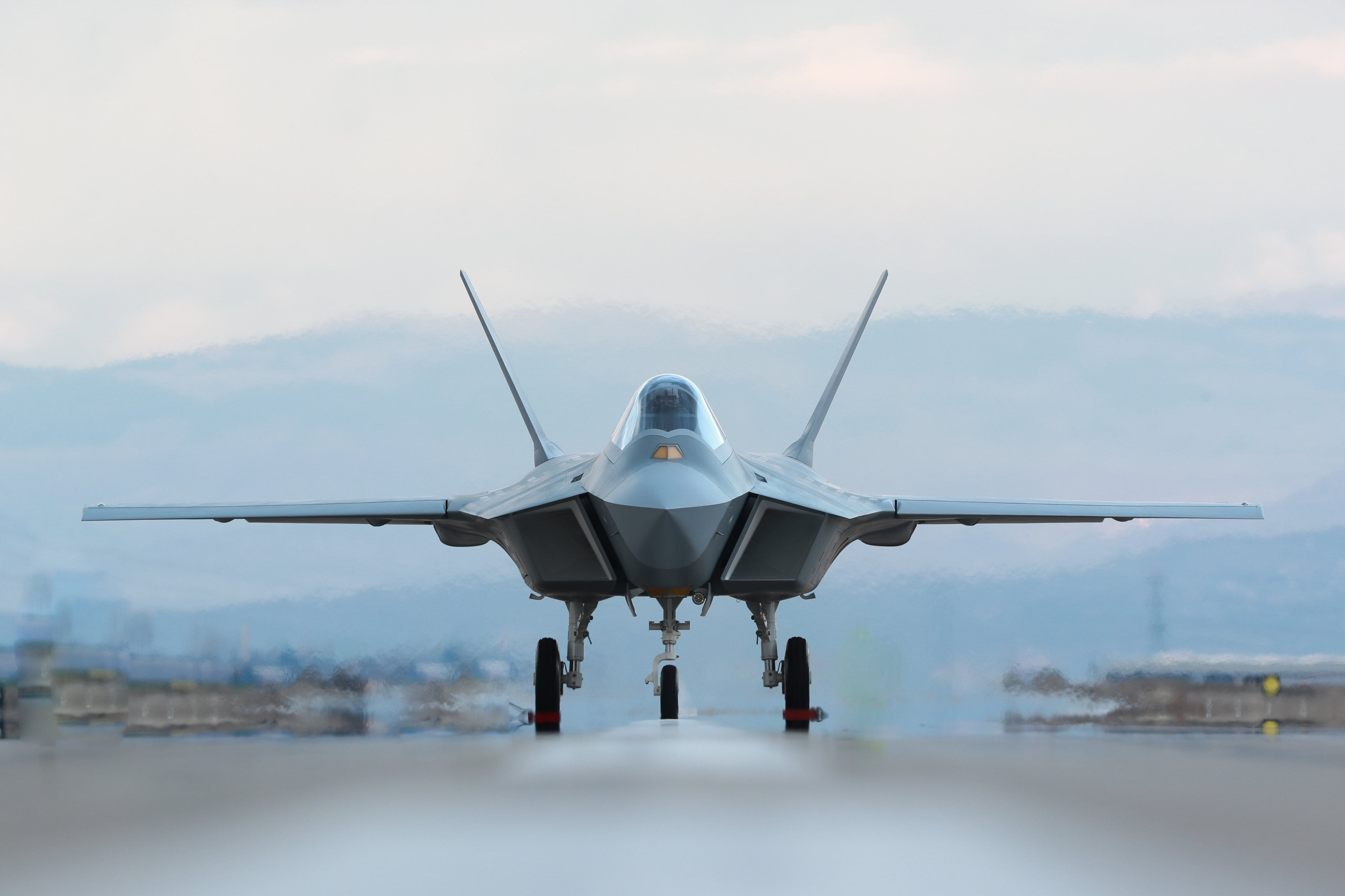
The TAI TF Kaan, a twin-engine fifth-generation air superiority fighter, completed its maiden flight on February 21, 2024.

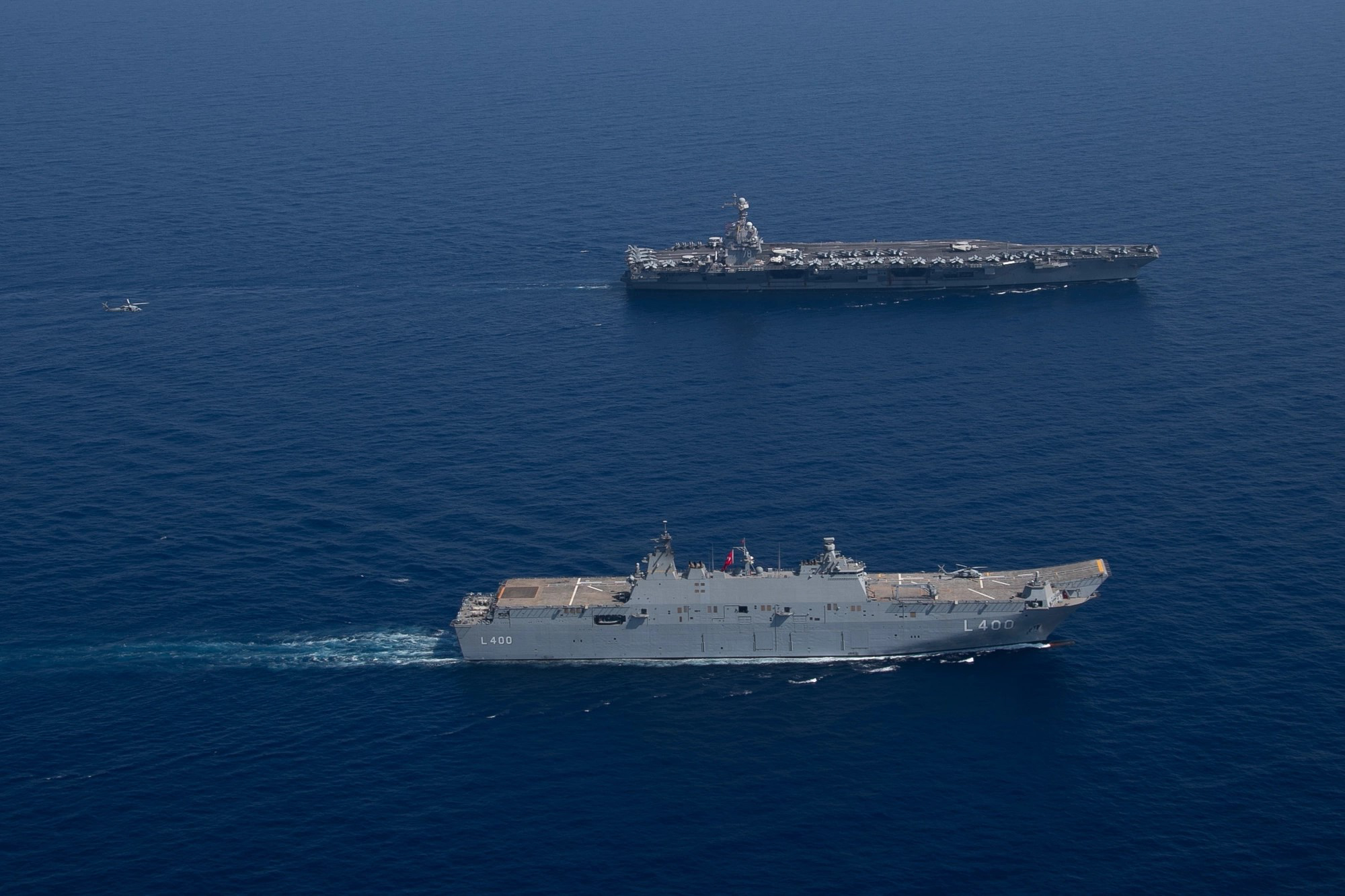
TCG Anadolu and USS Gerald R. Ford during a Turkish-American naval exercise in the Mediterranean Sea, August 21, 2023.

=== Military Industrial Procurement ===
Since Johnson letter, the defense industry of Turkey is growing.

1975–1978 the arms embargo established following the Cyprus invasion forced Turkey to develop a defense industry based on national resources.

In 2019, the 1st Trump administration the arms embargo. Other NATO members followed with separate export and defense-industry restrictions. Since the 1st Trump embargo neither the Biden-Turkey, nor the 2nd Trump-Turkey, did reverse that decision. Such as TEI-TF35000 for TAI TF Kaan, TEI TS1400 for T129 ATAK or SİPER to counter Patriots. Due to the sanctions, the ratio of U.S. origin aircraft constantly decreased among the list of Turkish Air Force aircraft, as did the equipment among the list of equipment of the Turkish Land Forces.

F-16D / F35 Production in Turkey
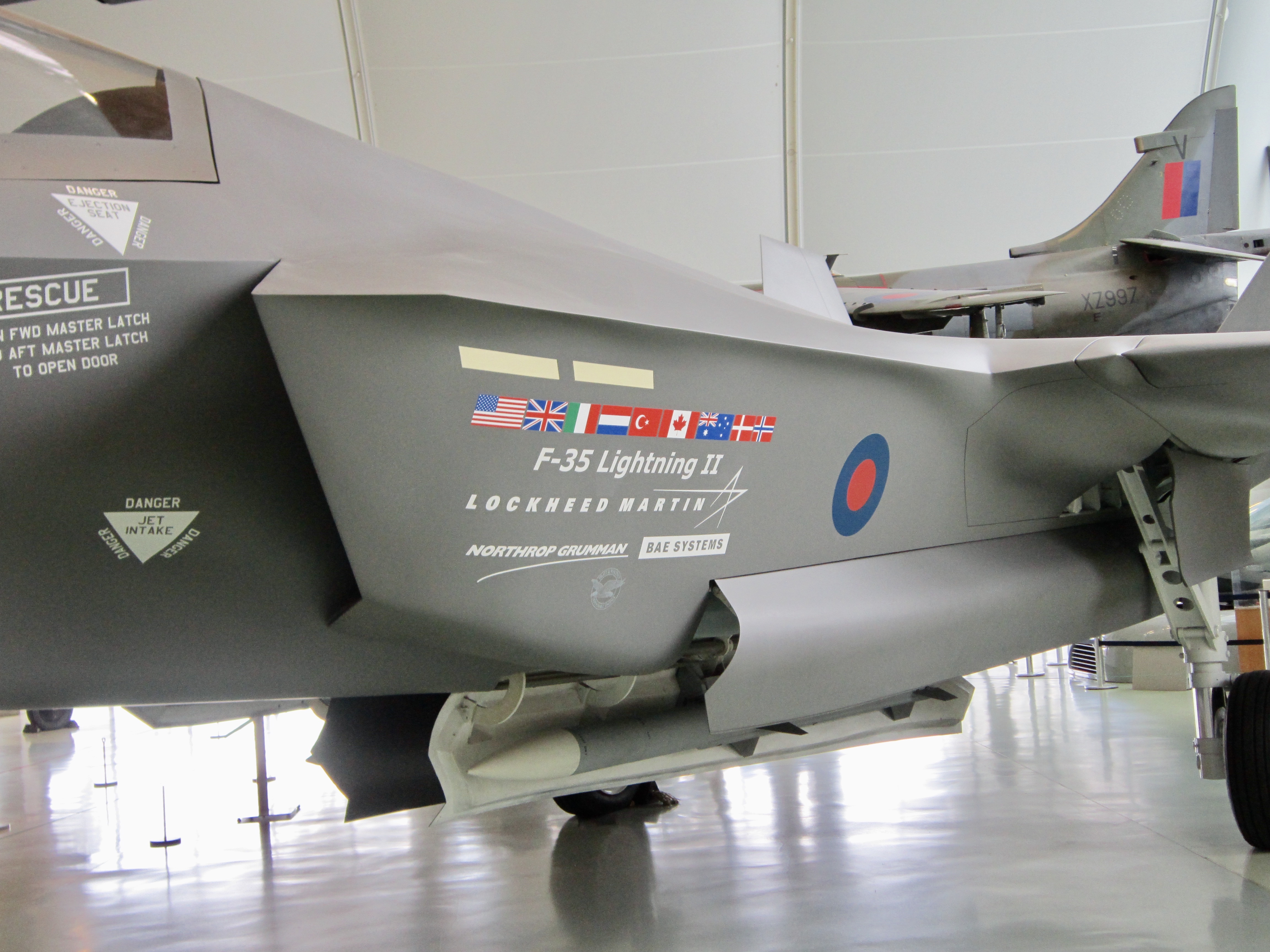

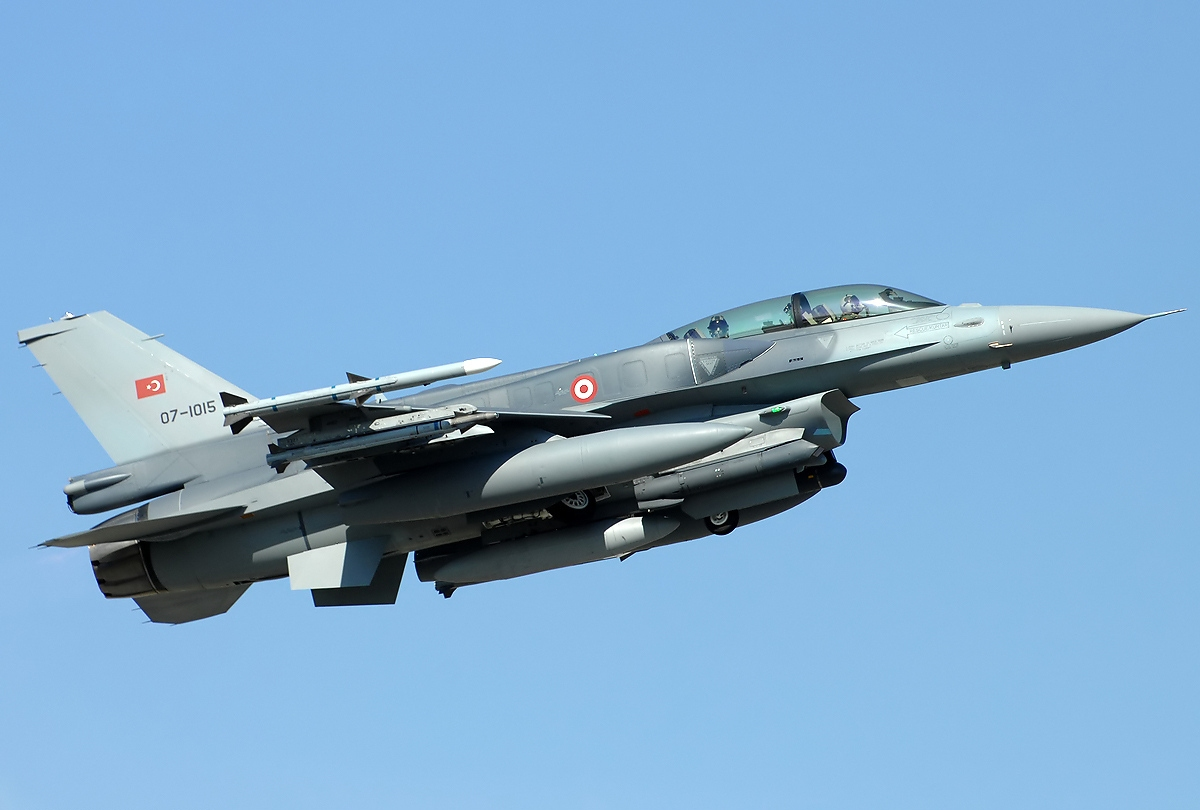
Turkish Air Force F-16D

==== F-16 Sale & Production ====
Turkey's 240 Lockheed Martin General Dynamics F-16 Fighting Falcons were co-produced in Turkey by one of Turkish Aerospace Industries' predecessors (TAI). The United States and Turkey signed an FMS contract in 2009 for 30 F-16 Block 50s to be co-produced by TAI.

Alleged cable leaks highlighted Turkish concerns that upgrades to General Dynamics F-16 Fighting Falcons had "precluded Turkish access to computer systems and software modification previously allowed".

==== F-35 Sale & Production ====
Turkey was a Level 3 partner in the F-35 Joint Strike Fighter program until 2019, when it was removed following its purchase of the S-400 missile system from Russia, despite the CAATSA law of 2017. The Turkish Air Force and Navy were to acquire the F-35A and F-35B variants.

Turkey paid $1.4 billion for procuring F-35A aircraft, with six being delivered to Luke Air Force Base in Arizona, where Turkish pilots received training until the country's removal from the F-35 program in 2019. The six F-35A aircraft built for Turkey were formally added to the inventory of the Turkish Air Force with code numbers 18–0001 to 18–0006, but they were never allowed to leave the United States and are still kept inside hangars, for which the U.S. government demands rent payment from Turkey.

Turkey, a NATO member, was one of eight countries—along with the United Kingdom, Canada, the Netherlands, Italy, Denmark, Norway, and Australia—partnering with the United States in the F-35 Joint Strike Fighter program. Turkey planned to purchase up to 116 F-35s (100 F-35As for the Turkish Air Force and 16 F-35Bs for the Turkish Navy), with 90 to be delivered over an estimated 10-year period (2014–2023) and to be jointly assembled and/or developed by firms from the various JSF partners. The cost was estimated at least $11 billion and reportedly could have exceeded $15 billion, given continued cost inflation that kept raising the aircraft's unit price.

==== Surveillance (Drone) ====
Turkey reportedly wanted to purchase drone aircraft from the United States to assist in its counterterrorism efforts against the PKK before its request was denied. Turkey produced Bayraktar Tactical UAS.

=== Military Operations ===
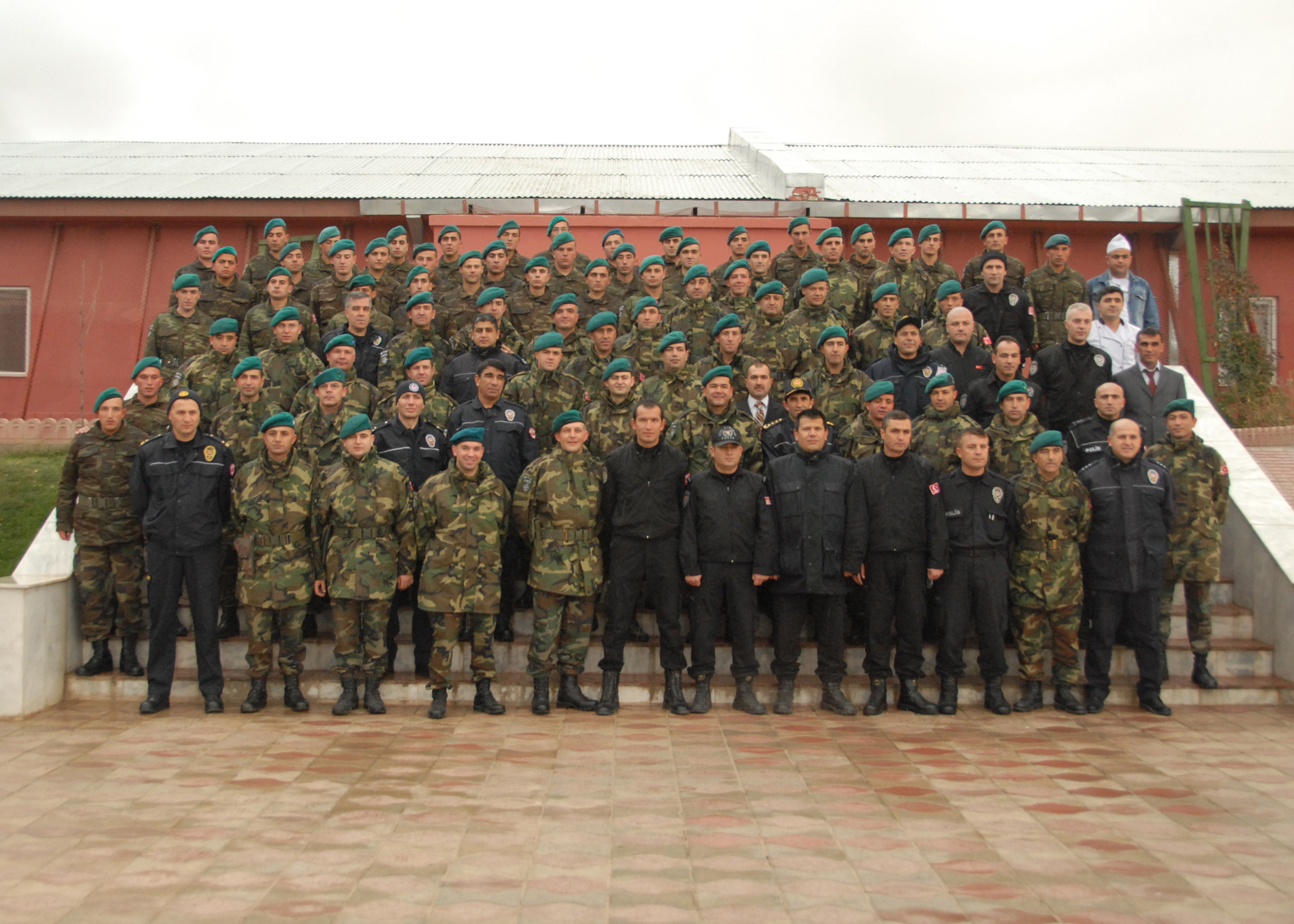
The Turkish Provincial Reconstruction Team (PRT) in the Wardak Province of Afghanistan is part of the U.S. led–International Security Assistance Force (ISAF).

Turkey participated with the United States in the Korean War in 1950–53 and in missions in Somalia, Kosovo, and Bosnia and Herzegovina in 1992–2004.

Turkey has commanded the International Security Assistance Force (ISAF) in Afghanistan twice since its inception. 2,000 Mehmetçik concentrated on training Afghan military and security forces and provided security at ISAF's Regional Command-Capital stationed in Kabul. An undisclosed number of Mehmetçik were deployed to the Wardak and Jawzjan provinces to give ground support to USA Air Force Operations.

During the Iraq War, Turkey established the NATO Training Mission in 2005 and sponsored specialized training for hundreds of Iraqi security personnel in a secret facility in Turkey.

==== Joint Exercises ====
For the Anatolian Falcon 2012 joint exercises, the United States sent the 480th Fighter Squadron to train with Turkish pilots in the operation Suppression of Enemy Air Defenses.

==== Operation Gladio ====
Operation Gladio is the codename for a clandestine "stay-behind" operation of armed resistance that was planned by the Western Union (WU) (and subsequently by NATO) for a potential Warsaw Pact invasion and conquest in Europe.

Counter-Guerrilla is the branch of the operation. The operation's founding goal was to erect a guerrilla force capable of countering a possible Soviet invasion. The goal was soon expanded to subverting communism in Turkey. Counter-Guerrilla initially operated out of the Turkish Armed Forces' Tactical Mobilization Group (STK). In 1967, it was renamed to the Special Warfare Department before becoming Special Forces Command. Counter-Guerrilla's existence in Turkey was revealed in 1973 by then-prime minister Bülent Ecevit.

=== Military Cooperation ===
The United States and Turkey share membership in NATO, the Organization for Security and Co-operation in Europe (OSCE), and continue to cooperate in important projects, such as the Joint Strike Fighter program.

==== Bases and logistics ====
USA facilities [base, port, command] (old [red] & current [black])

Since 1954, Turkey has hosted the Incirlik Air Base, an important operations base of the United States Air Force, which has played a critical role during the Cold War, the Gulf War, and the Iraq War. Turkey routinely hosts the United States for Anatolian Falcon and (with Israel, before their relationship worsened) Anatolian Eagle exercises held at its Konya airbase.

Turkish bases and transport corridors have been used heavily for military operations in Iraq, Afghanistan, and Libya as of 2011.

In the 2016 Turkish coup d'état attempt, some of the planes used at the operation and a fueling carrier took off from Incirlik base; in response, the Turkish government arrested several high-ranking Turkish military officers at Incirlik and cut power to the base for nearly a week.

==== Nuclear warheads ====
Turkey hosts U.S. controlled nuclear weapons as part of nuclear sharing policy. Its current arsenal is B61 nuclear bomb, while it formerly held MGR-1 Honest John, MIM-14 Nike Hercules, PGM-19 Jupiter, W33 and W48 artillery shells.

Turkey does not have dedicated nuclear-capable fighter aircraft that can deliver the weapons and does not train its pilots to fly nuclear missions.

==== Radar and signal analysis ====
To have the Terminal High Altitude Area Defense be approved, Turkey received two conditions: Iran or Syria should not be named as a threat to Turkey, and Turkey's territory was to be protected by the system (as a national defense requirement). According to U.S. officials, the AN/TPY-2 radar was deployed at Turkey's Kürecik Air Force base and activated in January 2012.

=== Military Aid ===
Table 1. U.S. Military and Security Assistance to Turkey (historical $ in millions) Source: U.S. Agency for International Development, U.S. State Department.
| Fiscal Year(s) | Foreign Mil. Fin. | Excess Defense Articles | Int’l Mil. Ed. and Training | NADR | INCLE | Other Grants | Total Grants | Loans |
| 1948–1975 | — | 869.0 | 111.8 | — | — | 3,406.0 | 4,386.8 | 185.0 |
| 1976–1981 | — | — | 3.4 | — | 1.0 | 10.5 | 14.9 | 952.9 |
| 1982–1992 | 1,884.0 | — | 36.4 | — | 6.7 | 1,362.1 | 3,289.2 | 2,769.1 |
| 1993–2001 | — | 205.1 | 14.0 | 0.1 | 3.2 | — | 222.4 | 1,678.1 |
| 2002–2008 | 170.0 | 21.1 | 23.7 | 8.6 | 0.1 | — | 223.5 | — |
| 2009 | 1.0 | — | 3.2 | 1.9 | 0.5 | — | 6.6 | — |
| 2010 | — | — | 5.0 | 3.0 | — | — | 8.0 | — |
| 2011 | — | — | 4.0 | 1.4 | 0.5 | — | 5.9 | — |
| 2012 | — | — | 4.0 | — | 0.5 | — | 4.5 | — |
| TOTAL | 2,055.0 | 1,095.2 | 205.5 | 14.0 | 12.5 | 4,778.6 | 8,160.8 | 5,585.1 |

=== Military Milestones ===
- 1932: General Douglas MacArthur, then-Chief of Staff of the U.S. Army, visited Turkey and met with Atatürk.
- 1943: The Second Cairo Conference of December 4–6, 1943 addressed Turkey's possible contribution to the Allies in World War II. The meeting was attended by President Franklin D. Roosevelt of the United States, Prime Minister Winston Churchill of the United Kingdom, and President İsmet İnönü of the Republic of Turkey.
- 1950: The Turkish Brigade, codenamed North Star, was a military formation from Turkey that served under the United Nations Command during the Korean War. The brigade's first 5,000 Turkish troops arrived on October 19, 1950, and remained in varying strengths until the summer of 1954. It was attached to the 25th Infantry Division of the United States.
- 1952: Turkey joined NATO on February 18, 1952.
- 1954: The United States and Turkey signed the first status of forces agreement.
- 1980: U.S.–Turkey Defense and Economic Cooperation Agreement.
- 1987: Turkish Aerospace Industries began producing F-16C and F-16D fighter aircraft under license.
- 1992: TCG Muavenet was hit by two Sea Sparrow missiles fired from the aircraft carrier USS Saratoga during NATO's "Exercise Display Determination 1992" in Saros Bay, Turkey, on October 2, 1992, resulting in five deaths and 22 injuries among its crew.
- 1995: The Turkish Air Force took part in NATO's Operation Deliberate Force.
- 1999: The Turkish Air Force took part in NATO's Operation Allied Force.
- 2003: The Turkish Parliament denies permission for the ground invasion of Iraq from Turkey, but permits the use of Turkish air bases for overflight.
- 2003: U.S. forces detained Turkish special forces troops in Suleimaniyah, Iraq.
- 2011: The Turkish Air Force and Turkish Naval Forces took part in NATO's Operation Unified Protector.

== Economic relations ==
U.S. trade deficit (in billions, goods only) by country in 2014

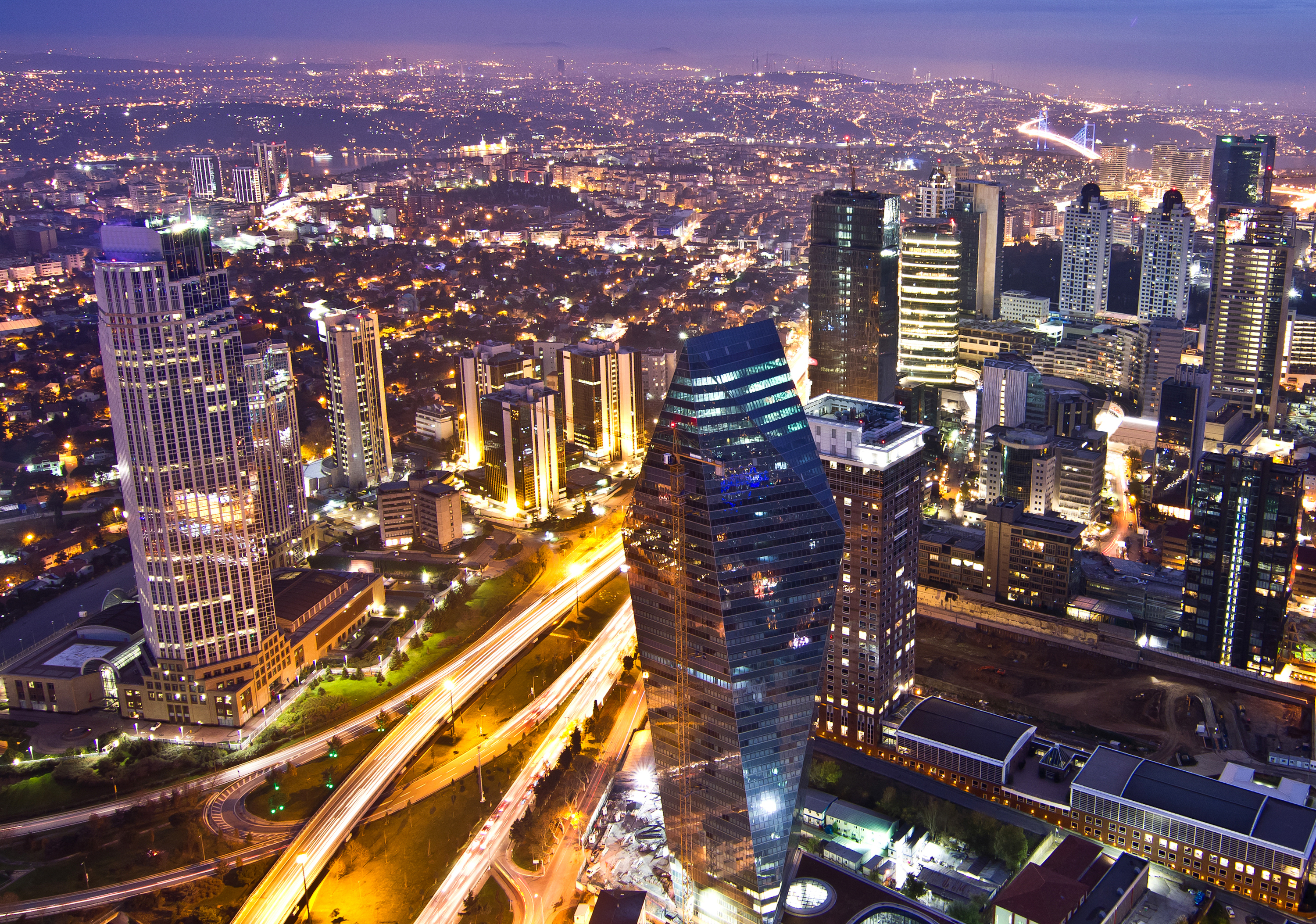
Istanbul is the largest city in Europe (Note: Istanbul straddles both Europe and Asia, with its commercial and historical centre and two-thirds of the population in Europe, the rest in Asia. Istanbul total (2023) = 15,655,924 European side (25 districts) = 10,030,990 Anatolian side (14 districts) = 5,624,934) and the chief financial and economical center of Turkey. Istanbul (Constantinople) was the capital of the Roman (330–395), Byzantine (395–1204 and 1261–1453), Latin (1204–1261) and Ottoman (1453–1922) Empires.

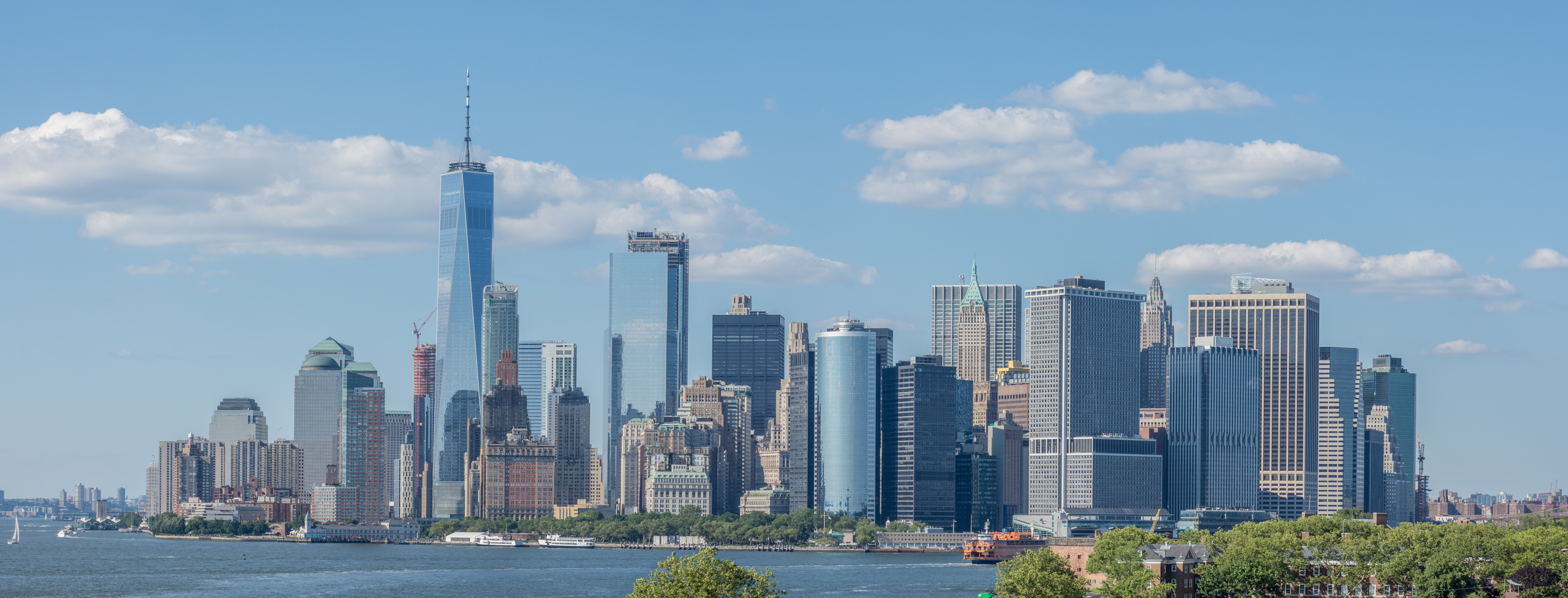
New York is the largest city in the United States and the world's principal financial center.

The United States and Turkey are both members in the Organisation for Economic Co-operation and Development (OECD) and the G-20. The US and Turkey have had a Joint Economic Commission and a Trade and Investment Framework Agreement for several years. In 2002, the two countries indicated their joint intent to upgrade bilateral economic relations by launching an Economic Partnership Commission.

Turkey is currently the 32nd-largest goods trading partner with $20.5 billion in total ($10.2 billion; imports $10.3 billion) goods trade during 2018. US' goods and services trade with Turkey totaled an estimated $24.0 billion (exports: $12.7 billion; imports: $11.2 billion) in 2017. The trade deficit was $143 million in 2018.

The US exports of goods and services to Turkey involved 68,000 jobs in 2015.

== Culture & Media ==
=== Midnight Express (1978 film) ===
The 1978 American semi-biographical film Midnight Express was banned in Turkey under Article 301 of the Turkish Penal Code, which caused a strain on U.S.–Turkish relations. The movie was widely perceived in Turkey as a revenge for the Turkish invasion of Cyprus in 1974 and the establishment of the self-declared Turkish Federated State of Cyprus in 1975, recognized only by Turkey. It was filmed almost entirely at Fort Saint Elmo in Valletta, Malta, which had played an important role during the Great Siege of Malta (1565) by the Ottoman Navy. The selection of this symbolic location, despite the existence of more economical alternatives closer to or within the United States, led to the perception that it conveyed a veiled warning message to Turkey regarding the fate of Cyprus. (Note: During the Great Siege of Malta in 1565, Fort Saint Elmo was captured by the forces of Ottoman admiral and corsair Turgut Reis, but he was mortally wounded, and the arrival of the combined fleets of the Holy League eventually compelled the Ottomans to lift the siege. Five years later, the Ottomans conquered Cyprus between 1570 and 1571, which led to the Battle of Lepanto (1571), the first major defeat of the Ottoman Navy, but the Ottoman Turks quickly rebuilt their fleet and in 1573 they reconquered Cyprus and other territories lost to the Republic of Venice, as well as reconquering Tunisia from the Spanish Empire in 1574.) Most of the vilified Turkish characters in the movie were portrayed by Greek and Armenian actors. Both within Turkey and Iran, the film generated comparisons with the anti-Iranian movie Not Without My Daughter. However, many creators associated with Midnight Express later apologized the film's wholesale vilification of Turkish people.

=== Valley of the Wolves (2003 TV series) ===
Valley of the Wolves sparked intense interest to the point that the US ambassador to Ankara and Turkey's foreign minister exchanged positions on the fictional TV show. Both state officials were anxious to appear conciliatory, however they shared their opinions and perspectives on massacres of civilians at a wedding party, and multiple summary executions, and most controversial was on the depiction of the Abu Ghraib prison. Abu Ghraib prison became famous by Abu Ghraib torture and prisoner abuse.

=== Turks renowned for their accomplishments in the United States ===
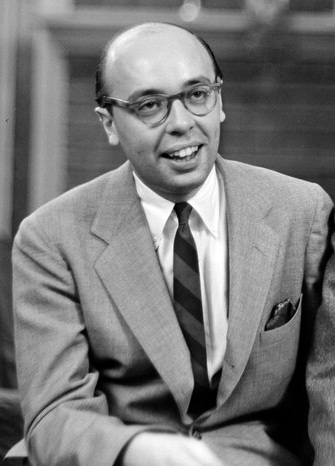
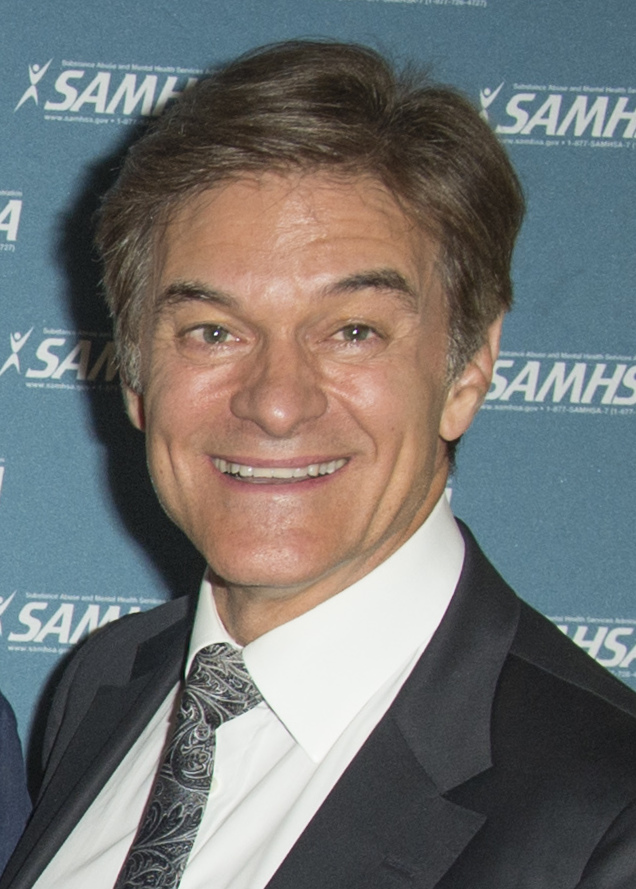
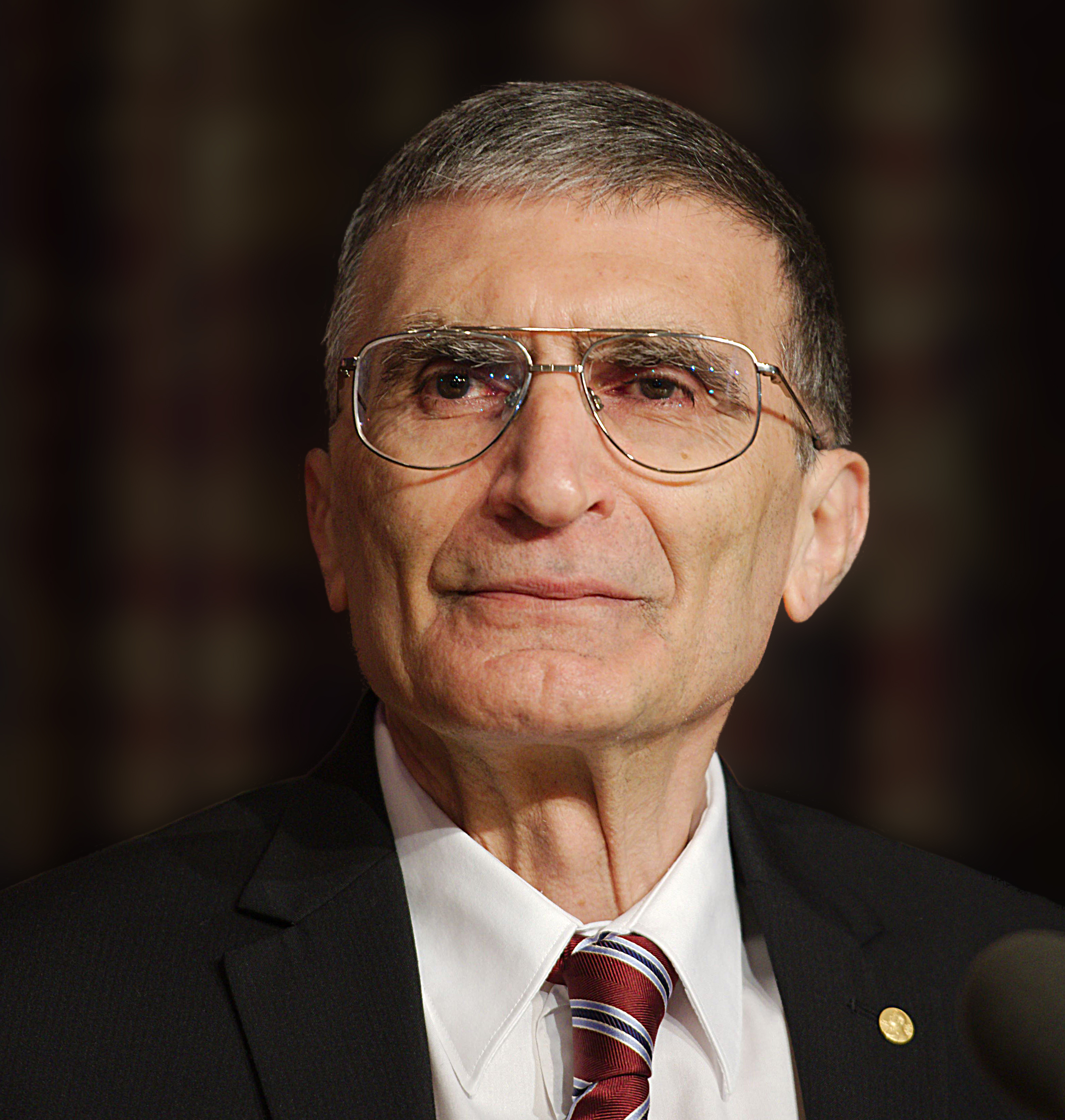
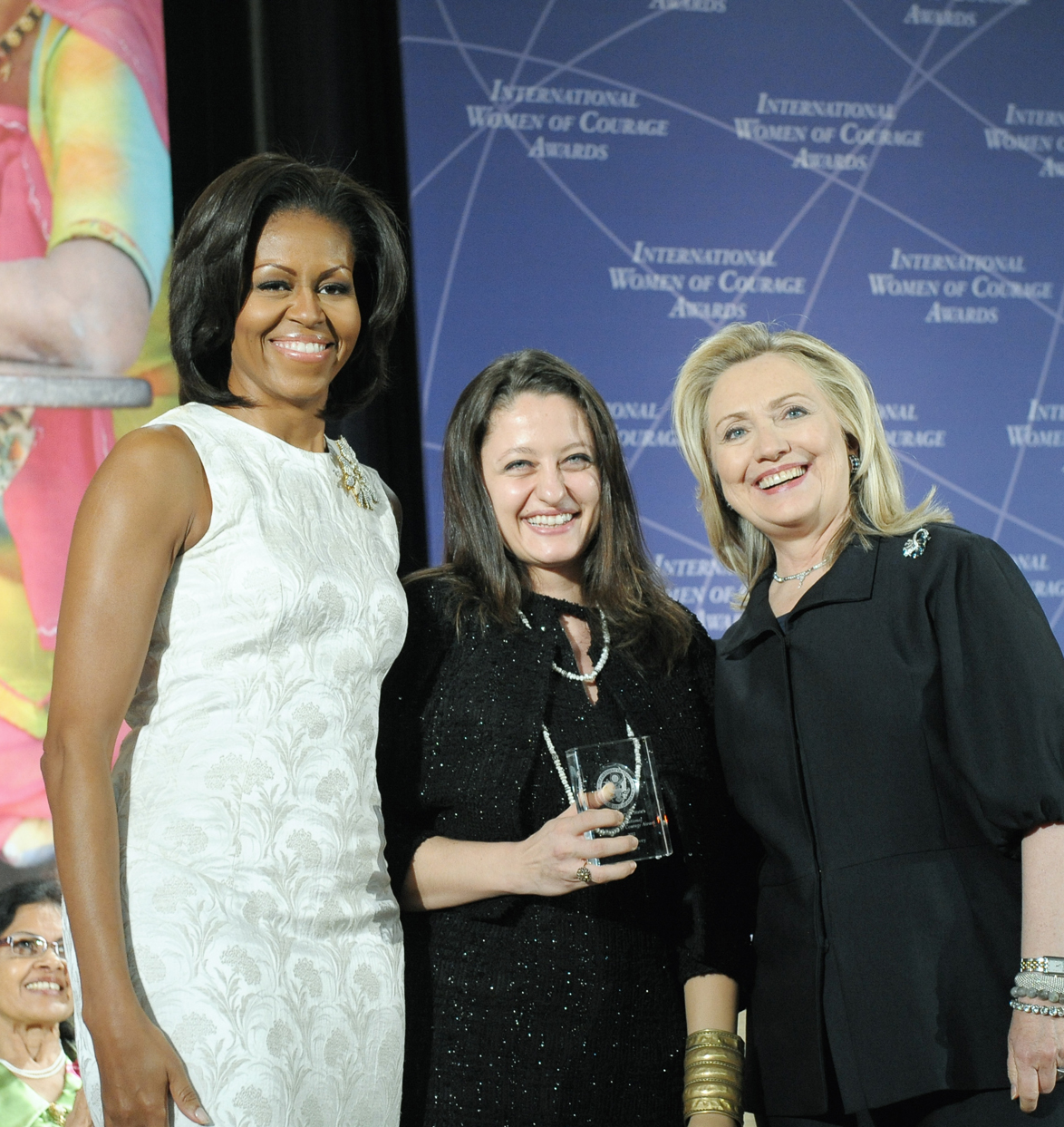

Turks renowned for their accomplishments in the United States include Ahmet Ertegun (1923–2006), the founding chairman of Atlantic Records between 1947 and 2006. He discovered and championed many leading rhythm and blues and rock musicians. Ertegun also wrote classic blues and pop songs. He has been described as "one of the most significant figures in the modern recording industry." Ertegun served as the chairman of the Rock and Roll Hall of Fame and museum, located in Cleveland, Ohio. In 2017 he was inducted into the Rhythm and Blues Music Hall of Fame in recognition of his work in the music business. Ertegun helped foster ties between the United States and Turkey, his birthplace. He served as the chairman of the American Turkish Society for over 20 years until his death. He also co-founded the New York Cosmos soccer team of the original North American Soccer League.

Mehmet Oz (born June 11, 1960), also known as Dr. Oz, is a Turkish-American television presenter, physician, author, professor emeritus of cardiothoracic surgery at Columbia University, former political candidate, and President Donald Trump's nominee to serve as administrator of the Centers for Medicare & Medicaid Services during his second presidency. He was previously a member of the President's Council on Sports, Fitness, and Nutrition between 2018 and 2022. The son of Turkish immigrants, Oz was raised in Wilmington, Delaware, and graduated from Harvard University and the University of Pennsylvania. He subsequently began his residency in surgery at Columbia University Irving Medical Center in 1986. In 2001, Oz became a professor of surgery at Columbia University, and later retired to professor emeritus in 2018. In 2003, Oprah Winfrey was the first guest on the Discovery Channel series Second Opinion with Dr. Oz, and he was a regular guest on The Oprah Winfrey Show, making more than sixty appearances. In 2009, The Dr. Oz Show, a daily television program about medical matters and health, was launched by Winfrey's Harpo Productions and Sony Pictures Television, running for 13 seasons. Oz ran in the 2022 U.S. Senate election in Pennsylvania as a conservative Republican, the first Muslim candidate for Senate to be nominated by either major party. Oz lost the election to the Democratic nominee John Fetterman.

Aziz Sancar (born September 8, 1946) is a Turkish molecular biologist specializing in DNA repair, cell cycle checkpoints, and circadian clock. In 2015, he was awarded the Nobel Prize in Chemistry along with Tomas Lindahl and Paul L. Modrich for their mechanistic studies of DNA repair. He has made contributions on photolyase and nucleotide excision repair in bacteria that have changed his field. Sancar is currently the Sarah Graham Kenan Professor of Biochemistry and Biophysics at the University of North Carolina School of Medicine and a member of the UNC Lineberger Comprehensive Cancer Center. He is the co-founder of the Aziz & Gwen Sancar Foundation, which is a non-profit organization to promote Turkish culture and to support Turkish students in the United States.

Şafak Pavey (born July 10, 1976) is a Turkish diplomat, columnist and politician. She was a member of the Turkish Grand National Assembly from the main opposition Republican People's Party (CHP) representing Istanbul Province. She is the first disabled woman ever elected to the Turkish parliament, and is a member of the United Nations Committee on the Rights of Persons with Disabilities. In 1996, before she turned 20, her left arm and left leg were amputated after a train accident in Switzerland. One year later, she went to London, United Kingdom, to pursue her education. She studied international relations at the University of Westminster and completed her post-graduate studies at the London School of Economics. In 2012, Pavey was honored by the United States Department of State with the International Women of Courage Award.

== Public relations ==
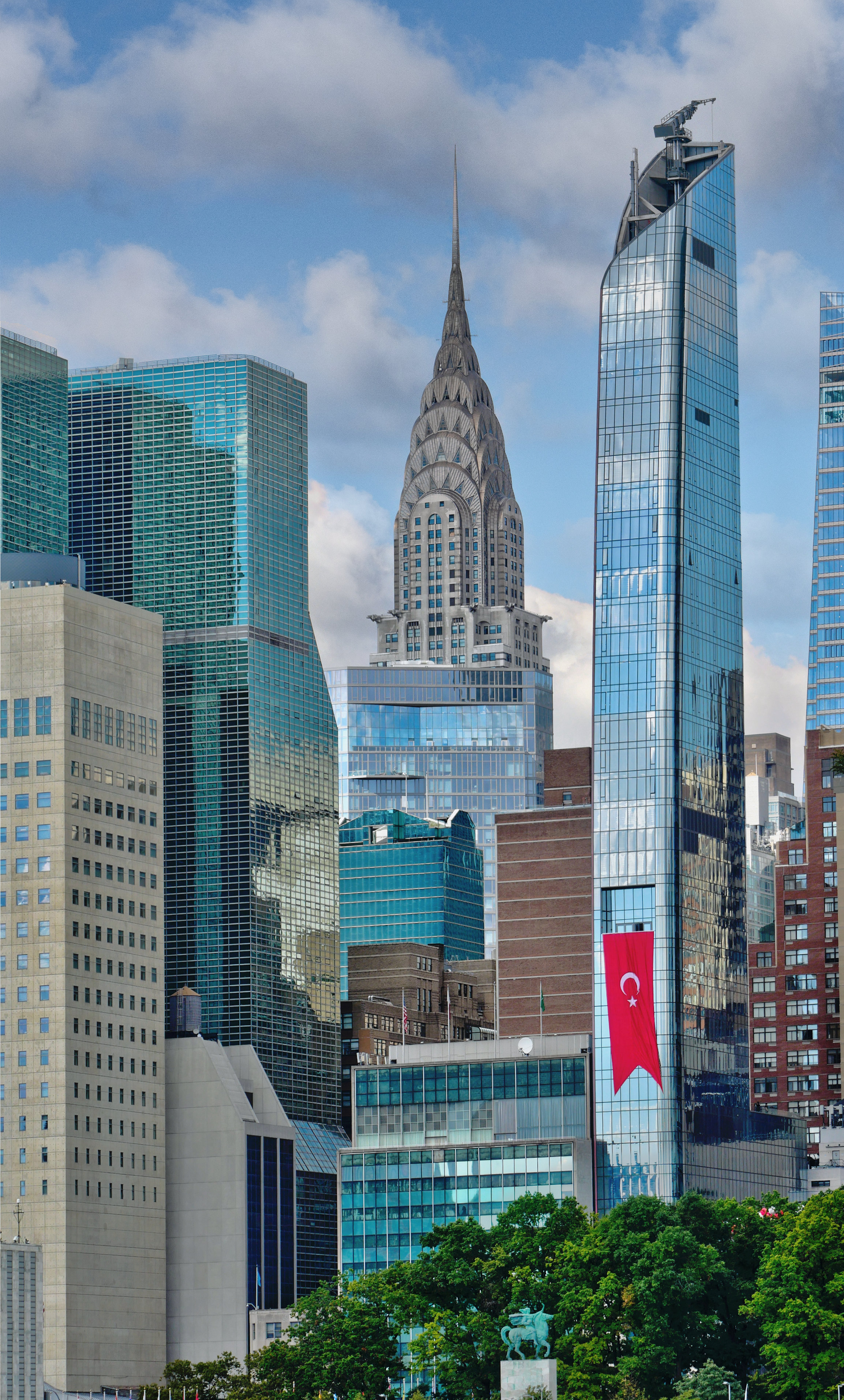
Turkish House in Manhattan, NY

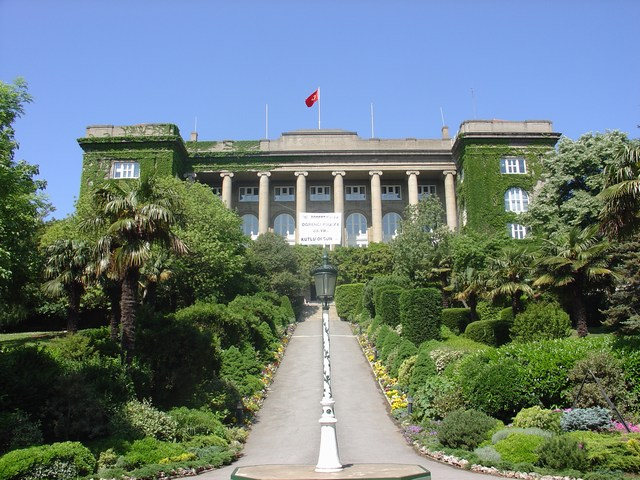
Founded in 1863, Robert College in Istanbul is the oldest continuously operating American school outside the US

=== Turkish House ===
The Turkish House (also called Türkevi Center) is a 561-foot-high (171 m), 36-floor skyscraper located at 821 United Nations Plaza (First Avenue) in Turtle Bay, Manhattan, New York City, United States, across from the headquarters of the United Nations. Turkish House serves as the headquarters of multiple Turkish diplomatic missions in New York City, as well as a center of Turkish cultural activity.

Designed by Perkins Eastman, it has 36 stories and reaches a height of 561 feet (171 m) from the ground to the roof. The building contains about 220,000 square feet (20,000 m^{2}) of usable space, of which 180,000 square feet (17,000 m^{2}) is used by the Permanent Mission of Turkey to the United Nations and the Consulate General of Turkey in New York City; the rest is residential space. The curved facade is an allusion to the crescent on the flag of Turkey, while the top of the skyscraper is shaped like a tulip, the national flower of Turkey. Construction works commenced in September 2017 and the building was largely completed by May 2021.

=== American schools in Turkey ===
Established in 1863 by Christopher Robert, a wealthy American philanthropist, and Cyrus Hamlin, a missionary devoted to education, Robert College in Istanbul is the oldest continuously operating American school outside the United States. Six years after its foundation, with the permission (Ottoman Turkish: irade) of the Ottoman Sultan, the first campus (currently housing Boğaziçi University) was built in Bebek at the ridge of the Rumeli Castle. Hamlin, who became the first president of Robert College, was preoccupied with the construction of the campus such that George Washburn acted as the de facto head of the college from 1871 onwards. In 1877, he was officially named president by the trustees. During his tenure between 1877 and 1903, Washburn "gradually assembled a faculty of distinguished scholars who firmly established the college's academic reputation."

Christopher Robert died in 1878, leaving a significant portion of his wealth to the college. In that same year, a college catalog was compiled, providing general information and an outline of the courses of study. Defining the aims of the college, the catalog stated: "The object of the College is to give to its students, without distinction of race or religion, a thorough educational equal in all respects to that obtained at a first-class American college and based upon the same general principles."

After George Washburn, Robert College was administrated by Caleb Frank Gates Sr. (1903–1932). The school adopted a strictly secular educational model in accordance with the republican principles of Turkey and Atatürk's reforms since 1923. Robert College, at various points of its existence, had junior high school, high school, and university sections under the names Robert Academy, Robert Yüksek and American College for Girls. Since 1971, the present-day Robert College functions only as a high school on its Arnavutköy campus (formerly the campus of American College for Girls), yet it retains the title of "College". The Bebek campus was turned over to the Republic of Turkey for use as a public university named Boğaziçi University, the renamed continuation of Robert College's university section.

- Bursa American College for Girls (1854–1928)
- Robert College (founded 1863) in Istanbul
- Talas American College (1871–1968) in Kayseri
- Üsküdar American Academy (founded 1876) in Istanbul
- American Collegiate Institute (founded 1878) in İzmir
- Anatolia College in Merzifon (1886–1924) in Amasya

=== Turkish schools in the United States ===
Bay Atlantic University (BAU) in Washington, D.C., was established by Bahçeşehir University.

=== Lobbying and think tanks ===
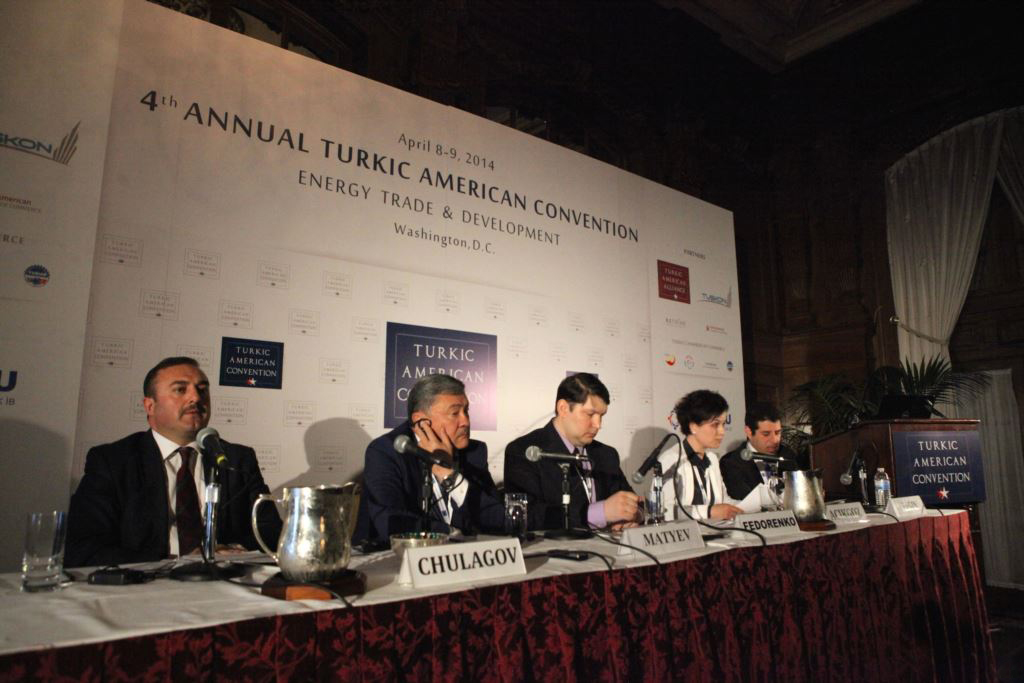
4th Annual Turkic American Convention

The Turkish lobby in the United States is a lobby that works on behalf of the Turkish government to promote the nation's interests with the US government. The Turkish Coalition of America (TCA) is an educational, congressional advocacy, and charitable organization that was incorporated in February 2007.

The Office of Defense Cooperation Turkey is a United States Security Assistance Organization working on issues related to Turkey.

Research, Advocacy, and Analysis
| Turkish Think Tanks | US Think Tanks |
|---|---|
| International Strategic Research Organization: Turkish Centre for International Relations & Strategic Analysis: | American Enterprise Institute: Michael Rubin, Desmond Lachman, Danielle Pletka; Middle East Forum: Daniel Pipes; The Heritage Foundation: James Phillips; The Washington Institute for Near East Policy: Soner Cagaptay |
| Turkish University & Special programs | US University & Special programs |
| | Stanford University: Brett McGurk |
| Turkish Journalist | US Journalist |
| | Washington Post: David Ignatius |

=== Opinion Surveys ===
According to a survey conducted in the spring of 2017 and released in August, 72% of Turks see the United States as a threat to Turkey's security. Furthermore, the US was perceived as a greater threat to security than Russia or China. According to PBS, opinions of the US dropped steadily from 1999/2000 (52% in Turkey in 1999/2000) and in 2006, favorable opinions dropped significantly in predominantly Muslim countries, which ranged from 12% in Turkey to 30% in Indonesia and Egypt. A 2019 survey conducted by the Pew Research Center showed 73% of Turks had a negative view of the United States, with only 20% having a positive view, the lowest among countries polled. The same study also showed only 11% of Turks had confidence in the US leader at the time of the survey, President Donald Trump, with 84% having no confidence in him. A 2024 survey conducted by the Pew Research Center showed only 8% of Turks had confidence in US President Joe Biden. According to a 2026 Pew Research Center survey, 13% of Turks had a favorable view of the United States, while 84% had a negative view.

The following histogram shows the percentage of Turks that viewed the United States favorably according to the PEW Global Attitudes Survey:

Results of 2017 BBC World Service:

Results of 2017 BBC World Service poll of whether U.S. influence "in the world is 'mostly positive' or 'mostly negative'."
| Country | Positive | Negative | Neutral | Difference |
|---|---|---|---|---|
| Turkey | 20% | 64% | 16% | -44 |

== Diplomatic exchanges ==
=== Diplomacy and embassies ===
The United States has sent many ambassadors to Turkey since October 12, 1927. Turkey has maintained many high-level contacts with the United States.

Resident diplomatic missions
| of Turkey in the United States | of the United States in Turkey |
| Washington, D.C. (Embassy); Boston (Consulate-General); Chicago (Consulate–General); Houston (Consulate–General); Los Angeles (Consulate–General); Miami (Consulate–General); New York City (Consulate–General) | Ankara (Embassy); Istanbul (Consulate General); Adana (Consulate); Izmir (Consular Agency) |

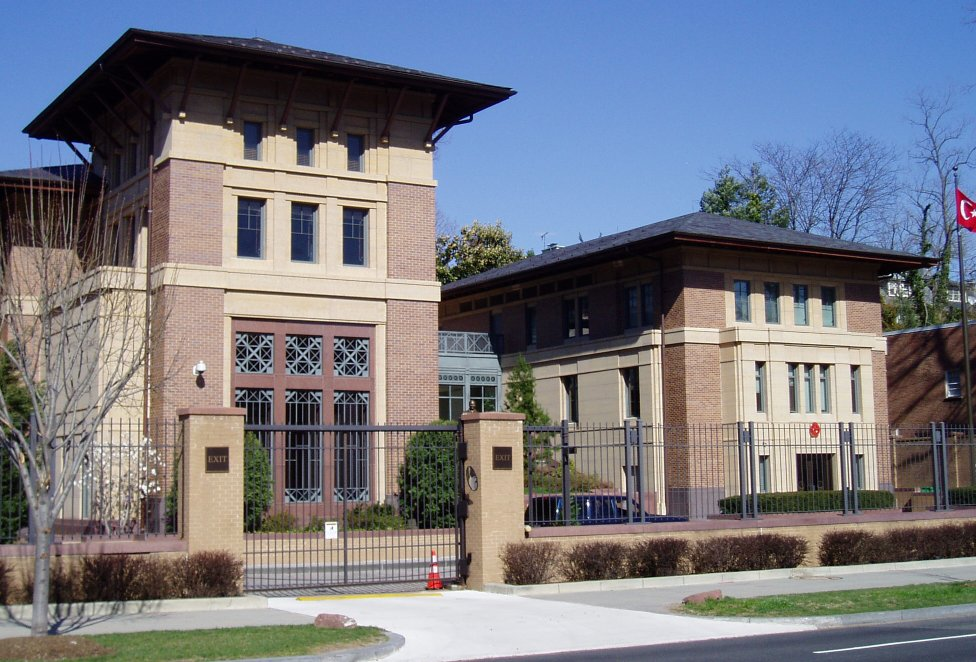
Embassy of Turkey in Washington, D.C.

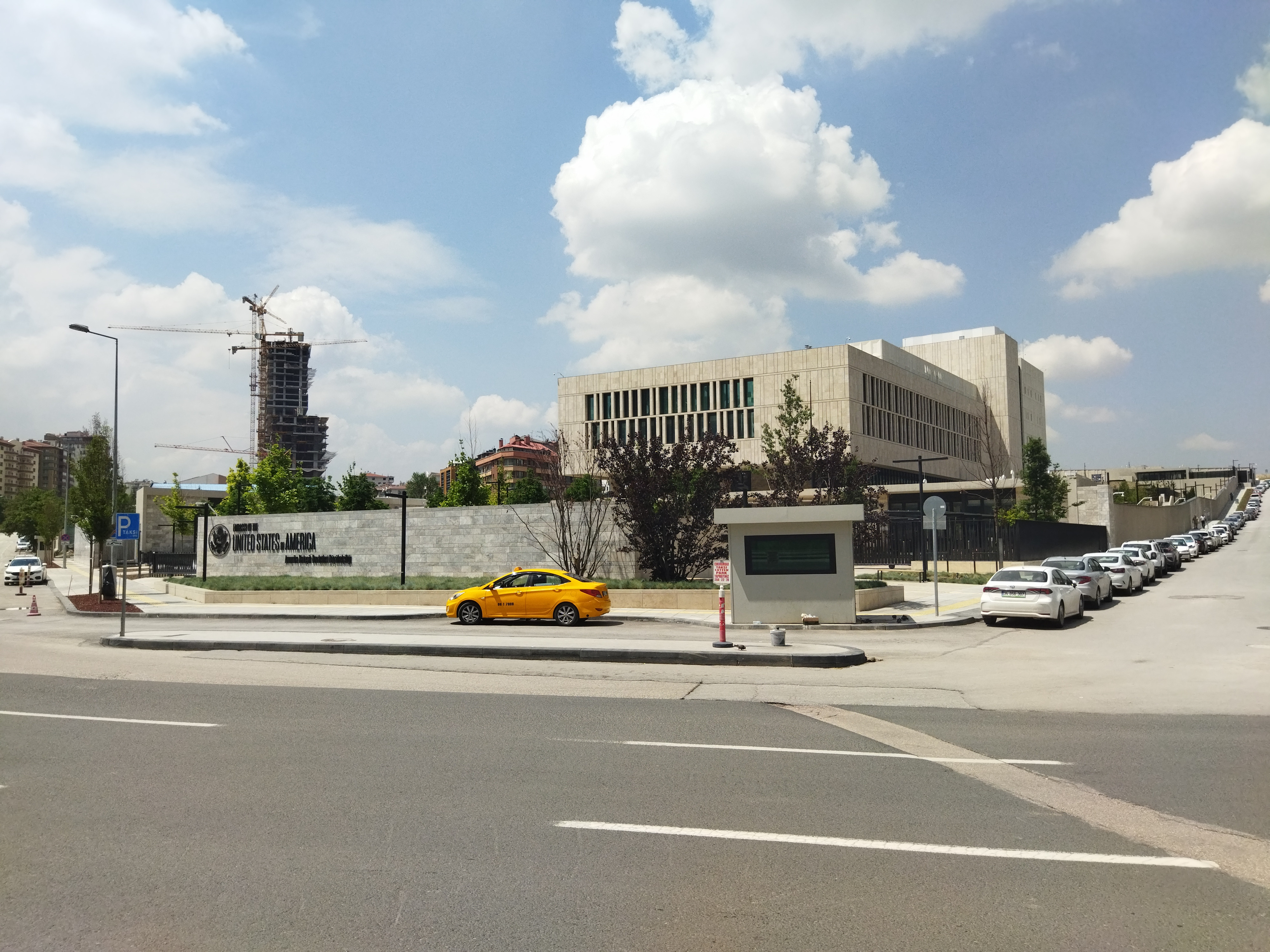
Embassy of the United States in Ankara

=== State and official visits ===
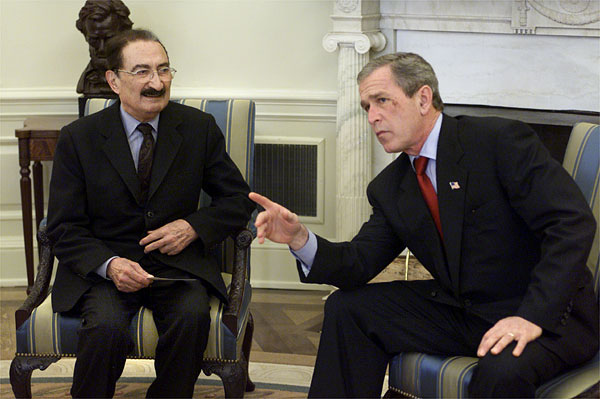
U.S. President W. Bush and Turkish Prime Minister Ecevit, White House, January 16. 2002

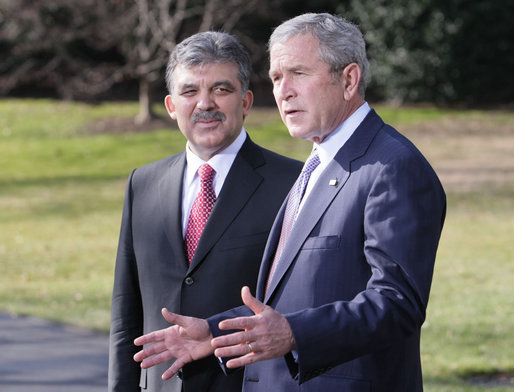
U.S. President George W. Bush and Turkish President Abdullah Gül, White House, January 8, 2008

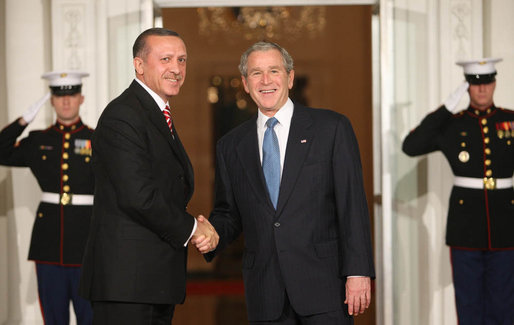
Turkish Prime Minister Recep Tayyip Erdoğan and U.S. President George W. Bush, White House, November 2008;

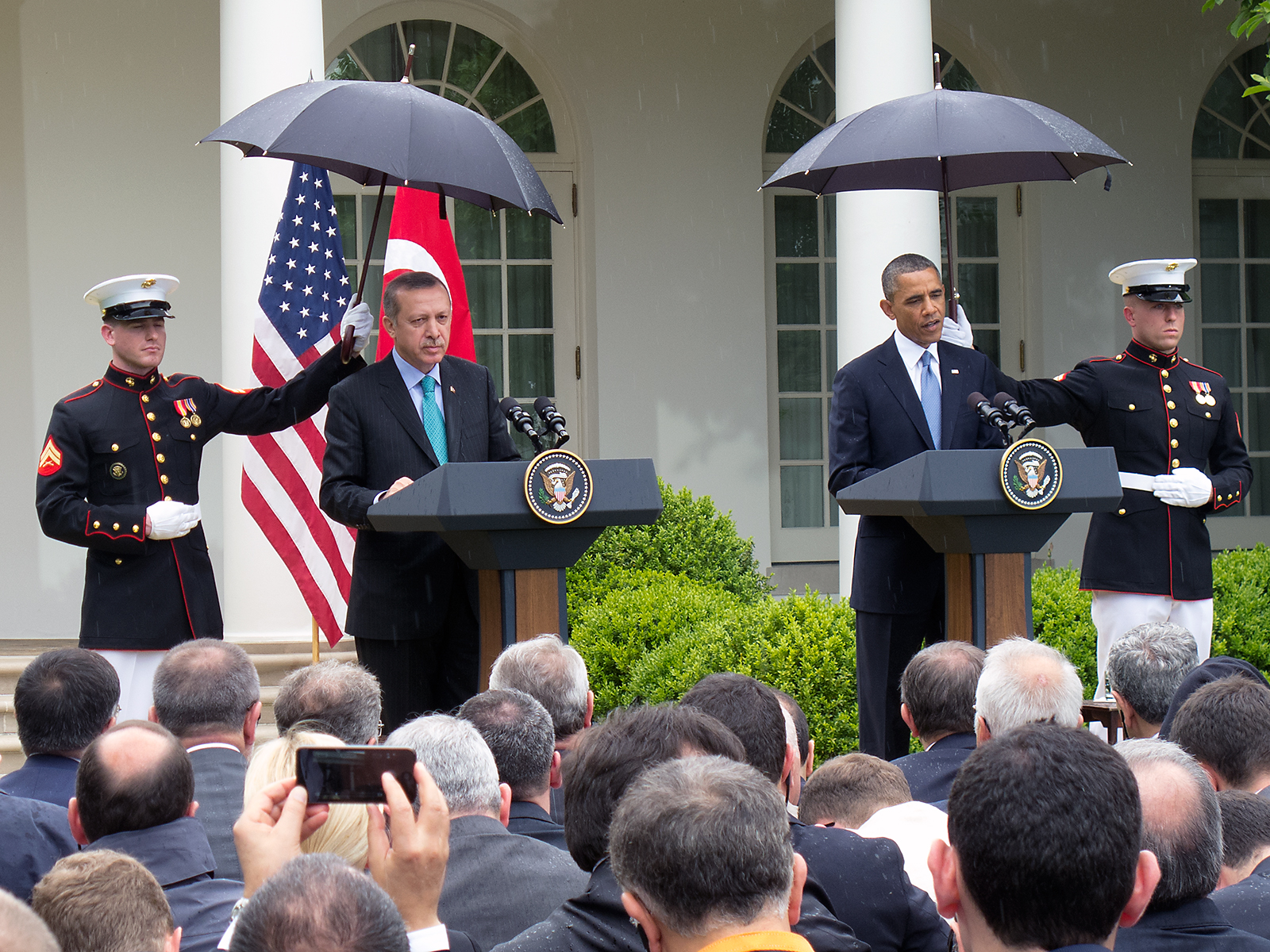
U.S. President Obama and Turkish Prime Minister Erdoğan, White House, May 2013

State and official visits

Since establishing relations, there have been 16 official visits.

1. 12/07/59, Çankaya Mansion, President of Turkey Celal Bayar, President of the United States Dwight D. Eisenhower
2. June 22–23, 1964, White House, President of the United States Lyndon B. Johnson, Prime Minister of Turkey İsmet İnönü
3. 05/31/78, White House, President of the United States Jimmy Carter, Prime Minister of Turkey Bülent Ecevit
4. July 20–22, 1991, Ankara and Istanbul, President of Turkey Turgut Özal, President of the United States George H. W. Bush
5. 09/27/99, White House, President of the United States Bill Clinton, Prime Minister of Turkey Bülent Ecevit
6. 11/15/99, Çankaya Köşkü, Ankara, President of Turkey Süleyman Demirel, President of the United States Bill Clinton
7. 09/04/00, White House, President of the United States Bill Clinton, President of Turkey Ahmet Necdet Sezer
8. June 27–30, 2004, Ankara and Istanbul, President of Turkey Ahmet Necdet Sezer, President of the United States George W. Bush
9. 01/08/08, White House, President of the United States George W. Bush, President of Turkey Abdullah Gül
10. April 6–7, 2009, Ankara and Istanbul, President of Turkey Abdullah Gül, President of the United States Barack Obama
11. 05/16/13, White House, President of the United States Barack Obama, Prime Minister of Turkey Recep Tayyip Erdoğan
12. 08/24/16, Çankaya Köşkü, Ankara, Prime Minister of Turkey Binali Yıldırım, Vice President of the United States Joe Biden
13. 05/16/17, White House, President of the United States Donald Trump, President of Turkey Recep Tayyip Erdoğan
14. 11/09/17, White House, Washington, D.C., Vice President of the United States Mike Pence, Prime Minister of Turkey Binali Yıldırım
15. 11/13/19, White House, Washington, D.C., President of the United States Donald Trump, President of Turkey Recep Tayyip Erdoğan
16. 09/25/25, White House, Washington, D.C., President of the United States Donald Trump, President of Turkey Recep Tayyip Erdoğan

==== 1999 Clinton visit ====
President Bill Clinton visited Ankara, İzmit, Ephesus and Istanbul on November 15–19, 1999. It was an official state visit during which he also attended the Organization for Security and Cooperation in Europe's (OSCE) summit meeting.

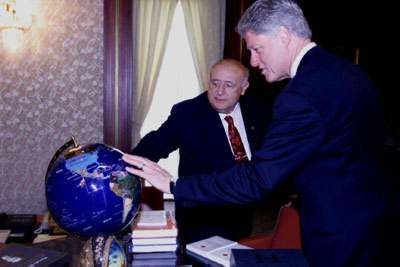
Demirel, Clinton, Çankaya Mansion, November 15. 1999

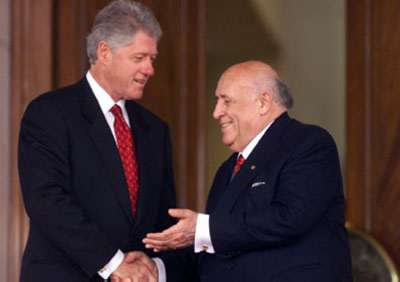
Clinton, Demirel

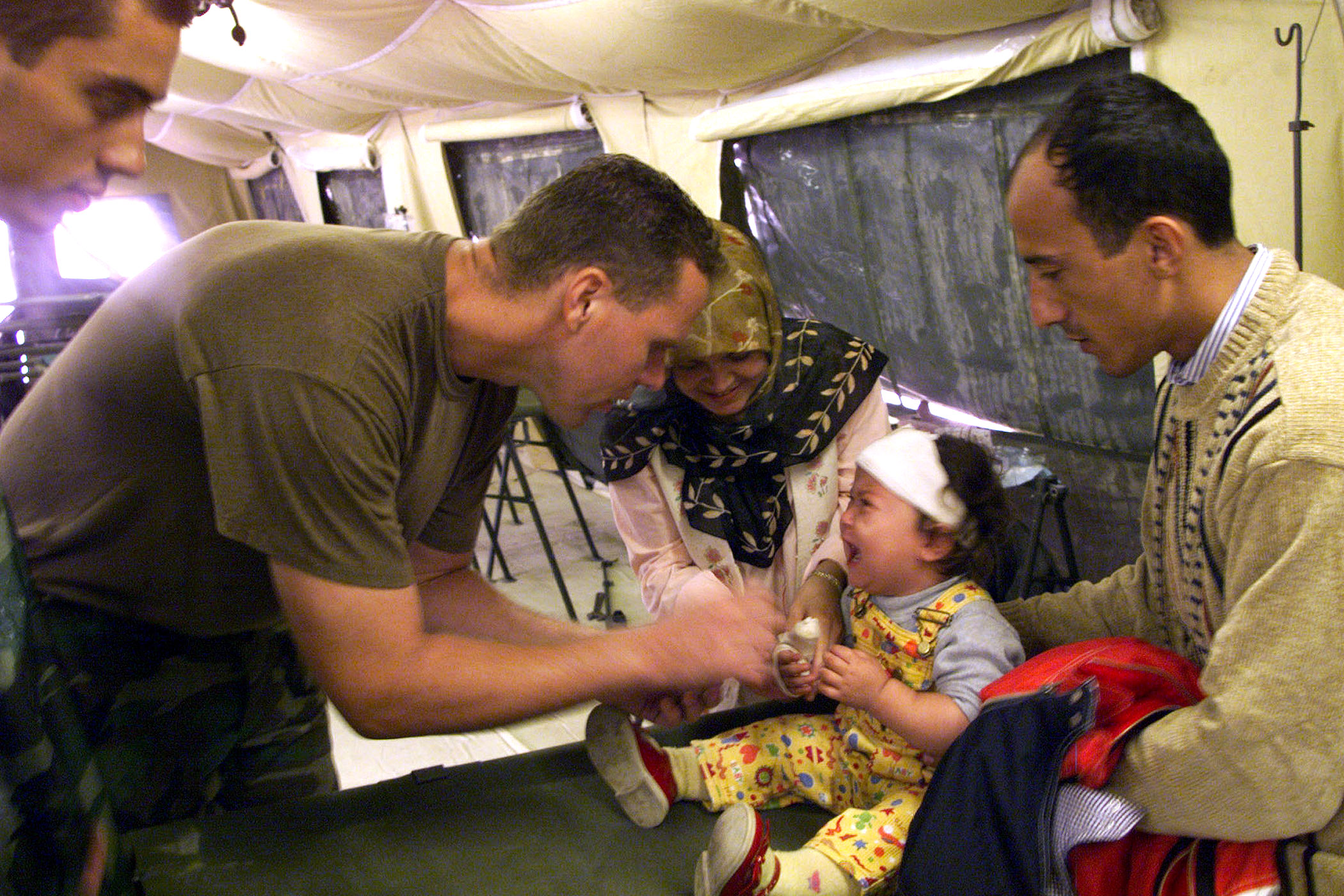
Operation Avid Response

Turkey after the earthquake

==== 2009 Obama visit ====
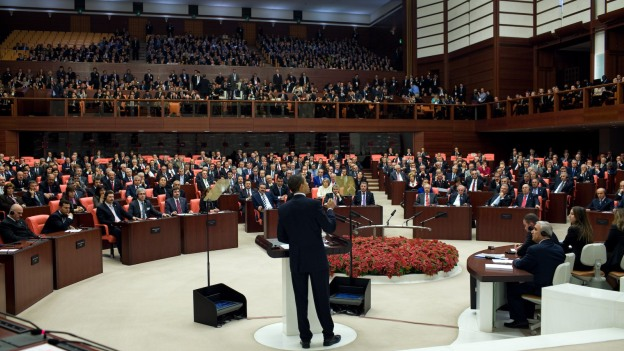
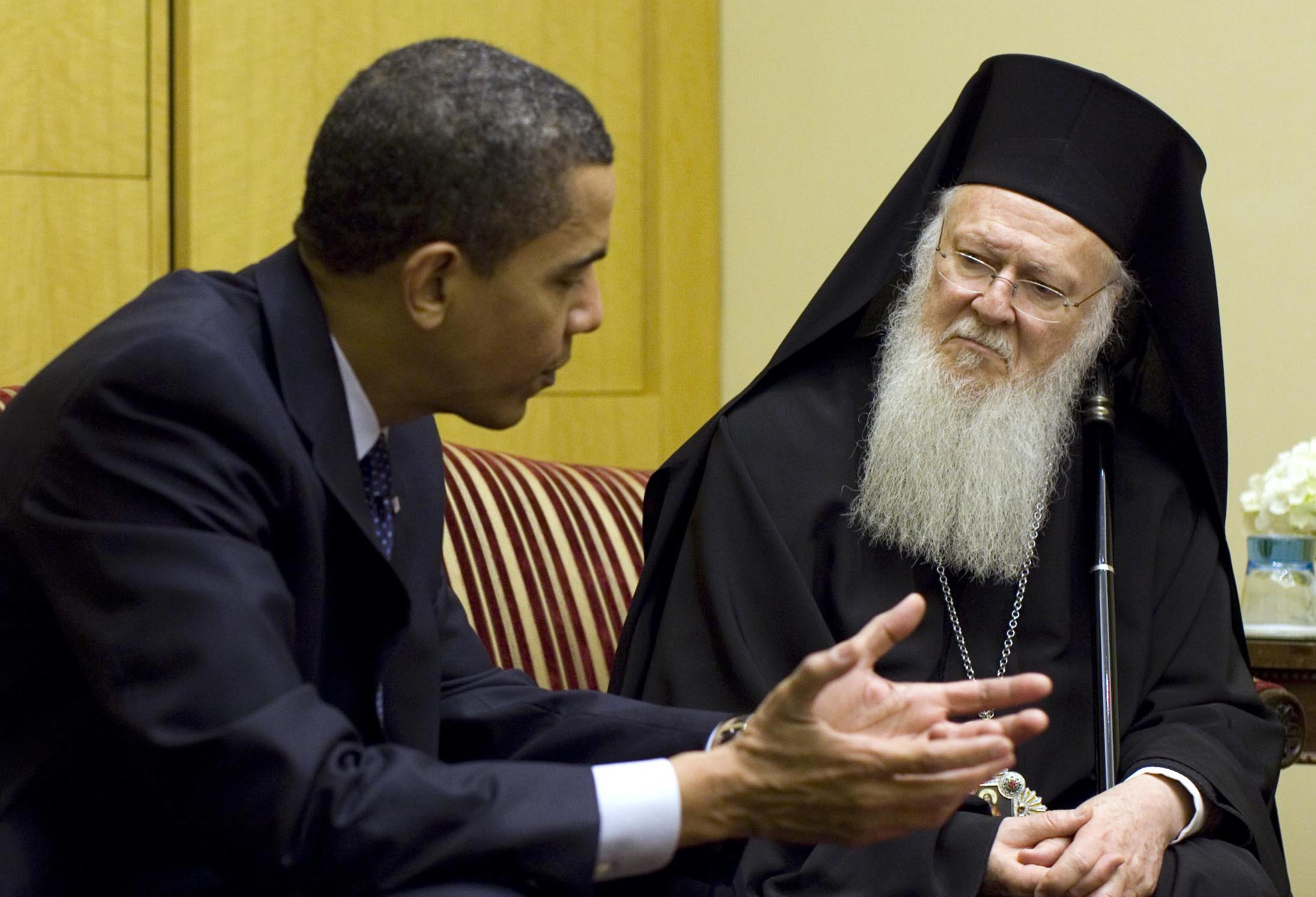

Relations between Turkey and the United States markedly improved during the Obama administration's first term, but the two countries were nevertheless unable to reach their ambitious goals. Obama made his first official visit to Turkey at Ankara and Istanbul April 6–7, 2009. There US critics who claimed that Turkey should not be rewarded by an early presidential visit as its government had been systematically reorienting foreign policy onto an Islamist axis. Former U.S. Ambassador to Turkey Mark Parris remarked: "Whatever the merits of this argument, the Obama administration, by scheduling the visit, have decisively rejected it."

Turkish President Gül later referred to the visit as "evidence of a vital partnership between Turkey and the US," whilst Turkish Foreign Minister Ahmet Davutoğlu pointed out that they were "changing the psychological atmosphere" of what was before "seen as a military relationship". Obama clarified: "We are not solely strategic partners, we are also model partners." With this change in terminology, "The President wanted to stress the uniqueness of this relationship. This is not an ordinary relationship, it's a prototype and unique relationship." A US House Committee on Foreign Affairs hearing, The United States and Turkey: A Model Partnership, chaired by Head of the Subcommittee on Europe Robert Wexler was convened after "the historic visit that Obama paid to Turkey", and concluded that "this cooperation is vital for both of the two states in an environment in which we face serious security issues in Afghanistan, Iraq, Iran, the Balkans, Black Sea, Caucuses and the Middle East, besides a global financial crisis".

After Obama's visit, Turkish Prime Minister Recep Tayyip Erdoğan and Chief of the Turkish General Staff İlker Başbuğ hosted US Chairman of the Joint Chiefs of Staff Admiral Mike Mullen in Ankara. During the closed-door meeting, they discussed the pledging of further Turkish support troops to Afghanistan and Pakistan where Turkish authorities have influence, the secure transport of troops and equipment from the port of İskenderun during the withdrawal of U.S. troops from Iraq, and the pro-Kurdish terrorists operating in south-eastern Turkey and northern Iraq.

==== 2013 Erdoğan visit ====
Erdogan (00:37:43): "... We don't need to have other problems ..."

VP Biden, SecState Kerry, PM Erdogan

In May 2013, Erdoğan visited the White House and met with Obama, who said the visit was an opportunity "to return the extraordinary hospitality that the Prime Minister and the Turkish people showed [him] on [his] visit to Turkey four years ago". During their joint press conference, both Obama and Erdoğan stressed the importance of achieving stability in Syria. Erdoğan said that during his time with Obama, "Syria was at the top of [their] agenda" and Obama repeated the United States plan to support the Assad-opposition while applying "steady international pressure". When they were not discussing national security threats, Obama and Erdoğan discussed expanding economic relations between the two countries; Turkey had received over $50 billion in foreign investments, $20 billion of which came from the United States. In 2003, there was only $8 billion in U.S. investment in Turkey; both Erdoğan and Obama praised this recent increase and agreed to continue expanding the trade and investment agreements between the two countries. Erdoğan's visit culminated with talks of stability in the region. Obama stressed the importance of normalizing relations between Turkey and Israel and praised the steps Erdoğan had taken in that process. The process normalizing the Turkish-Israeli relationship had begun and Erdoğan stated that he would continue this process: "We don't need any other problems, issues in the region."

==== 2019 Erdoğan visit ====
In November 2019, Erdogan visited the White House and held meetings with U.S. President Donald Trump.

==== 2025 Erdoğan visit ====
On September 25, 2025, during a meeting in the Oval Office, Donald Trump praised Turkish President Recep Tayyip Erdoğan, stating that Erdoğan "knows about rigged elections better than anybody." Referring to his own time out of office as "exile," Trump claimed they had remained friends throughout, despite what he called a "rigged" 2020 U.S. election. He described Erdoğan as "highly opinionated," adding, "Usually, I don’t like opinionated people, but I always like this one." The comments drew attention because critics have often described Erdoğan's leadership style as increasingly autocratic. During the meeting, Trump hinted at lifting the ban on sale of F-35 to Turkey.

Subject Syria

=== Extradition ===
The extradition relationship between the United States and Turkey is governed by a bilateral treaty signed in Ankara on June 7, 1979, which entered into force on January 1, 1981. This treaty expanded upon an earlier 1923 agreement, broadening the scope of extraditable offenses to include crimes such as narcotics trafficking, hijacking, bribery, and obstruction of justice.

== See also ==
- Foreign relations of Turkey
- Foreign relations of the United States
- Turkish Americans
- Great Famine of Mount Lebanon
- Human rights in Turkey
- Human rights in the United States
- United States recognition of the Armenian genocide
- CIA activities in Turkey
- Turkey in NATO
