= Middle East Technical University =

Public research university in Turkey

Coordinates: 39°53′29″N 32°47′05″E

- Orta Doğu Teknik Üniversitesi
- Motto: Scientia Dux Vitae Certissimus (Latin)
- Motto in English: Science is the truest guide in life
- Type: Public research university
- Established: November 15, 1956; 69 years ago
- Affiliations: EAIE; IIE; SEFI; CIEE; UNICA; ABET; EUA; CoHE; Magna Charta; Bologna; Erasmus; McDonnell International Scholars Academy
- Budget: $200 million (2026)
- President: Ahmet Yozgatlıgil
- Faculty: 1,892
- Students: 23,395
- Undergraduates: 18,456
- Postgraduates: 4,546
- Location: Çankaya, Ankara
- Campus: Suburban, 11,100 acres (4,500 ha, 45 km²)
- Language: English
- Other campuses: Erdemli; Northern Cyprus
- Colors: Red White
- Nicknames: METU Falcons (American football)
- Website: www.metu.edu.tr

University rankings

Global – Overall
- QS World: =269 (2026)
- THE World: 326–350 (2027)

National – Overall
- QS National: 1 (2026)
- THE National: 1 (2027)

Middle East Technical University (commonly referred to as METU; in Turkish, Orta Doğu Teknik Üniversitesi, ODTÜ) is a public research university located in Ankara, Turkey.

The university offers 41 undergraduate programs across five faculties and 105 master's and 70 doctoral programs through five graduate schools. The main campus of METU spans an area of 11,100 acres (4,500 ha), comprising, in addition to academic and auxiliary facilities, a forest area of 7,500 acres (3,000 ha), and the natural Lake Eymir. METU has more than 120,000 alumni worldwide. The official language of instruction at METU is English.

METU had the greatest share in national research funding by the Scientific and Technological Research Council of Turkey (TÜBİTAK) in the last five years. Over 40% of METU's undergraduate alumni choose to pursue graduate studies.

== History ==
=== Foundation and vision ===
In 1954, Charles Abrams from the MIT School of Architecture and Planning, commissioned by the United Nations to study housing issues and the state of architectural, urban and regional planning education in the Middle East, visited Turkey. Upon completing his survey, Abrams submitted a report to the UN recommending the establishment of a technological institute in Turkey to provide education in architecture and planning. Subsequently, the UN assigned G. Holmes Perkins from the University of Pennsylvania to assist in establishing an institute that would train Turkish architects and urban-regional planners.

Middle East Technical University was founded under the name "Orta Doğu Teknoloji Enstitüsü" (English: Middle East Institute of Technology) on November 15, 1956, by then Turkish Prime Minister Adnan Menderes, the Director-General of Highways Vecdi Diker, and a group of academics. The university was established to contribute to the development of Turkey and the surrounding regions of the Middle East, Balkans, and Caucasus by fostering skilled professionals in the urban planning, engineering and social sciences. "Arrangements and Procedures as for the Foundation of METU, Law No 6213" was enacted on January 22, 1957, whereby the current name "Orta Doğu Teknik Üniversitesi" (ODTÜ) was adopted. Finally, the "Foundation Act No 7907", setting forth the particular standing of METU and establishing it as a juridical entity, was enacted on May 27, 1959.

During the legislative discussions regarding METU, the establishment law was debated in parliament. Democrat Party deputy Münib Hayri Ürgüplü emphasized that "in a period marked by various ideological threats in the Middle East, the university would play a crucial role by educating young people armed with the profound truths of science to effectively confront these challenges". During the legislative discussions regarding the laws for Middle East Technical University, Zakar Tarver, a member of parliament, proposed that the university be exempt from all types of taxation.

The governance of METU was distinctively structured under a Board of Trustees, initially composed of five members, unlike any other institute managed by the Ministry of National Education. Temporary directorship was assumed by Thomas Godfrey until March 1959, with Marvin Sevely also part of the initial foreign faculty.

METU initially started with programs in Architecture and City Planning during the 1956–1957 academic year and expanded to include Mechanical Engineering, Civil Engineering, and programs under the Faculty of Administrative Sciences such as Business Administration, Public Administration, and Industrial Management in subsequent years. Classes were initially held in a small building owned by the Retirement Fund in Kızılay and barracks near the Grand National Assembly of Turkey.

=== Early developments ===
Due to time constraints and the rocky nature of the terrain, it was impossible to prepare the foundation in such a short period. As a solution, Godfrey suggested that the ceremony be not a foundation-laying but rather a groundbreaking event with an excavator.

— Arif Payaslıoğlu (Quoted from Nihat Çokyücel, the Secretary-General at the time), Barakadan Kampusa. Ankara: METU Press, 1996.

In its early days, Middle East Technical University, initially heavily criticized due to its humble facilities resembling a middle school building, quickly embarked on efforts to establish its own campus. Although the campus location had not been finalized, a plan proposed by G. Holmes Perkins was accepted. Amid considerations to use either the lands behind Yalıncak Village or the buildings of the Etimesgut Sugar Factory for the campus site, the government pressed for immediate foundation laying. Consequently, a groundbreaking ceremony was held in Yalıncak Village on October 2, 1957, attended by nearly all ambassadors in Ankara, then-President Celal Bayar, Prime Minister Adnan Menderes, and other ministers. The first chairman of the METU Board of Trustees, Vecdi Diker, had brought an excavator from the General Directorate of Highways to commence the digging. At the start of the 1957–1958 academic year, the Faculty of Architecture, the Faculty of Engineering, and the Faculty of Administrative Sciences were established. In 1959, the establishment of the Faculty of Arts and Sciences was completed. Within the framework of Perkins’ campus plan, the first building designated was the Faculty of Administrative Sciences, and in 1959, a Turkish team comprising Dr. Turgut Cansever, Ertürk Yener, and Mehmet Tataroğlu won an international design competition for it. However, the project was put on hold as the campus location was still not definitively established.

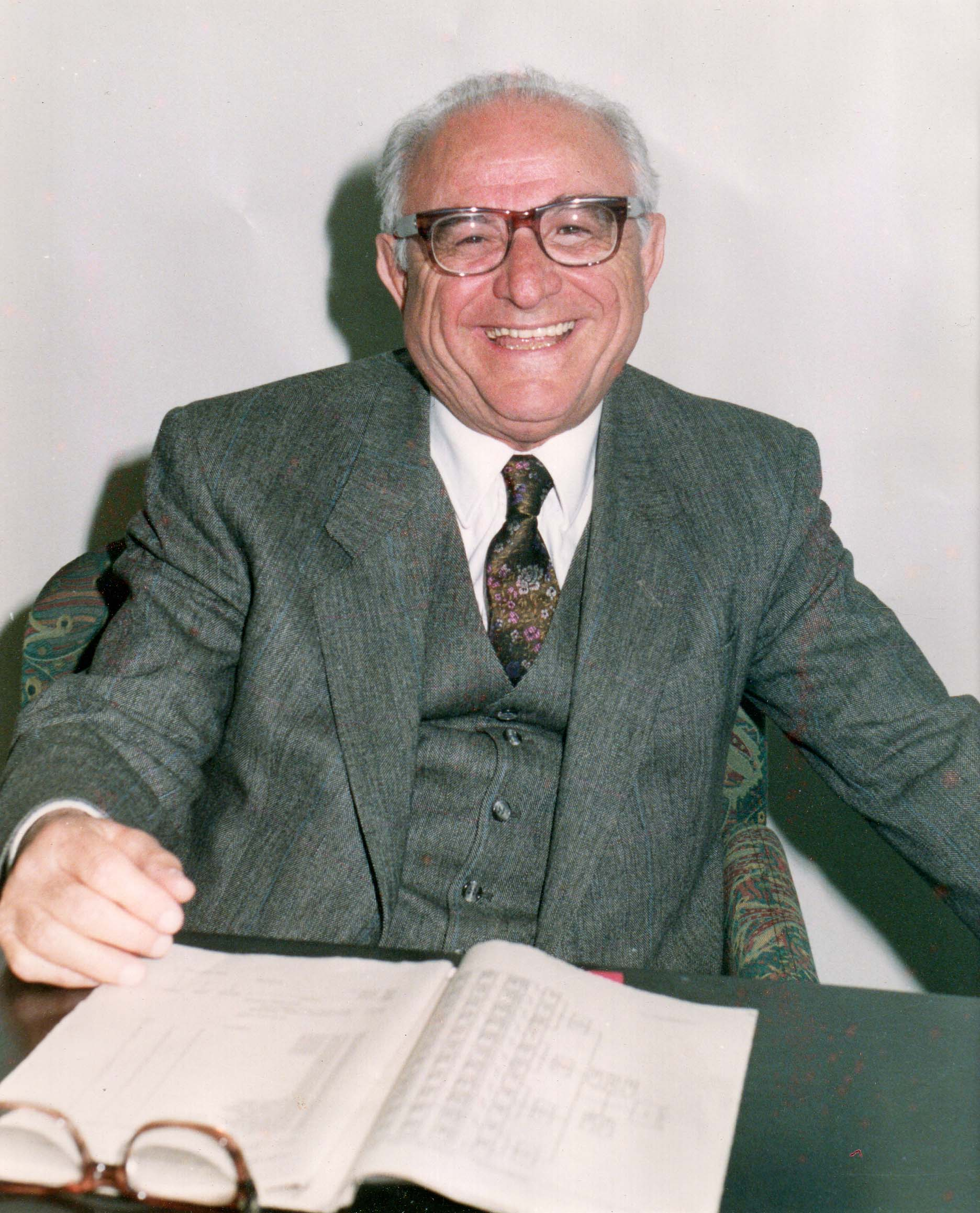
Kemal Kurdaş, who served as the rector from 1961 to 1969

The 1960 Turkish coup d'état led to significant upheaval at METU. Then-Prime Minister Adnan Menderes, a member of the METU Board of Trustees, and MP Ahmet Tokuş were arrested and expelled from the board, spreading fears of the university's potential closure. Colonel Sami Küçük, a member of the National Unity Committee, opposed other junta members who wanted the university closed, arguing it was Adnan Menderes' project, and ensured that educational activities at METU continued. In March 1959, Willis Raymond Woolrich, who also served as the dean of the College of Engineering at the University of Texas, was dismissed as an advisory rector following a law passed in August 1960 that terminated the Board of Trustees' mandate. After Woolrich's rectorship, Edwin S. Burdell, who previously served as president of the Cooper Union for 22 years and as the first dean of the School of Humanities and Social Sciences at the Massachusetts Institute of Technology, took on the role of president at METU. After Burdell's period, Prof. Dr. Turhan Feyzioğlu was appointed as the first Turkish rector of METU. During his speech at the opening ceremony, Rector Feyzioğlu emphasized, "Middle East Technical University is entirely a Turkish university." In June 1960, METU graduated its first class, comprising 30 students including 11 from Mechanical Engineering and 19 from Architecture, and the top student was awarded a prize of 1000 lira along with a plaque.

On October 27, 1960, in response to the military government's decision under Law No. 114 to expel 147 academic staff members from universities, an event known as the 147 Incident, many rectors and faculty members, including Feyzioğlu, resigned in protest; however, Feyzioğlu's resignation was not accepted, and he continued in his role. After Feyzioğlu was elected to the Chamber of Deputies in January 1961, he was succeeded as rector by Prof. Dr. Seha Meray on February 23, 1961. Shortly after Meray's appointment, the university witnessed a student boycott due to uncertainties about the recognition of diplomas and concerns over educational facilities. The boycott ended following discussions with the rector. Meray served as rector for about three months before resigning due to illness, and his duties were temporarily assumed by Uğur Ersoy. After Ersoy's resignation in August 1961, Associate Professor Arif Payaslıoğlu took over for two months.

Twelve days after assuming my position, I walked with the students to the site where the current campus is now located. I was excited, and seeing me, the students became excited as well. That day, we planted trees on METU's land for the first time.

— Kemal Kurdaş, "Bozkırda tek başına: Kurdaş." Atlas, no. 159, June 2006, pp. 78-84.

On April 26, 1961, the Board of Trustees decided on Aşağı Balgat for the new campus, and a new national competition with an international jury was organized. The winning project was by Behruz Çinici and Altuğ Çinici, announced in September 1961. Kemal Kurdaş, who became rector on November 22, 1961, prioritized the campus construction. Initial plans included the Architecture Faculty, laboratories for the Faculty of Arts and Sciences, the rectorate building, the first section of the dining hall, and two dormitory buildings. On December 3, 1961, the first tree-planting activities at METU took place, with students planting 135,000 saplings. During the initial surveys near Yalıncak Village, Kemal Kurdaş identified remnants of historical structures and artifacts, indicating the site's archaeological importance. This discovery was reported to the Ministry of National Education, the General Directorate of Antiquities and Museums, and the Ankara Archaeology Museum, now known as the Museum of Anatolian Civilizations. Subsequently, archaeological excavations were initiated under the direction of archaeologist Burhan Tezcan.

Despite constraints in faculty and infrastructure, METU established departments of mathematics, physics, theoretical physics, chemistry, education, humanities, and psychology, along with a preparatory class, in 1961. The construction blueprint for the campus was finalized in January 1962, prioritizing the completion of the Architecture Faculty and infrastructure tunnels within the first two years. The cornerstone laying ceremony for the Architecture Faculty building took place on May 11, 1962, attended by then-President Cemal Gürsel. Decisions were made to relocate the preparatory class to the new campus, and by summer 1962, four temporary barracks had been constructed to facilitate this transition. The preparatory class began its activities at the new location in October 1962, marking it as the first academic unit to move to the campus. The preparatory class was later formalized into a Preparatory School by the board of trustees. Extensive tree-planting activities followed, with over 1.5 million trees planted by the rector and students. By the academic year 1961–62, student enrollment at METU reached 1,025, increasing to 1,274 by the 1962–63 academic year. The Architecture Faculty building, which cost 12.5 million lira, became operational on September 30, 1963. The new campus was officially inaugurated on October 1, 1963, with a ceremony attended by then-Prime Minister İsmet İnönü. By the start of the 1963–64 academic year, a significant portion of the university had transitioned to the new campus, hosting 1,893 Turkish and 167 foreign students, taught by 310 Turkish and 56 foreign faculty members. From this cohort, 158 undergraduate and 59 graduate students graduated.

This year, Middle East Technical University will celebrate the tenth anniversary of its founding. Currently, the university hosts over 4,000 students from 18 countries, a significant increase from just 500 students five years ago. While the majority of the students are Turkish, the university also educates hundreds of Pakistanis, Iranians, and Arabs, as well as one Israeli, twenty American, and two British students. The language of instruction at the university is English.

— The London Times, May 13, 1966

The METU Library, established in 1956 with a donation of 50 books from the United Nations, began offering services that same year. By 1957, the library staff comprised Furuzan Olşen and Solmaz İzdemir, who both had received master's degrees in librarianship in the United States. On January 4, 1958, to organize the library in a contemporary sense, UNESCO expert Natelle Isley was appointed as the library director. In March 1958, under the foundational principles concerning the library's organization, the American Library of Congress Classification System was adopted. This made METU Library the first in Turkey to utilize a system now commonly employed by many university and research libraries across the country.

In July 1959, UNESCO expert Donald A. Redmond took over as library director. During the tenure of D. R. Kalia, the third director appointed in 1961, the idea of establishing a central library on campus was proposed and accepted in October 1961. William W. Bennett, the fourth and final UNESCO expert, began his tenure as library director in 1962. In September 1962, Paul Wasserman, Director of Libraries at Cornell University, visited Turkey to assess the development of the METU Library and prepared a report that helped secure a financial grant of $30,500 through the AID Cornell project. The year 1963 was primarily dedicated to the completion of campus construction, including the architectural planning of the METU Library. The library's design, still in use today, was developed by architect Behruz Çinici. As UNESCO assistance was concluding, further support was received from CENTO, OECD, and later the United States Agency for International Development (USAID), with the most significant being from USAID. Out of the $4.5 million allocated to the university by USAID, Kemal Kurdaş dedicated $1.5 million to the library. Dr. Robert Downs, Dean of the Library Science Department and Director of Libraries at the University of Illinois, visited and wrote a highly positive report. The library also houses collections named in honor of significant figures, including the John F. Kennedy Memorial Library and a collection donated by the British Government in memory of Winston Churchill. This latter donation added 1,000 volumes to the library's collection, increasing it to 50,000 volumes by the end of 1965.

By the 1963–64 academic years, the total area of completed buildings on campus had exceeded 67,000 square meters. In 1964, the METU Computer Center was established to support administrative data processes, equipped with computers, printers, sorters, and punch card preparation machines. Later that year, a decision was made to enhance the center's role in academic support, leading to the invitation of Turkish academics Dr. Şenol Utku and Dr. Cenap Oran from the Massachusetts Institute of Technology to assist in setting up a computer system. The team opted to lease an IBM 1620 computer system, widely used in American universities, which was installed at the Physics Department in 1965. In the same year, following a competition held to place a monument on campus, the winning Atatürk Monument along with the second-placed Tree of Science were installed at Middle East Technical University.

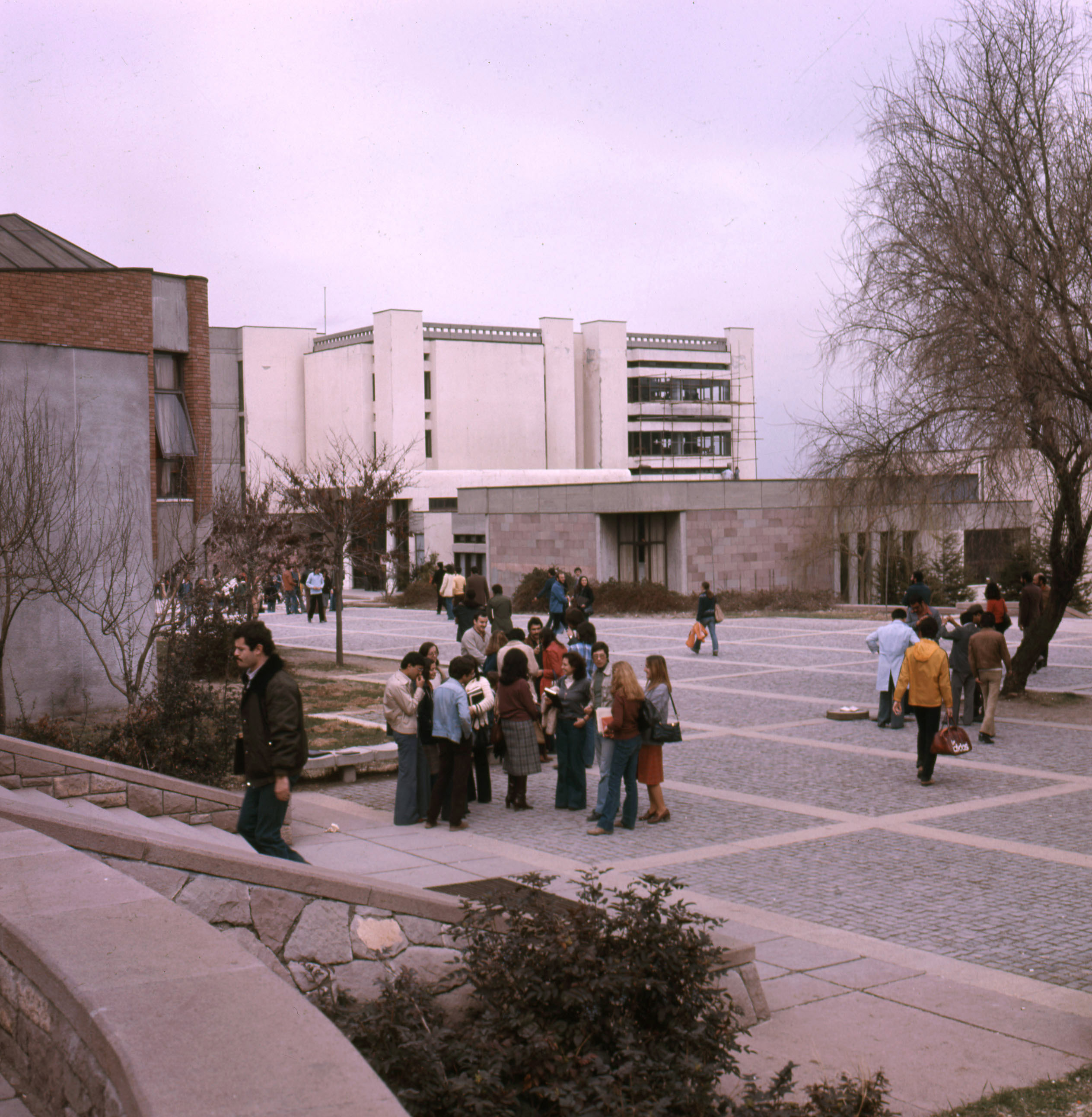
General view of the METU campus, 1961–1980, SALT Research

In 1967, METU focused intensively on scientific projects, conducting 219 projects during the year and receiving the highest number of awards from the Scientific and Technological Research Council of Turkey (TÜBİTAK). At the beginning of the academic year, the university enrolled 1,843 new students using a newly implemented testing method, raising the total student population to 5,127. The faculty increased by 20% to 607 members, and new departments such as Theoretical Chemistry and Computer Sciences were established, alongside the Modern Biology Option. The construction of the Central Library was completed, and 14,620 new books were added. The library's holdings of scientific journals and periodicals rose to 1,456.

In the same year, under the presidency of Rector Kurdaş, the Committee to Rescue and Evaluate Historical Artifacts that Will Be Submerged by the Keban Dam Lake was established, launching an eight-year comprehensive study of the Keban region's archaeology, history, architecture, ethnography, folklore, music, and language, with a particular focus on rescuing archaeological artifacts at risk of submersion due to the dam construction.

=== Recent history ===
In July 1987, following the completion of Rector Gönlübol's term, Prof. Dr. Ömer Saatçioğlu, a faculty member from the Department of Industrial Engineering, was appointed as the rector of METU. In 1988, the University Senate designated May 27 as "METU Day" based on the original enactment date of METU's founding law, and decided to celebrate this day annually with a ceremony. Since then, METU Day has been celebrated on the last working day of the week in which May 27 falls. In 1989, the first Alumni Day, which later became a tradition, was organized, honoring alumni who had reached the 30th anniversary of their graduation with plaques. That same year, the university significantly expanded its computing capacity, reaching a total of one thousand personal computers, established a fiber optic network, and connected to international networks.

In 1987, preliminary work began on establishing a science park, known as Teknokent, aimed at supporting technology-based companies. This initiative led to the opening of the Technology Development Center (TEKMER) in 1990, following a collaboration agreement with the Small and Medium Industry Development Organization.

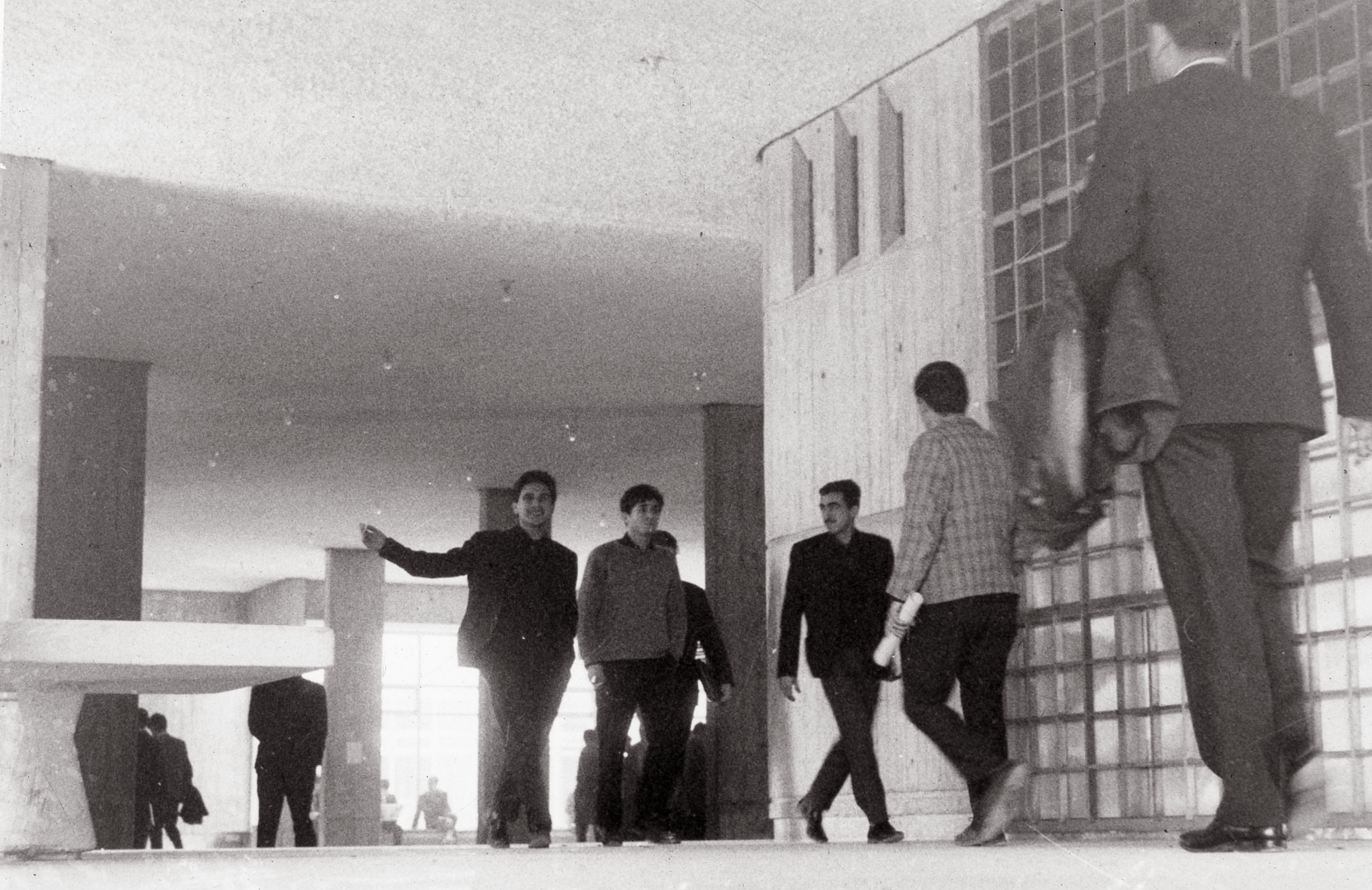
METU Faculty of Architecture, entrance floor interior, 1961–1980, SALT Research

On July 7, 1992, a law was passed to abolish the system of rector appointments by the Council of Higher Education, transitioning to the current electoral system for selecting rectors. Following the end of Ömer Saatçioğlu's term in September 1992, the first elections under this new system resulted in the appointment of Prof. Dr. Süha Sevük, a faculty member from the Department of Civil Engineering, as the rector. That year also saw the establishment of the BİLTİR Center, which included Turkey's first CAD/CAM Laboratory, under the auspices of the rectorate.

On April 12, 1993, Turkey's first internet connection was established through a 64 kbit/s leased line between Ankara and Washington, facilitated by the routers in the METU Computer Center. This achievement led to the creation of Turkey's first internet pages with a .tr domain. In 1994, with the support of Rector Sevük and Secretary-General Mehmet Çalışkan, efforts to establish Radio METU began, and broadcasting started in 1995 on frequency 103.1 FM. Rector Süha Sevük was reelected on June 25, 1996.

In 1998, the METU Development Foundation initiated a project to establish schools across Anatolia, starting with schools in Ankara, Kayseri, Denizli, Mersin and İzmir, with plans to increase the number of schools to between 10 and 12. On November 19, 1998, following a protocol signed with the General Staff of the Turkish Armed Forces and the Defence Industry Agency, the MODSİM-LAB was established. The laboratory, located in a new building on the campus, was operational by June 24, 1999, as a Research and Development Laboratory and later attained center status, becoming known as METU-Turkish Armed Forces MODSİMMER (Modeling and Simulation Applications Research Center).

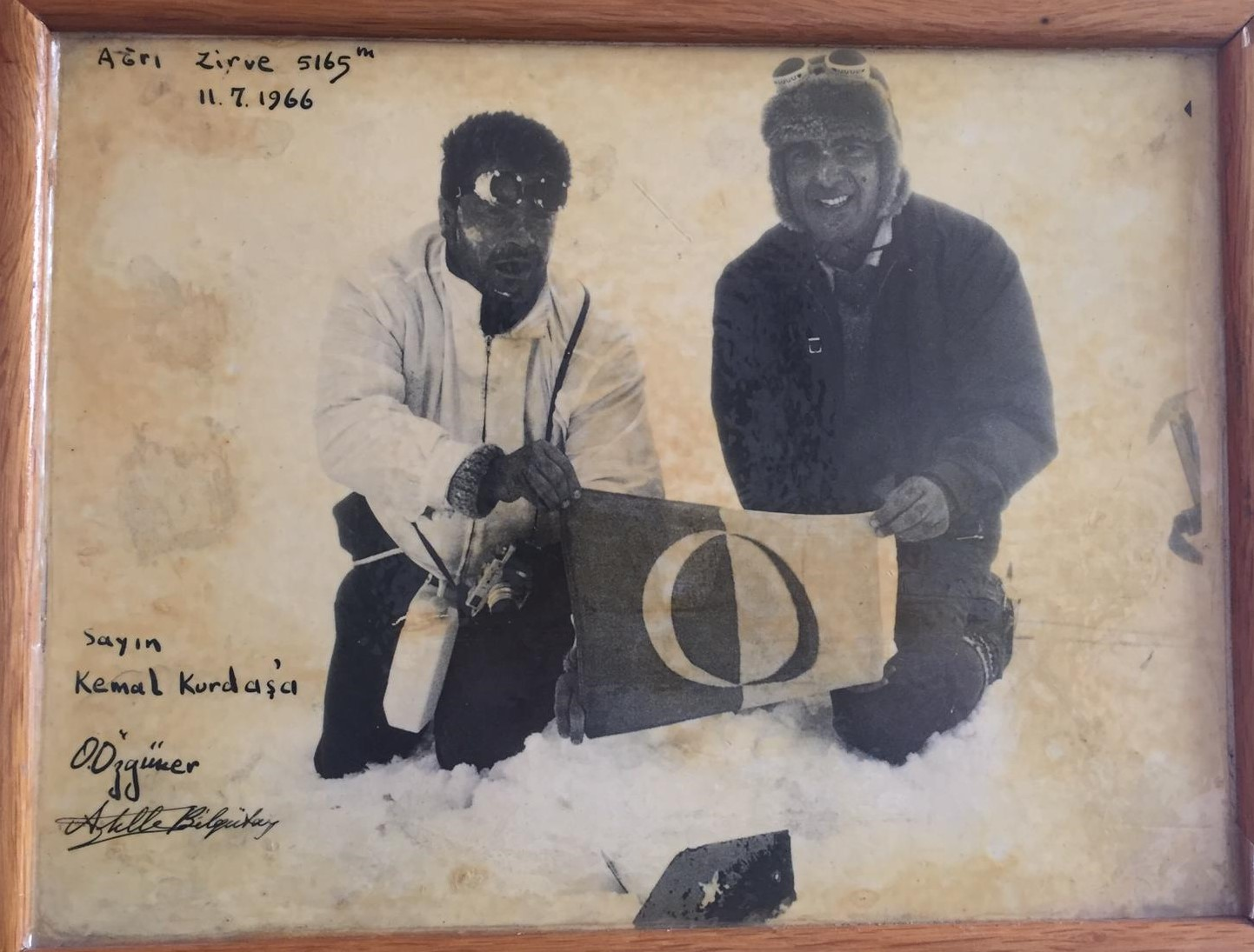
Photo of METU alumni at the summit of Mount Ağrı, taken on June 11, 1966, dedicated to METU Rector Kemal Kurdaş

Following the devastating Marmara earthquake on August 17, 1999, which resulted in approximately 18,000 fatalities, METU established a crisis management center and initiated the METU Earthquake Relief Campaign. During this campaign, METU dormitories were opened to those affected by the disaster, and the METU Earthquake Scholarship campaign was launched to support students at primary, secondary, and university levels.

In early 2000, METU, along with leading Turkish universities including Bilkent, Boğaziçi, Hacettepe, İTÜ, Koç and Sabancı, formed the Anatolian University Libraries Consortium to enhance the global information network access for Turkish academics and students and to support education and research through library resources. At the same time, an inventory of all software/hardware/embedded systems owned by the METU Computer Center was compiled, and compatibility studies for the year 2000 were conducted. On August 7, 2000, following the end of Süha Sevük's term, elections led to the appointment of Prof. Dr. Ural Akbulut, a faculty member from the Department of Chemistry, as rector.

In 2001, the State Planning Organization approved the Faculty Development Project, providing 14 million Turkish Lira in funding. That same year, the Technology Development Zones Law was passed by the Grand National Assembly, establishing METU Teknokent as Turkey's first technology park. In June 2002, METU, together with Ankara University, İTÜ, Boğaziçi University and Bilkent University, formed the Inter-University European Union Initiative to collaborate on EU projects. This initiative organized 12 workshops under the 7 main themes of the 6th Framework Programs and started efforts to create national networks across the country. METU became the first European university to achieve equivalence under the new criteria of the American accreditation body ABET, accrediting all its engineering programs in Turkey, and by 2003, it was one of only two universities in Turkey with fully accredited engineering programs.

The establishment laws for the Northern Cyprus Campus were passed by the Assembly of the Republic of the Turkish Republic of Northern Cyprus in 2003, granting it legal entity status and marking the beginning of its educational activities. On December 8, 2004, the Central Laboratory was inaugurated as the Education, Measurement, Molecular Biology, and Biotechnology R&D Centers. In 2005, 5 million Turkish Lira was allocated for projects under the Expanded National and International Projects (ENIP) scheme, and significant progress was made in Unmanned Aerial Vehicle, Smart Glass, and Raw Material for Rental Medicines ENIP projects, reaching the product and patent stages. The METU Science and Technology Museum also opened its doors in 2005.

== Organisation ==
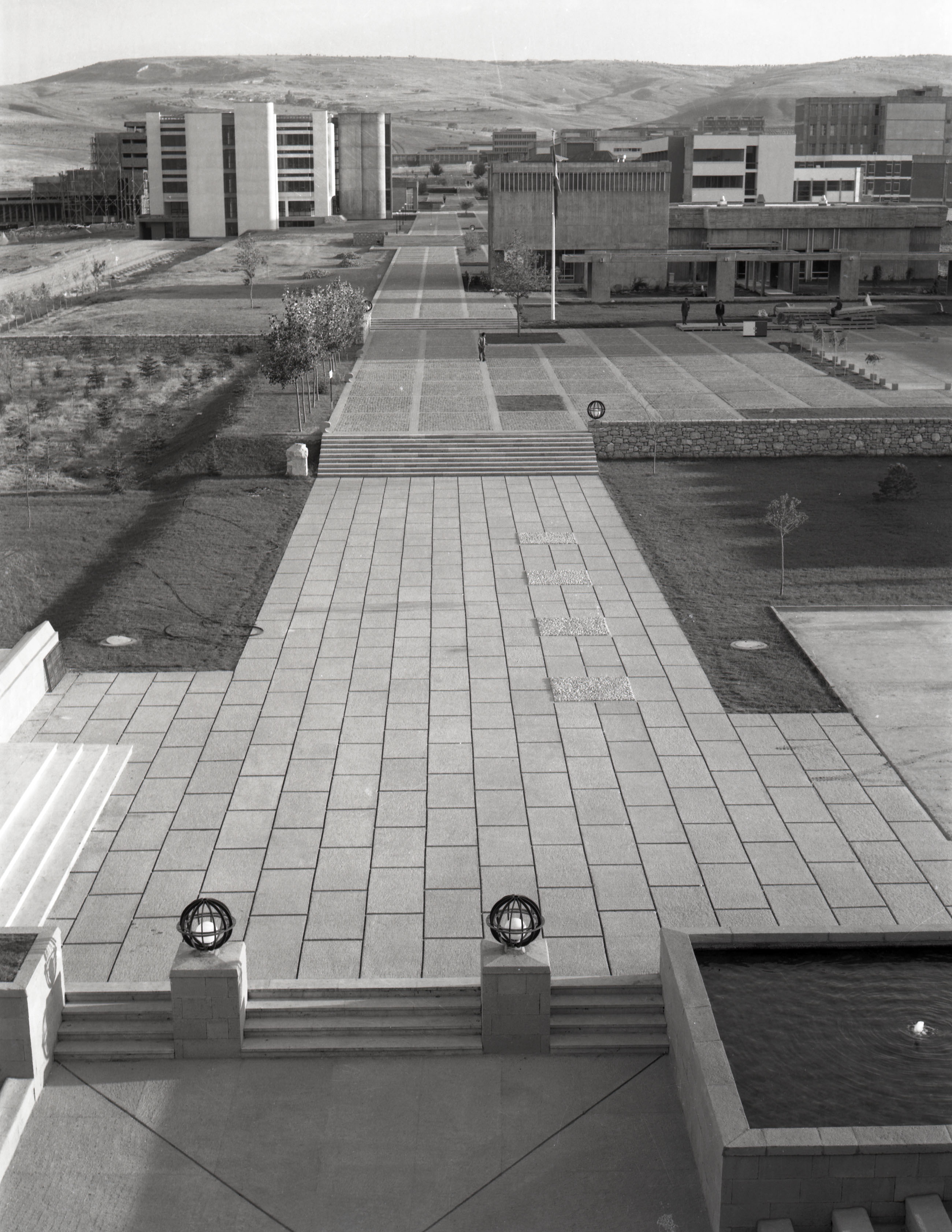
METU campus is an example of brutalist architecture designed by Behruz Çinici.

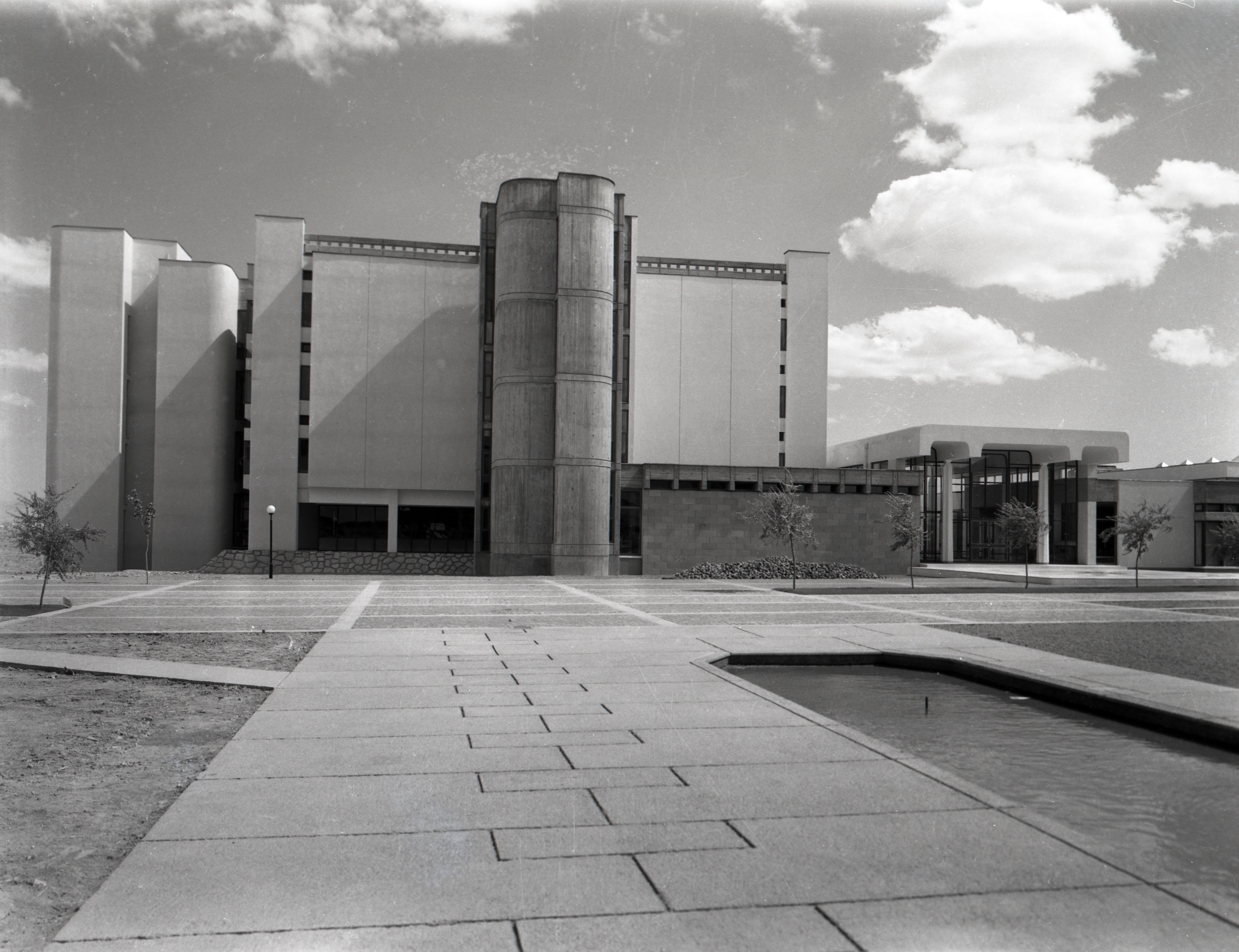
METU Library, 1961-1980

=== Faculties and departments ===
METU has 42 academic departments, most of which are organised into 5 faculties. These are responsible for the undergraduate programs.

- Faculty of Architecture: Architecture, City and Regional Planning, Industrial Design
- Faculty of Arts and Sciences: Biology, Chemistry, History, Mathematics, Molecular Biology and Genetics, Philosophy, Physics, Psychology, Sociology, Statistics
- Faculty of Economic and Administrative Sciences: Business Administration, Economics, International Relations, Political Science and Public Administration
- Faculty of Education: Computer Education and Instructional Technology, Educational Sciences, Elementary Education, Foreign Language Education, Physical Education and Sports, Secondary Science and Mathematics Education
- Faculty of Engineering: Aerospace Engineering, Chemical Engineering, Civil Engineering, Computer Engineering, Electrical and Electronics Engineering, Engineering Sciences, Environmental Engineering, Food Engineering, Geological Engineering, Industrial Engineering, Mechanical Engineering, Metallurgical and Materials Engineering, Mining Engineering, Petroleum and Natural Gas Engineering

In addition to these, there are the Department of Basic English and the Department of Modern Languages in the School of Foreign Languages; the Technical Vocational School of Higher Education; and, bound directly to the President's Office, the Department of Turkish Language and the Department of Music and Fine Arts.

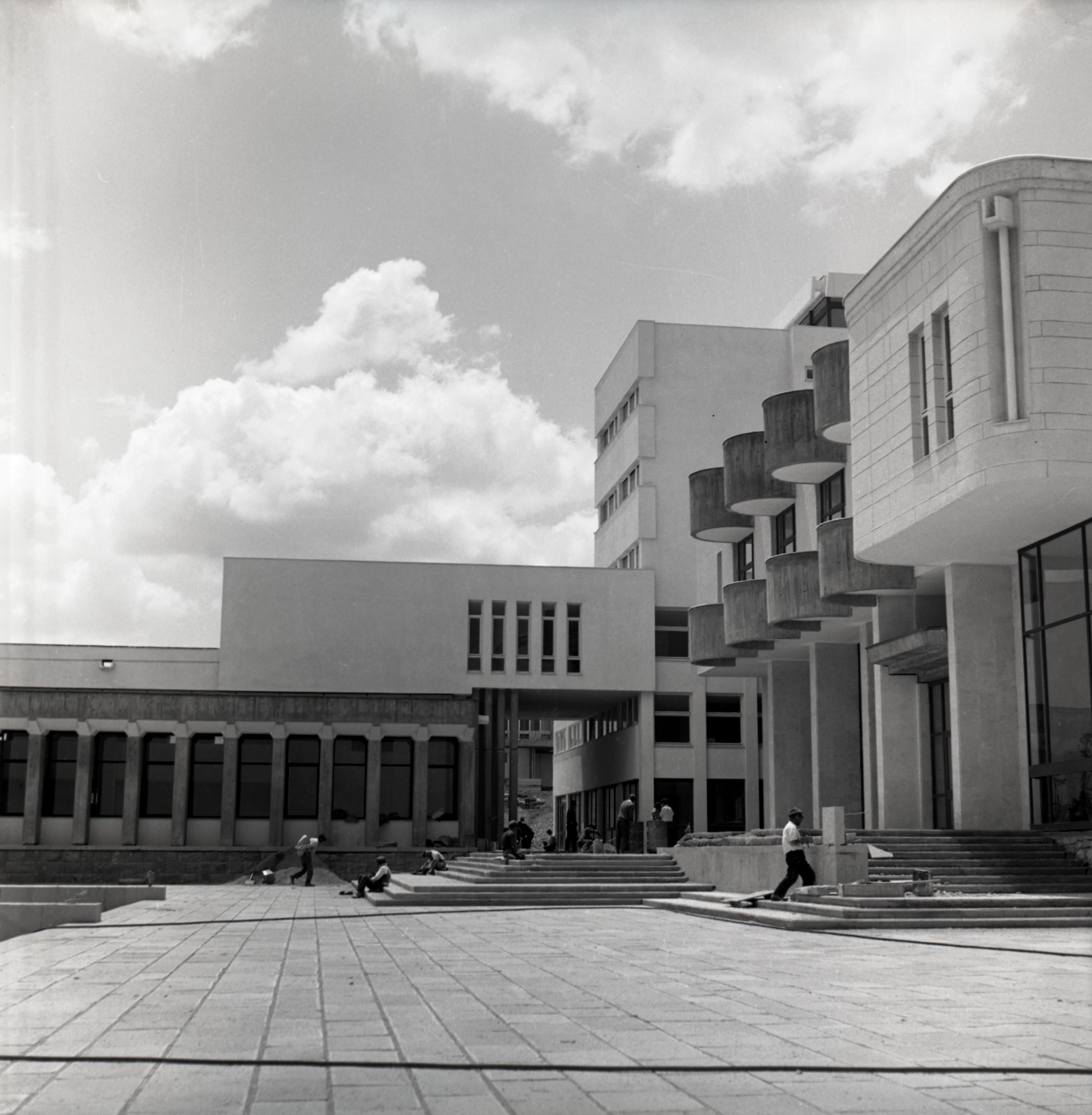
METU Rectorate Building

=== Graduate schools ===
The 5 graduate schools present in METU are responsible for the graduate programs.

- Graduate School of Applied Mathematics
- Graduate School of Informatics
- Graduate School of Marine Sciences (Institute of Marine Sciences – IMS)
- Graduate School of Natural and Applied Sciences
- Graduate School of Social Sciences

== Academics ==
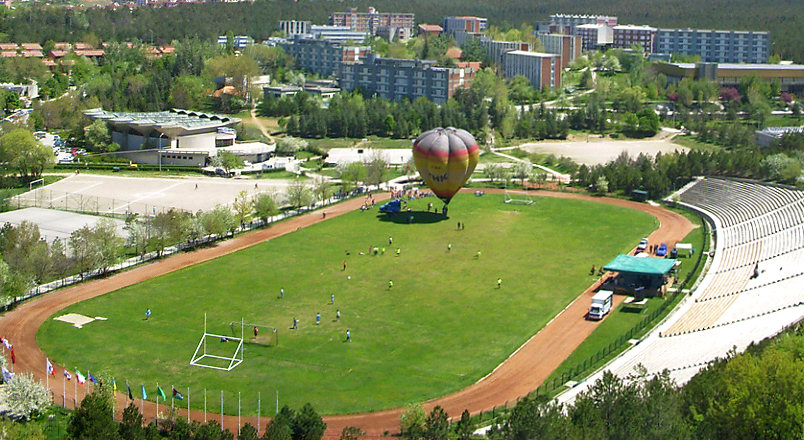
A section of the METU campus, featuring the METU Stadium, commonly known as the Revolution (Turkish: Devrim), a portion of dormitories in the background

As of 2020, METU has approximately 27,000 students, of which 19,700 are enrolled in undergraduate programs, 4,700 in masters, and 3,000 in doctorate programs. A further 1,500 students are attending programs in the new Northern Cyprus Campus. Over 40% of METU's students go on to graduate school. Each academic year, METU hosts over 1,700 regular international students from 94 different countries; and through 168 Erasmus Programme agreements and 182 bilateral exchange and cooperation agreements with universities abroad (e.g. in Central Asia, Middle East, North America, Australia, Far East and Pacific Region), it sends 350 students and receives 300 students and 50 researchers annually. As of 2023, the university employs 2,603 faculty (professors and associate professors), 479 academic instructors, and over 708 research assistants. The number of the alumni exceeds 500,000 (about 350,000 having completed undergraduate programs).

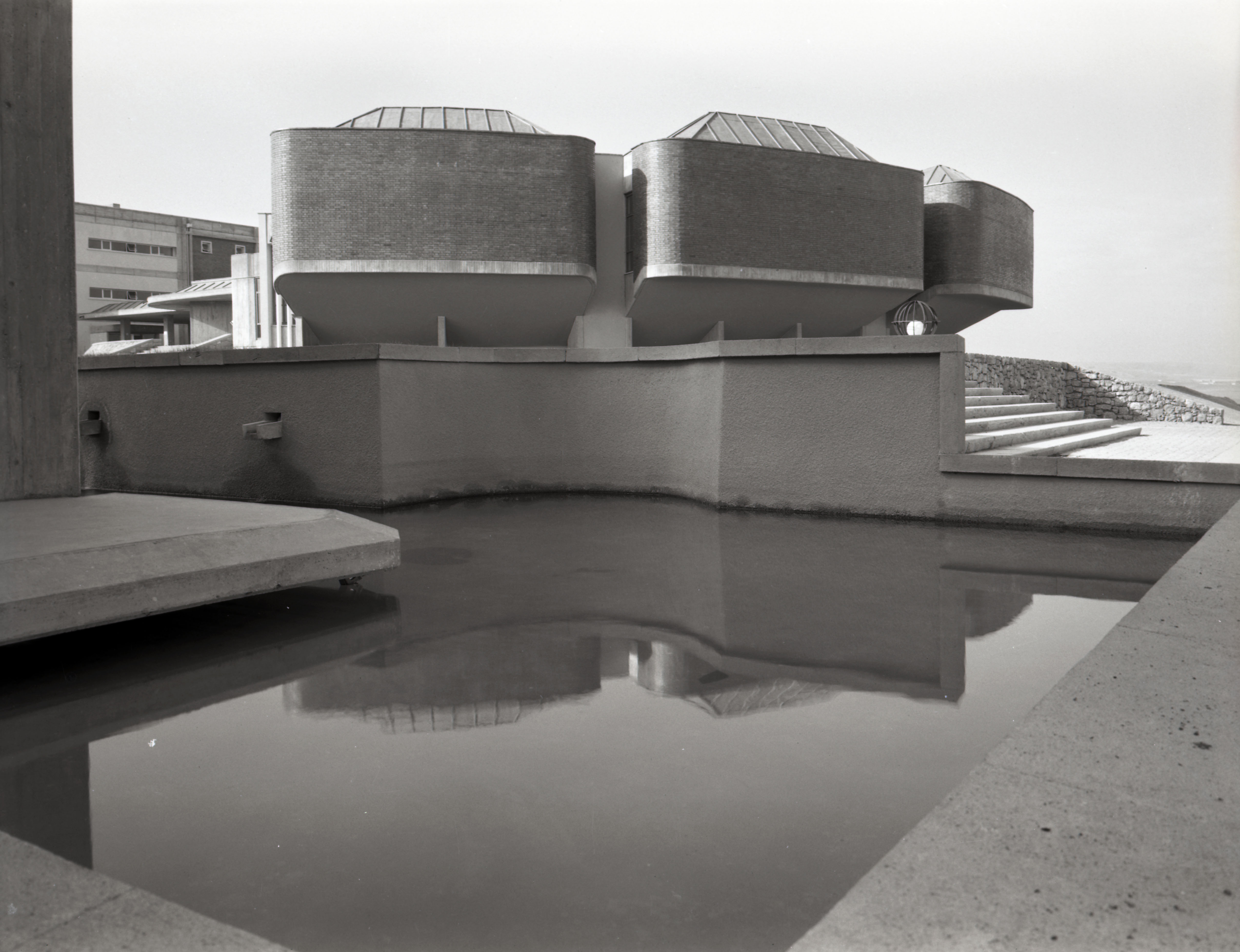
Three-part lecture hall, rear view, 1961–1980, SALT Research

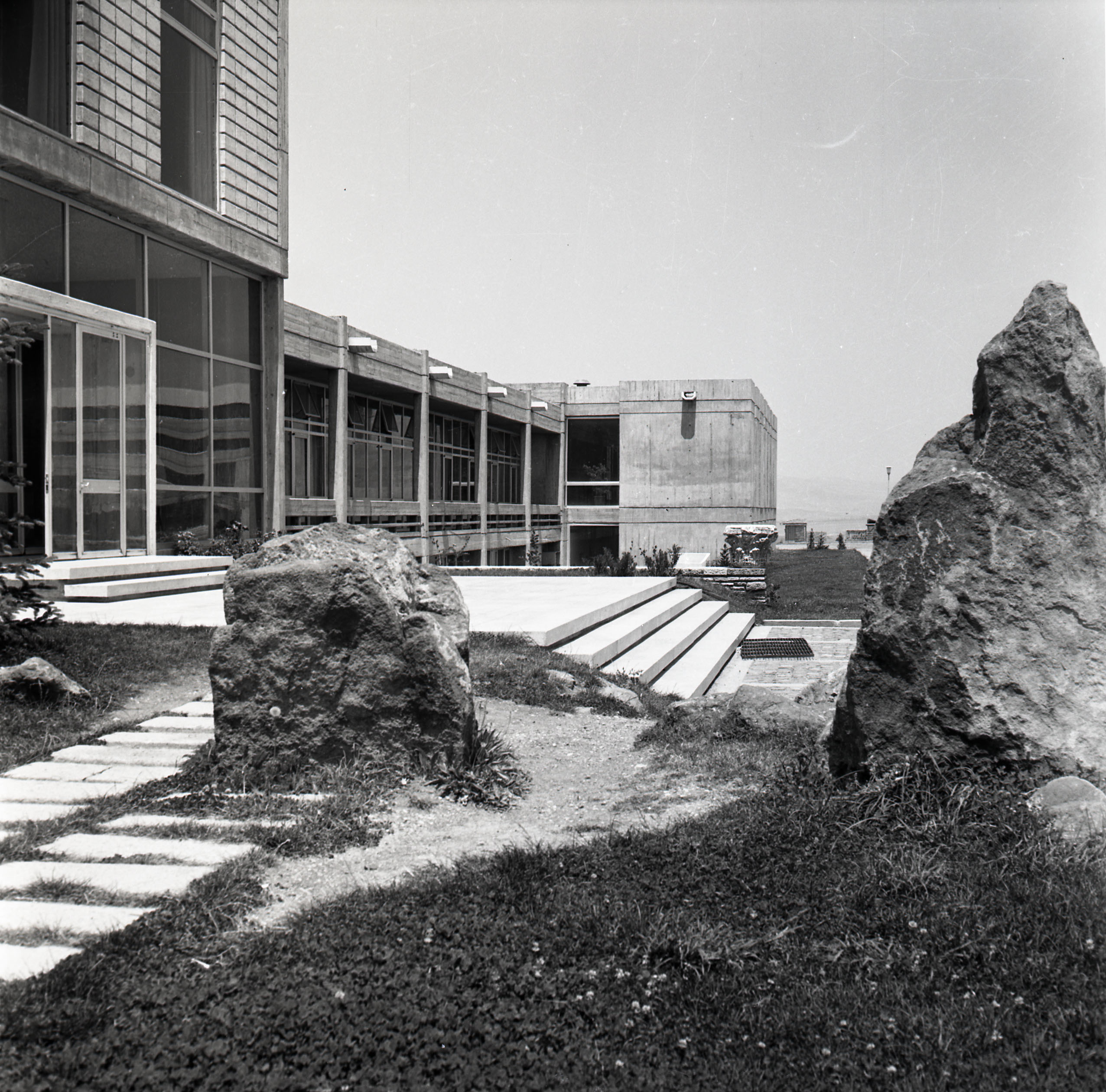
METU Faculty of Architecture was the first building of the campus.

METU has about 40 undergraduate programs within the faculties of Engineering, Architecture, Arts and Sciences, Economic and Administrative Sciences, and Education, and there are 97 masters and 62 doctorate programs available in the graduate schools of Natural and Applied Sciences, Social Sciences, Informatics, Applied Mathematics, and Marine Sciences. METU commonly ranks close to the top among research universities in Turkey, with over one third of the 1,000 highest scoring students in the national university entrance examination choosing to enroll; and most of its departments accepting the top 0.1% of the nearly 1.5 million applicants. In the Webometrics Ranking of World Universities published in July 2009, aiming to measure through web-based publications the institution size, research output, and impact, METU ranked as the world's 435th (1st place within Turkey) among 15,000 universities, being the only university from Turkey to get included among the top 500. Recently, the Times Higher Education World University Rankings published in September 2016 placed METU at the 501–600th position worldwide based on indicators of teaching, research, influence, innovation, and international character, making it one of the six universities from Turkey listed among the top 600 (the other being Bilkent University at number 351–400). The QS World University Rankings 2010 by Quacquarelli Symonds ranked METU as 185th worldwide in the field of engineering and technology, and as 333rd in the field of natural sciences.

The language of instruction at METU is English. All enrolled students are required to have a degree of proficiency in English for academic purposes, and this is assured by a proficiency examination before the commence of studies. Students with unsatisfactory knowledge of English follow a preparatory English education for one year, given by the METU School of Foreign Languages. Two exceptions instructed in Turkish are the Turkish language and the history of Turkish revolution courses mandated by the Council of Higher Education.

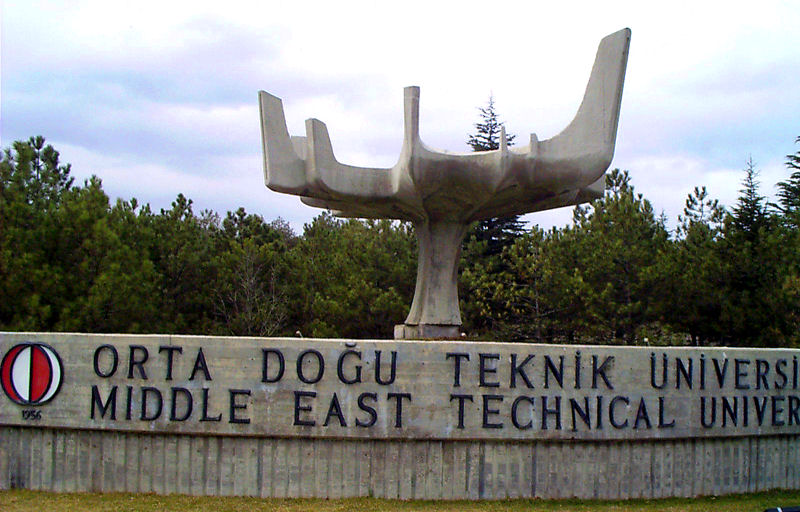
Tree of Science statue (Turkish: Bilim Ağacı) by the main entrance to METU campus

=== International perspective ===
University rankings
| | 2014 | 2015 | 2016 | 2017 | 2018 | 2019 | 2020 | 2021 | 2022 | 2023 | 2024 | 2025 | 2026 | 2027 |
|---|---|---|---|---|---|---|---|---|---|---|---|---|---|---|
| Times Higher Education World Ranking | 201–225 | 85 | 501–600 | 601–800 | 601–800 | 601–800 | 601–800 | 801–1000 | 601–800 | 501–600 | 351-400 | 351-400 | 351-400 | 326-350 |
| THE Reputation | 71–80 | N/A | N/A | N/A | N/A | N/A | N/A | N/A | N/A | N/A | Not published | 201-300 | Not yet published | Not yet published |
| THE Arts & Humanities (History & Philosophy) | N/A | N/A | N/A | N/A | 301-400 | 401+ | 301-400 | 301-400 | 301-400 | 251-300 | 251-300 | 201-250 | 201-250 | Not yet published |
| QS World University Rankings Overall | 431–440 | 401–410 | 431–440 | 471–480 | 471–480 | 551–560 | 591–600 | 601–650 | 551–560 | 501–510 | 336 | 285 | 269 | 305 |
| QS World University Rankings Engineering | 118 | 184 | 184 | 259 | 216 | 243 | 193 | 183 | 142 | 133 | 117 | 104 | 103 | Not yet published |
| QS World University Rankings Arts & Humanities (History & Philosophy) | N/A | N/A | N/A | 451-500 | 451-500 | N/A | 401-450 | 400 | 401-450 | 364 | 240 | 229 | 242 | Not yet published |
| ARWU World Ranking | N/A | N/A | N/A | 701–800 | 801–900 | 701–800 | 801–900 | 901–1000 | 901–1000 | N/A | N/A | N/A | 901–1000 | Not yet published |
| CWTS Leiden World Ranking | 570 | 596 | 501 | 540 | 565 | 598 | 585 | 600 | 654 | 697 | 755 | 797 | Not yet published | Not yet published |
| CWUR World Ranking | 396 | 470 | 525 | 498 | 596 | 582 | 571 | 573 | 595 | 627 | 685 | 709 | 736 | Not yet published |

Researchers from METU actively take part in many COST, EUREKA, NASA, NATO, NSF, UN, World Bank, Jean Monnet, Erasmus Mundus, Leonardo and SOCRATES projects. METU has been involved in 56 European Union 6th Framework Programme (FP6) projects, including the coordination of 12 FP6 and 3 Networks of Excellence projects. Within the 7th Framework Programme (FP7), 33 research projects involve participation of METU, since 2007.

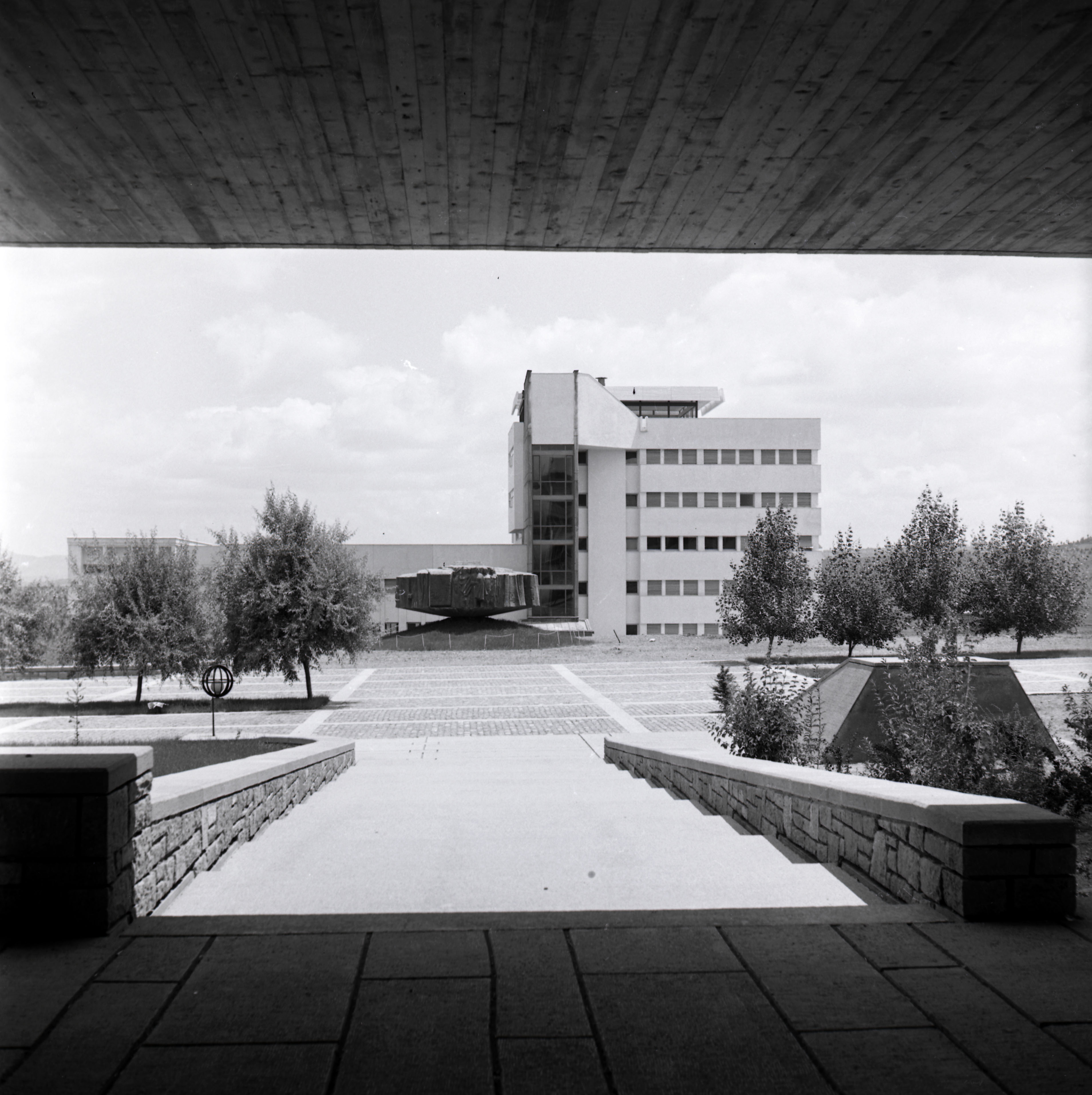
METU main road view from Physics Department

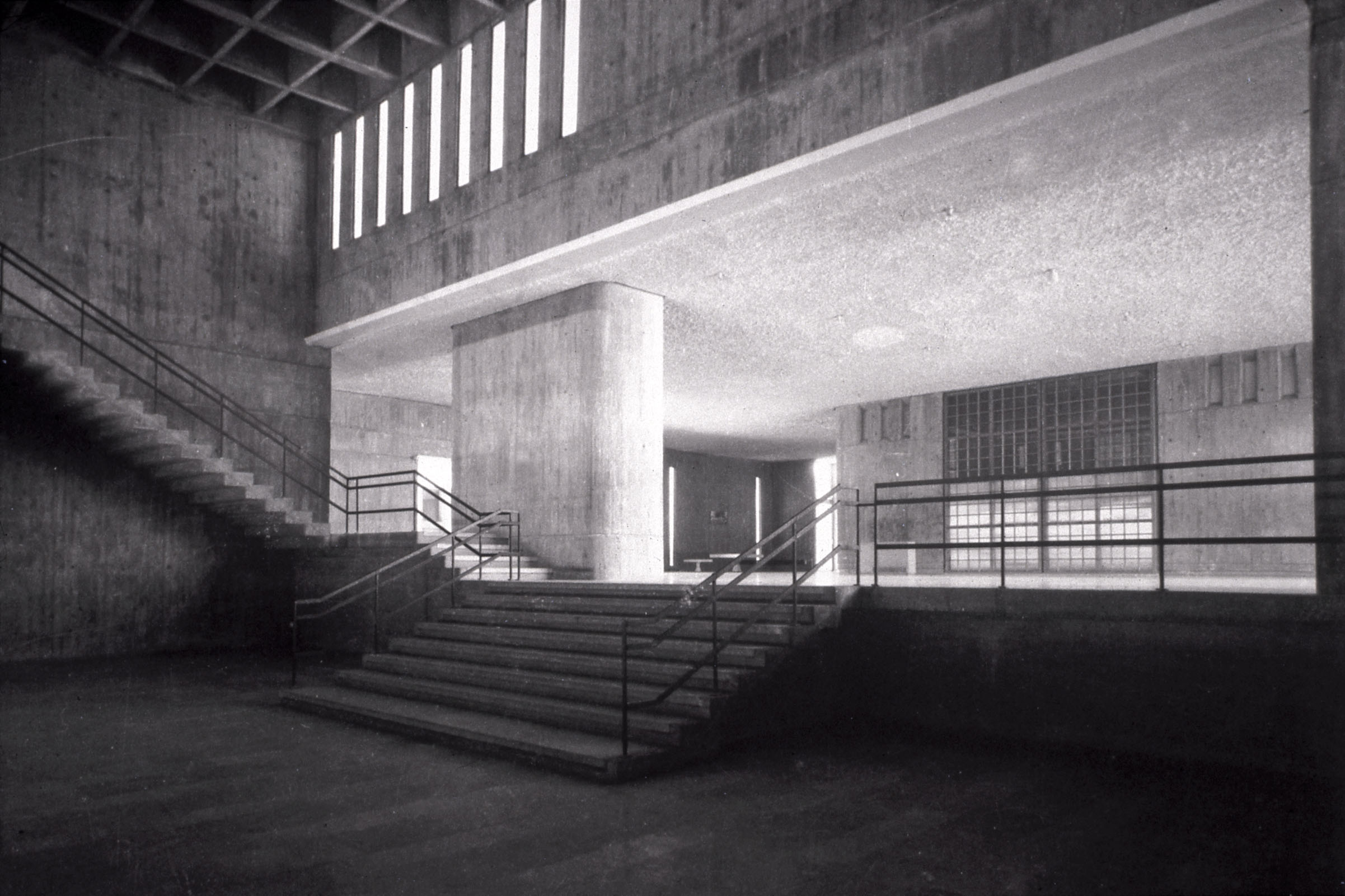
METU Interior of Faculty of Architecture

As of 2020, METU has 22 international joint degree programmes with European and American universities at the undergraduate and graduate levels. METU is a member of various associations and networks dealing with international education and exchange, including EUA, EAIE, IIE, GE3, SEFI, and CIEE. The university also actively participates in AIESEC and IAESTE summer internship programs. English as the language of instruction in all its degree programs has greatly facilitated METU's international involvements and accommodation of international students and researchers.

METU continually goes through external assessment, accreditation, and certification by international organizations. In 1991, METU initiated a long-term program to have its engineering programs evaluated by the Accreditation Board for Engineering and Technology (ABET), the recognized U.S. accreditor of college and university programs in applied science, computing, engineering, and technology. This process was concluded with the Faculty of Engineering having all its thirteen undergraduate programs declared as "substantially equivalent" to the ABET accredited programs in the USA. The university has completed the evaluation process of Institutional Evaluation Programme (IEP) of the European University Association (EUA) in 2002.

Because of METU's effort to maintain international standards, the Faculty of Engineering was awarded in 1977 the "Silver Badge of Honor" by the UNESCO International Center for Engineering Education and the "Meritorious Achievement Award in Accreditation Activities" by the Institute of Electrical and Electronics Engineers (IEEE). METU was awarded the international Aga Khan Award for Architecture in 1995 for its forestation program.

Being the pioneer institution of the country to connect to the Internet backbone in the early 1990s, METU also manages Turkey's Country Code Top-level Domain (ccTLD) (the ".tr" domain).

In the THE World Reputation Rankings, METU placed in the 91–100 band in 2012, 51–60 in 2013, and 71–80 in 2014.

=== METU library ===
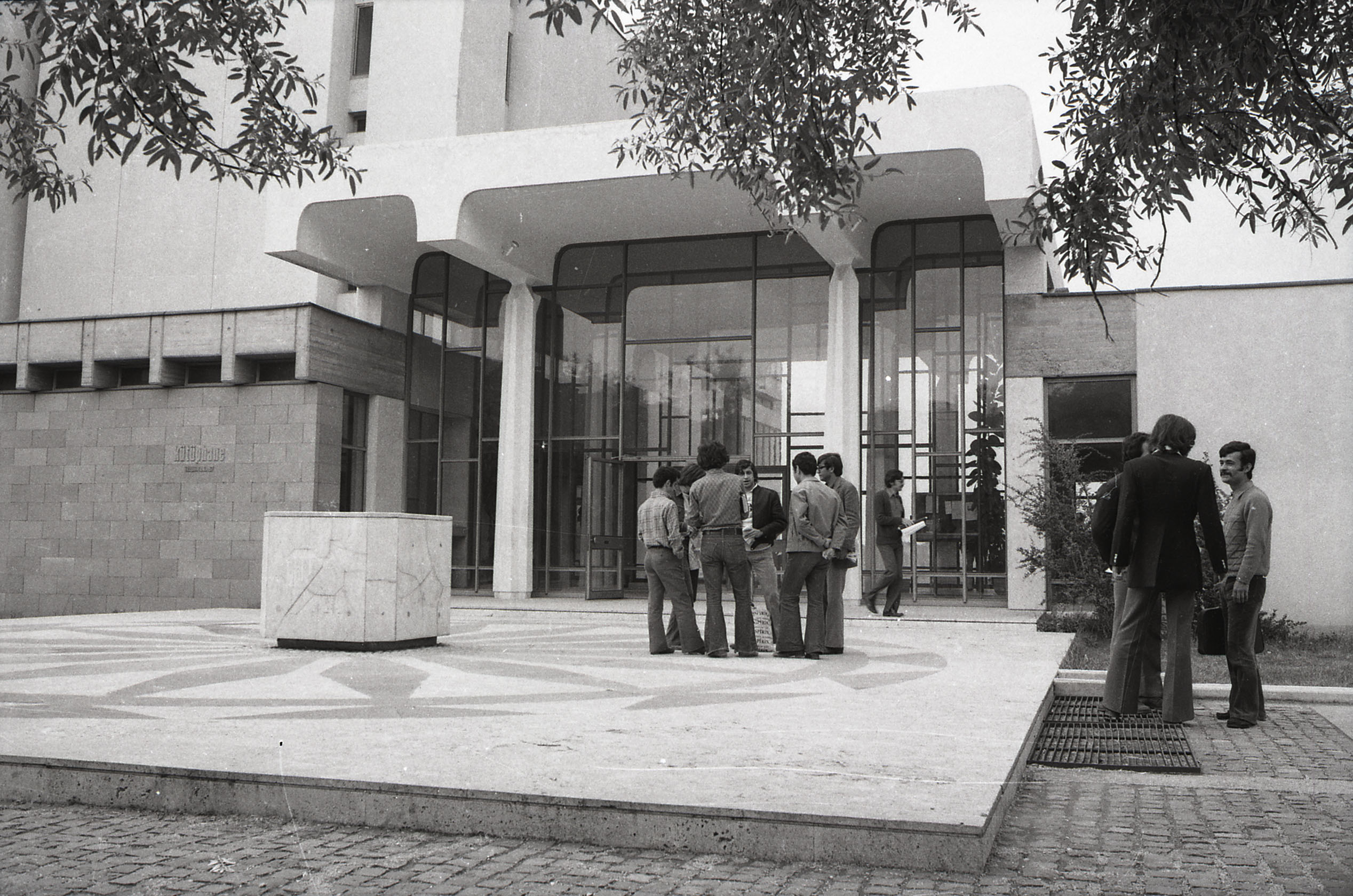
METU Library Building, 1961-1980

The METU Main Library has one of the largest collections in Turkey, containing over 500,000 books classified according to the Library of Congress Classification (LCC) scheme. The library subscribes to 1,500 print journals (170,270 volumes) and it provides access to 76,671 electronic journals, 587,493 electronic books, and 66 electronic reference sources. The library collections also hold over 1,780 book and serial CDs, 1,300 doctoral dissertations and 11,600 masters theses. Abstracts for doctoral dissertations and some master theses from North American colleges and universities and some accredited international universities are also provided, starting from 1861, with full texts available from the year 1997. The library's collections are predominantly in English, but there are also items in Turkish, German, and French. The library also has an exhibition space named after Furuzan Olşen. The exhibition space is approximately 100 m^{2} located at the entrance of the library. It hosts exhibitions, talks, and other cultural events, and is open to visitors during the library's regular opening hours.

== Campuses ==
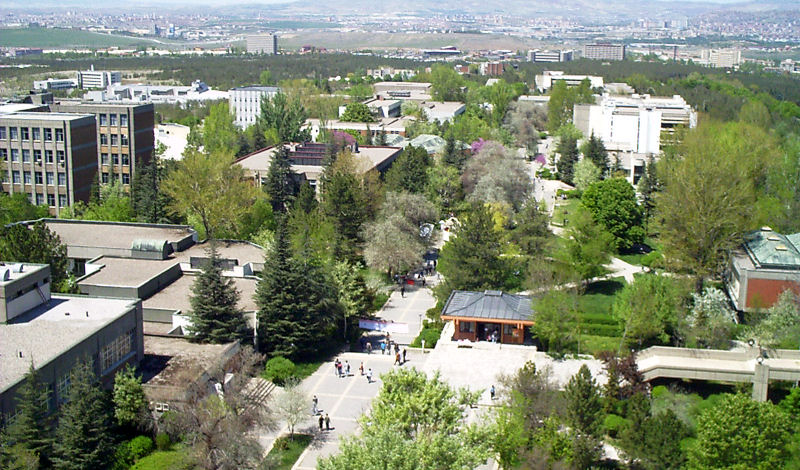
Part of METU campus, as seen from the MM Building (Turkish: Mühendislik Merkez Binası).

=== Ankara campus ===
METU main campus in Ankara, used by the university since 1963, is the first university campus of Turkey. It is situated about 10 km west of central Ankara and encompasses an area of 11,100 acres (4,500 ha), of which 7,500 acres (3,000 ha) constitute the METU Forest. The campus grounds was transformed into a forest with the continuing help of students and volunteers since the foundation of the university. The creation of this distinctive campus with its forest was spearheaded by the METU rector from 1961 to 1969, Kemal Kurdaş.

Lake Eymir near Gölbaşı, located 15 kilometers from the academic portion of the campus, is used by the students and faculty for rowing and recreational activities. The campus is accessible by several types of public transport, and the construction of METU subway station of the Ankara Metro on the main entrance to the campus (gate A1) was completed in 2014.

In 2026, the campus was added to UNESCO's World Heritage Tentative List under the title "METU Campus: A Living Modern Cultural Landscape".

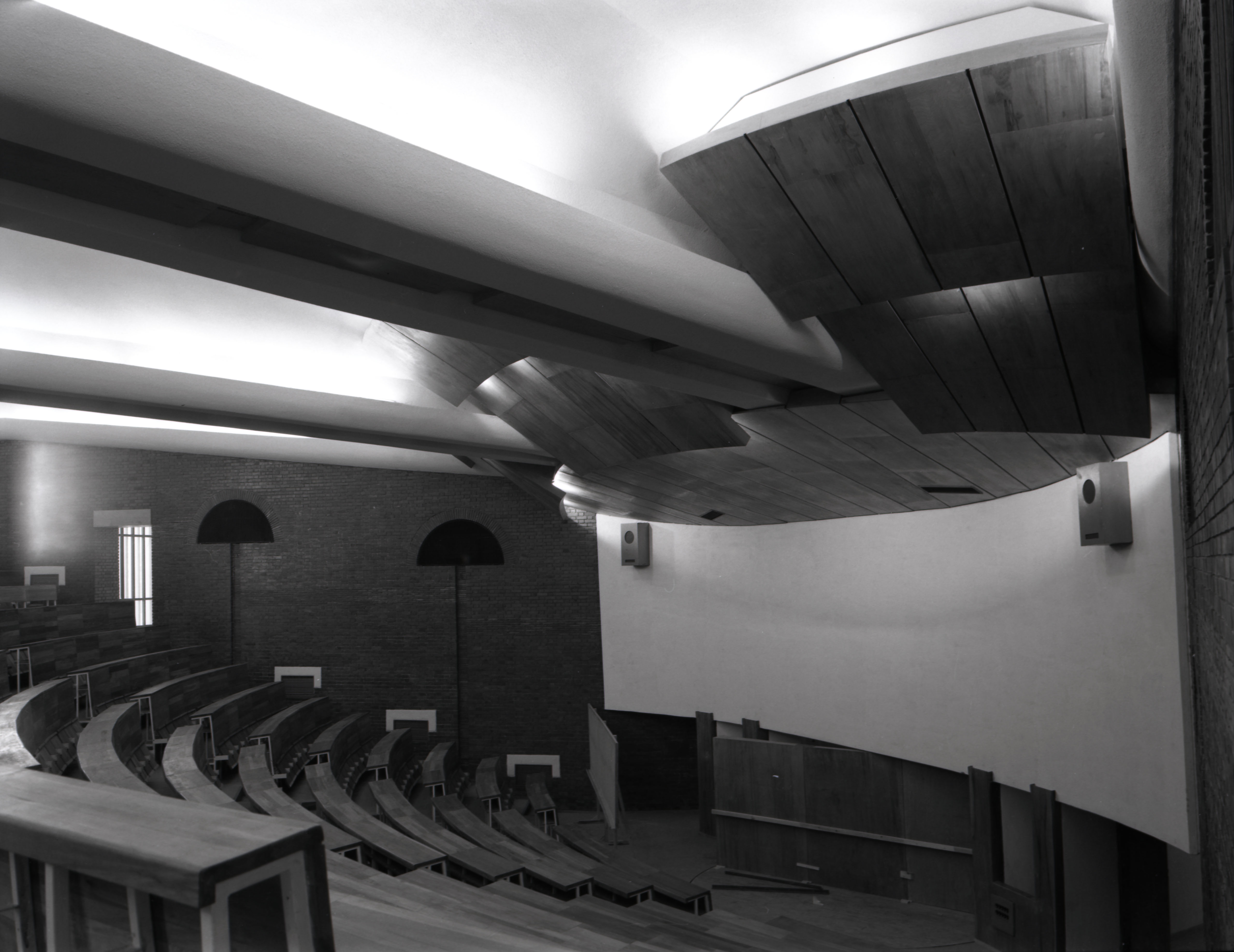
Triple Lecture Hall near the Department of Physics

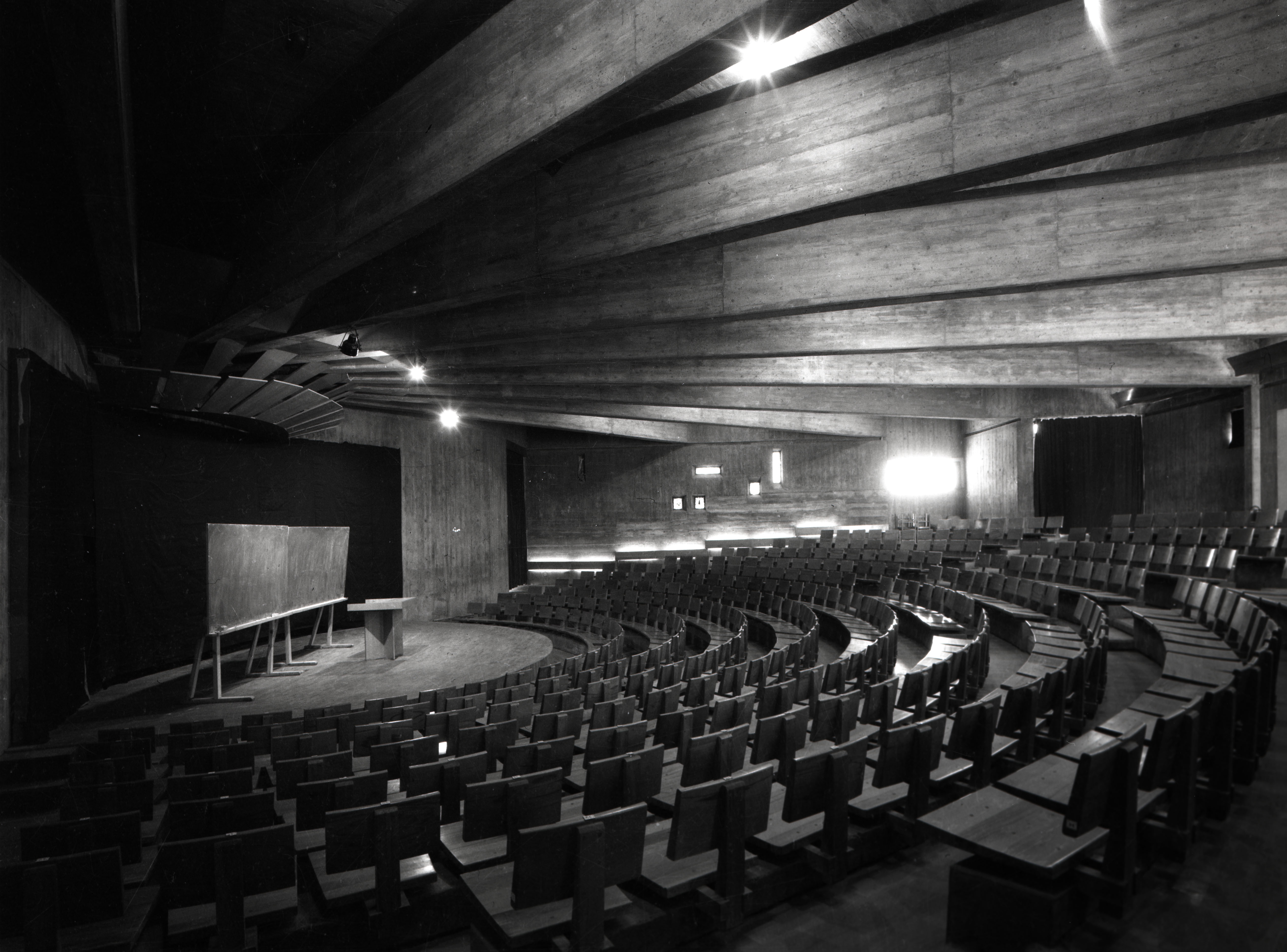
Lecture Hall in the Department of Architecture

=== Northern Cyprus campus ===
The METU Northern Cyprus Campus, the first overseas campus of a Turkish university, 50 km west of North Nicosia in Northern Cyprus, admitted its first students during the academic year 2002–2003, but the doors were officially opened in Northern Cyprus in September 2005.

=== Erdemli campus ===
The METU Erdemli campus in Mersin Province on the Mediterranean coast, used by the Middle East Technical University Institute of Marine Sciences since 1975, is the first campus of METU outside of Ankara. It is situated about 45 km from Mersin. The campus area is 660,000 m^{2}, close to the shore and surrounded by lemon trees. The laboratory space is about 700 m^{2}. METU-IMS Harbor is an important shelter for marine biological diversity on the Mersin coast. The harbor is the only intact rocky habitat along the long sandy coast.

== METU Teknokent ==
METU Teknokent, or ODTÜ Teknokent, is the first science and research park in Turkey.

As of 2009, the METU Teknokent project employs about 3,300 personnel, approximately 2,700 of whom are researchers (86% of the total staff are university graduates, and 23% have MSc, MA, or PhD degrees), working in 240 firms. Around 90% of the firms are small and medium enterprises (SMEs), 65% of these are specialized in information and communication technologies, 25% in electronics, and 15% in other sectors such as aerospace, environment, bio-technology, nanotechnology, and advanced materials.

METU Teknokent hosts partners to several European Union Sixth Framework Programme (FP6) projects, such as NICE, SINCERE, ReSIST, SmeInnov8gate and IP4INNO.

== Notable people ==
=== Faculty ===
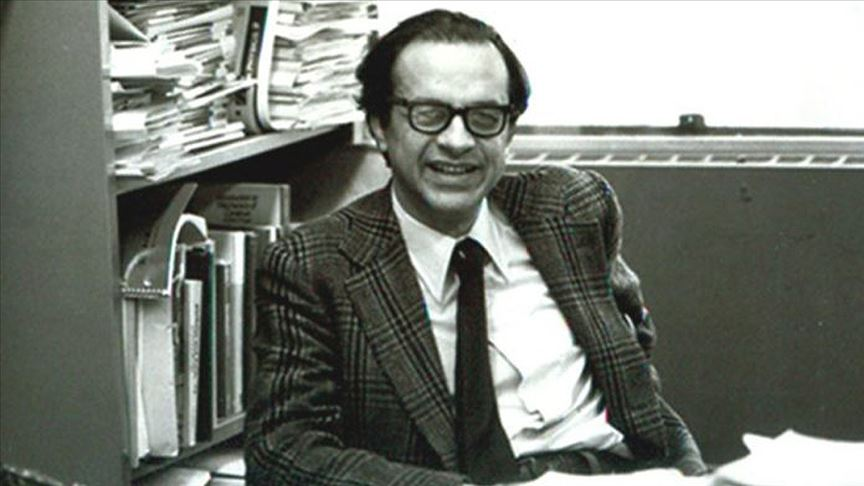
Feza Gürsey, Turkish mathematician and physicist

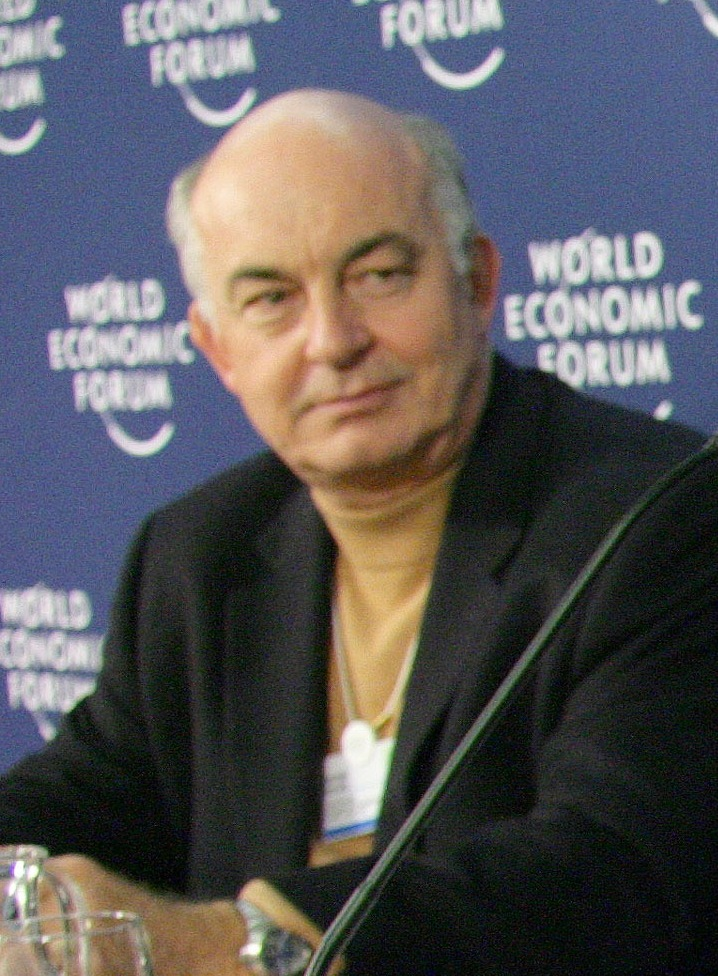
Kemal Derviş, Turkish economist and former head of the United Nations Development Programme

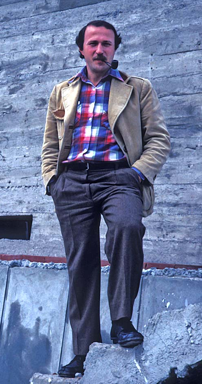
Hakkı Ögelman, Turkish astrophysicist

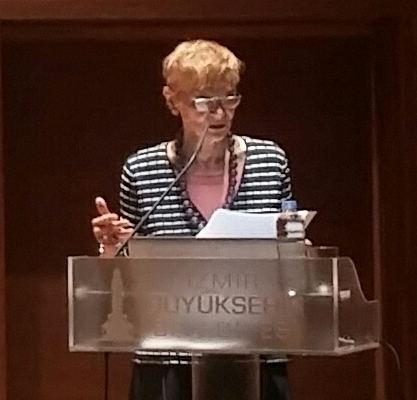
Suraiya Faroqhi, German historian

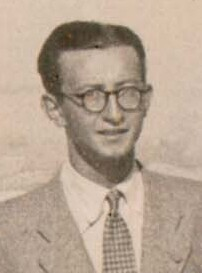
Erdal İnönü, Turkish theoretical physicist and politician

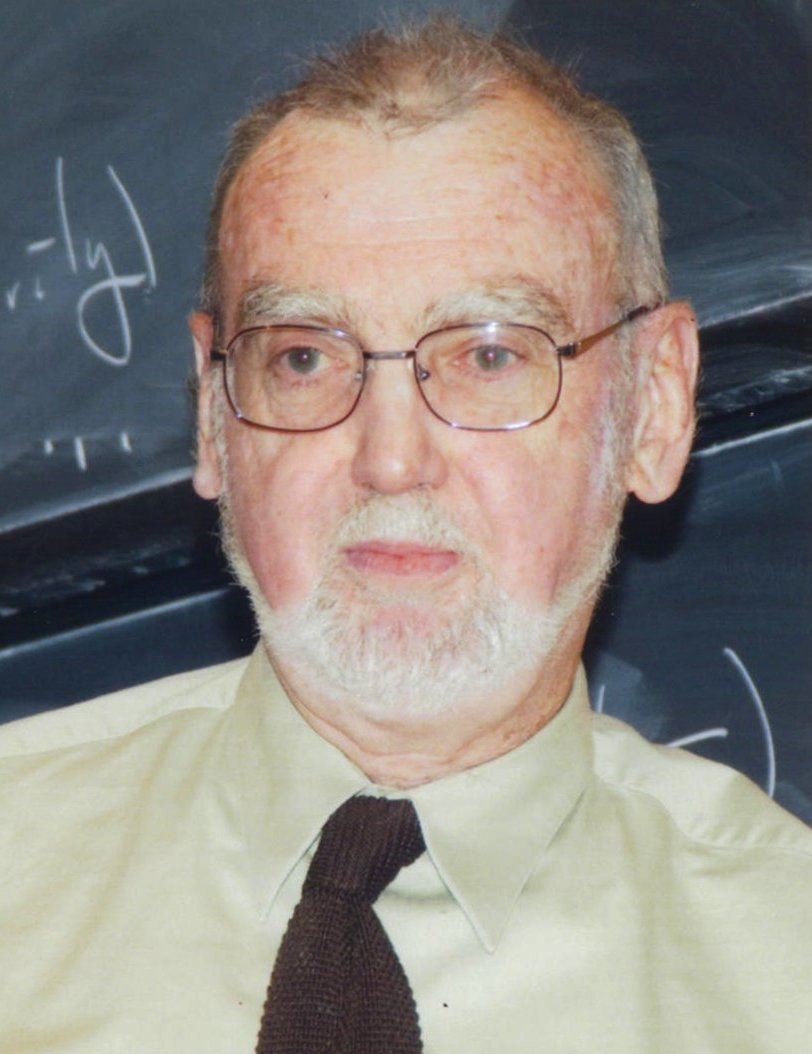
Robert Langlands, Canadian mathematician and founder of Langlands program

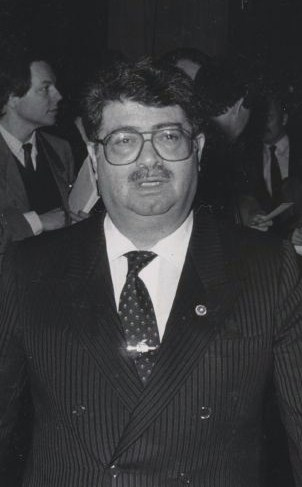
Turgut Özal, 8th President of Turkey
- Aptullah Kuran (1927–2002) – Historian of architecture, B.Sc. and M.Sc. at Yale University, Ph.D. at Ankara University. Dean of the Faculty of Architecture (1960–1968), later served as the founding rector of Boğaziçi University
- Behram Kurşunoğlu (1956–1958) – Physicist, B.Sc. and M.Sc. at University of Edinburgh and Ph.D. in University of Cambridge, best known for his works on unified field theory and participated in the discovery of two different types of neutrinos in the late 1950s
- Bilge Demirköz – Physicist, B.Sc. at MIT, Ph.D. at the University of Oxford
- Cahit Arf (1967–1980) – Known for Arf invariant, B.Sc. and M.Sc. in mathematics at École Normale Supérieure
- Charles E. Tucker Jr. – Retired United States Air Force general, executive director of the World Engagement Institute
- Çiğdem Kağıtçıbaşı (1940–2017) – Social psychologist, formerly at Boğaziçi University and Koç University
- Denis Alexander – Molecular biologist, emeritus Fellow of St. Edmund's College, Cambridge
- Dilhan Eryurt (1926–2012) – Astrophysicist, formerly worked for NASA's Goddard Institute for Space Studies and Apollo 11
- Erdal İnönü (President 1970–1971, Faculty 1964–1974) – B.Sc. in physics at Ankara University and Ph.D. at California Institute of Technology and former Interim Prime Minister of Turkey
- Ferdan Ergut – Historian, B.Sc. at METU, M.Sc. and Ph.D. at the New School for Social Research
- Feza Gürsey (1961–1974) – Theoretic physicist, B.Sc. in mathematics and physics at Istanbul University and Ph.D. at Imperial College London and receiver of Wigner Medal in 1986
- Feride Acar – Former chair of CEDAW, B.Sc. METU, M.Sc. and Ph.D. at Bryn Mawr College
- Hakkı Ögelman (1970–1990) – Physicist and astrophysicist, B.Sc. at DePauw, Ms.C. and Ph.D. at Cornell University
- Halil Berktay (1992–1997) – Historian, currently at Sabancı University
- Henry Bernstein – Sociologist, emeritus Professor at SOAS University of London
- Hikmet Çetin – Former Minister of Foreign Affairs and NATO Senior Civilian Representative in Afghanistan
- İlber Ortaylı – Historian, currently at Bilkent University and Galatasaray University
- İsenbike Togan – Historian, B.A. at Istanbul University, Ph.D. at Harvard University
- Jean Swank – Astrophysicist, B.A. at Bryn Mawr College, Ph.D. at California Institute of Technology
- Judith Liberman – Author and storyteller, M.Sc. at Sorbonne University
- Kemal Derviş (1973–1976) – Economist, B.Sc. at London School of Economics, Ph.D. at Princeton University former head of the United Nations Development Programme, former vice-president of the World Bank for the Middle East, former Deputy Prime Minister of Turkey
- Kemal Karpat (1958–1959, 1968–1971) – Historian, formerly at University of Wisconsin–Madison
- Larry Trask (1944–2004) – Linguist, B.Sc. at RPI, M.Sc. at Brandeis, B.A. at Westminster, Ph.D. at SOAS
- Masatoshi Gündüz Ikeda (1926–2003) – Mathematician, B.Sc. and Ph.D. at Osaka University
- Namık Kemal Pak (1947–2015) – Nuclear scientist, B.Sc. at Ankara University, Ph.D. at University of California, Berkeley
- Nur Yalman – Social anthropologist, B.A. and Ph.D. at Cambridge, emeritus at Harvard, currently chairman of Koç University
- Oktay Sinanoğlu (1935–2015) – Physical chemistry, molecular biophysics and biochemistry, B.Sc. and Ph.D. at University of California, Berkeley, M.Sc. at Massachusetts Institute of Technology, Humboldt Prize winner in 1973
- Ordal Demokan (1946–2004) – Physicist, electrical engineer, Ph.D. at University of Iowa
- Onur Yıldırım – Historian, B.A. in history at METU, Ph.D. at Princeton University
- Robert Langlands (1967–1968) – Mathematician, B.Sc. at University of British Columbia and Ph.D. at Yale University
- Sabine Strasser – Social anthropologist, B.Sc. and Ph.D. at University of Vienna
- Suraiya Faroqhi – Historian, Ph.D. at University of Hamburg, fellow of the British Academy
- Tarik Ogurtani – Experimental and theoretical solid-state physicist, materials scientist. Professor Emeritus of Materials and Metallurgical Engineering at METU
- Şerif Mardin (1927–2017) – Sociologist, political scientist, B.Sc. at Stanford University, M.Sc. at Johns Hopkins University, Ph.D. at Princeton University
- Teo Grünberg – Philosopher, B.Sc. and Ph.D. at Istanbul University
- Tekin Dereli – Theoretical physicist, currently at Koç University
- Tuncer Ören – Emeritus of Computer Science at the School of Electrical Engineering and Computer Science
- Turhan Feyzioğlu (President 1960–1961) – Constitutional law scholar and served as first Turkish rector of METU
- Turhan Nejat Veziroğlu – Mechanical engineer, formerly professor emeritus at the University of Miami
- Ulus Baker (1960–2007) – Sociologist, Gilles Deleuze and Baruch Spinoza scholar
- Walter J. D. Annand – Aeronautical research engineer, formerly at the University of Manchester
- Yakin Ertürk – Former United Nations special rapporteur and board member of UNRISD
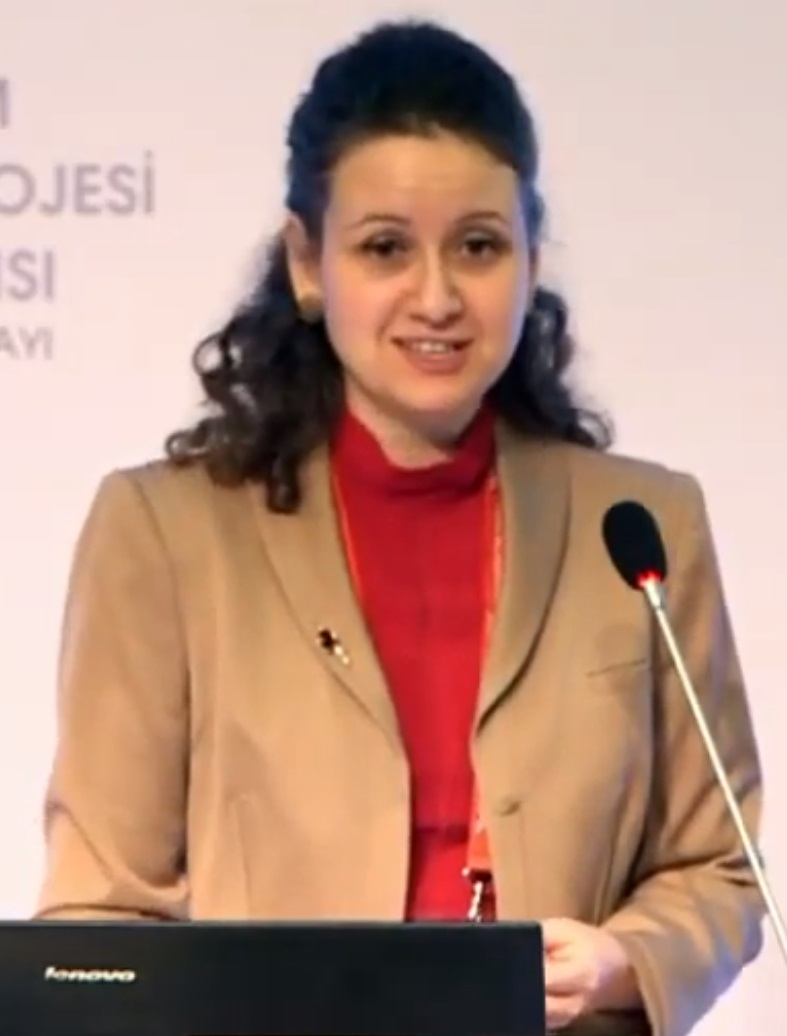
Bilge Demirköz, Turkish physicist

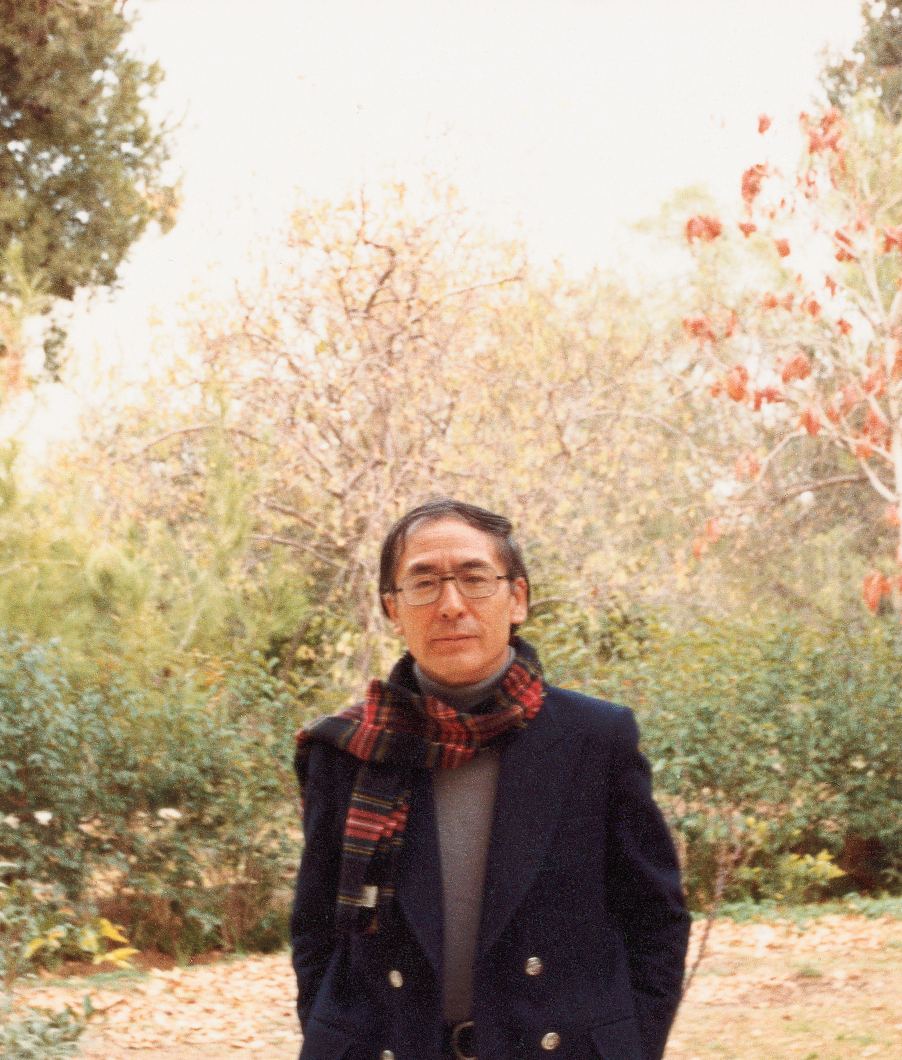
Masatoshi Gündüz Ikeda, Japanese-Turkish mathematician

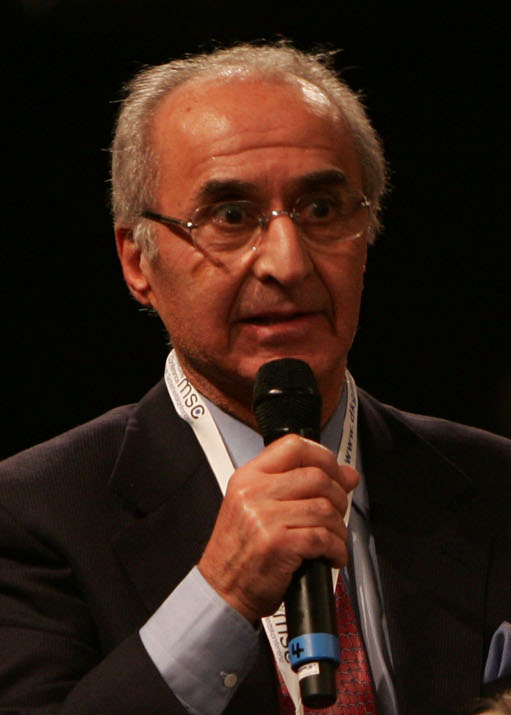
Hikmet Çetin, Former Minister of Foreign Affairs and NATO Senior Civilian Representative in Afghanistan

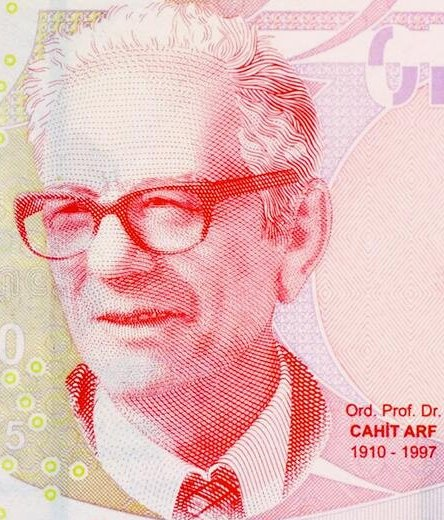
Cahit Arf, Turkish mathematician known for the Arf invariant

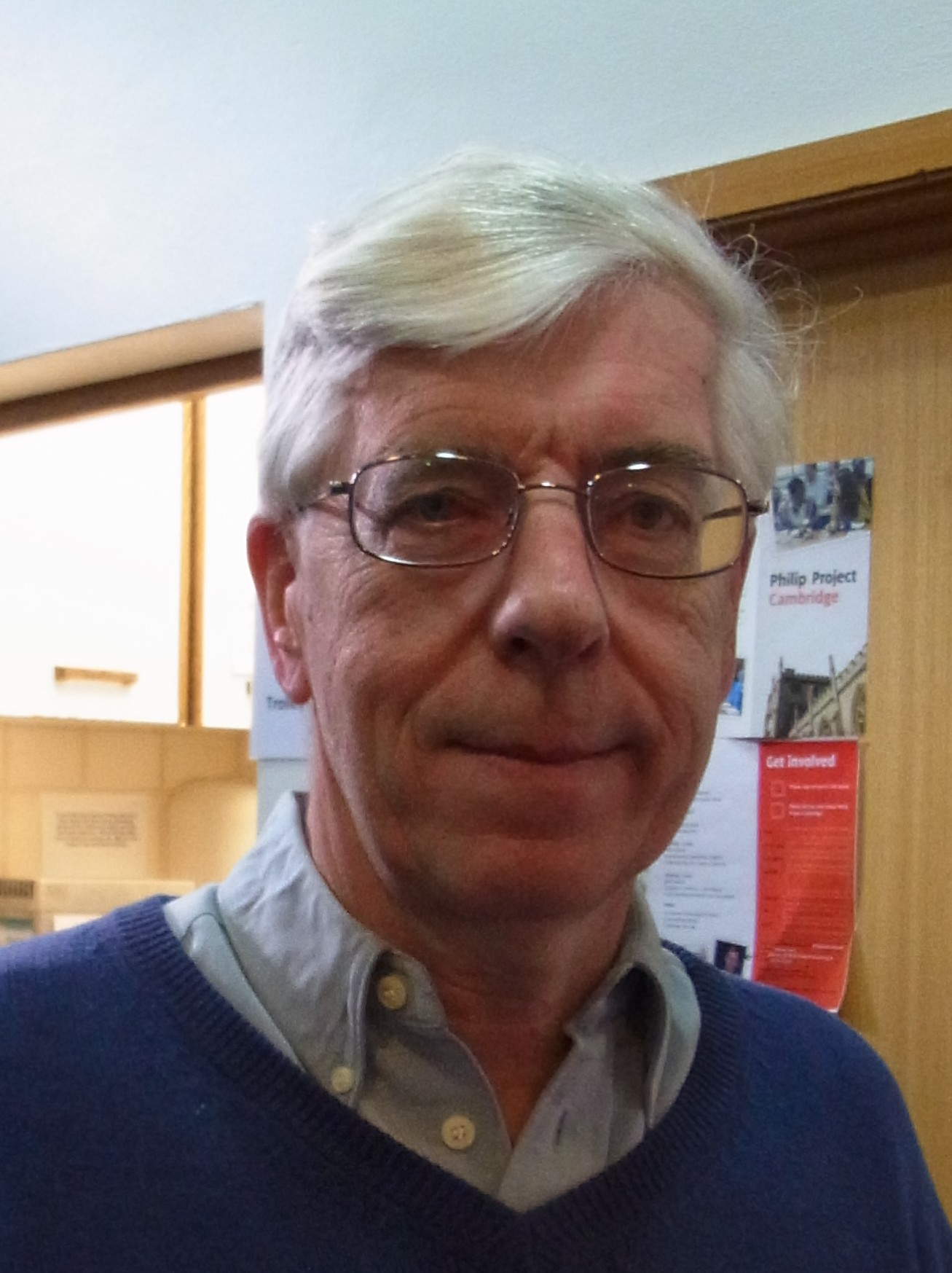
Denis Alexander, British molecular biologist and emeritus Fellow of St. Edmund's College, Cambridge

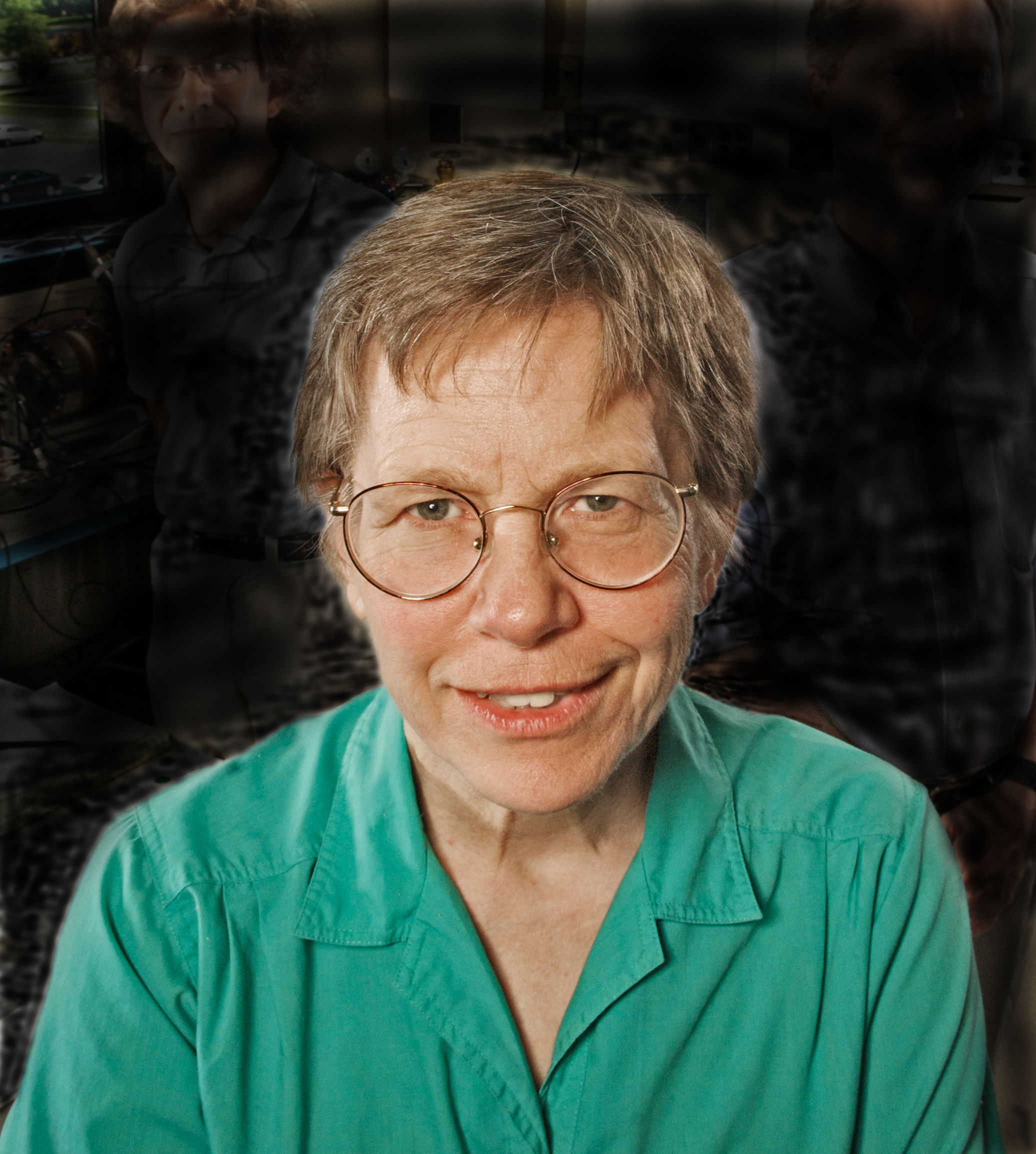
Jean Swank, American astronomer

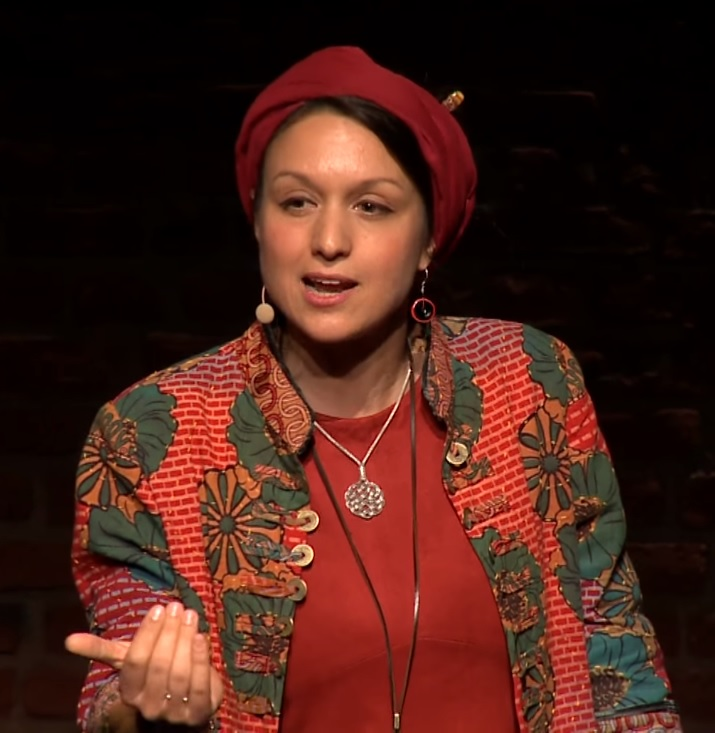
Judith Liberman, French storyteller and writer

=== Alumni ===
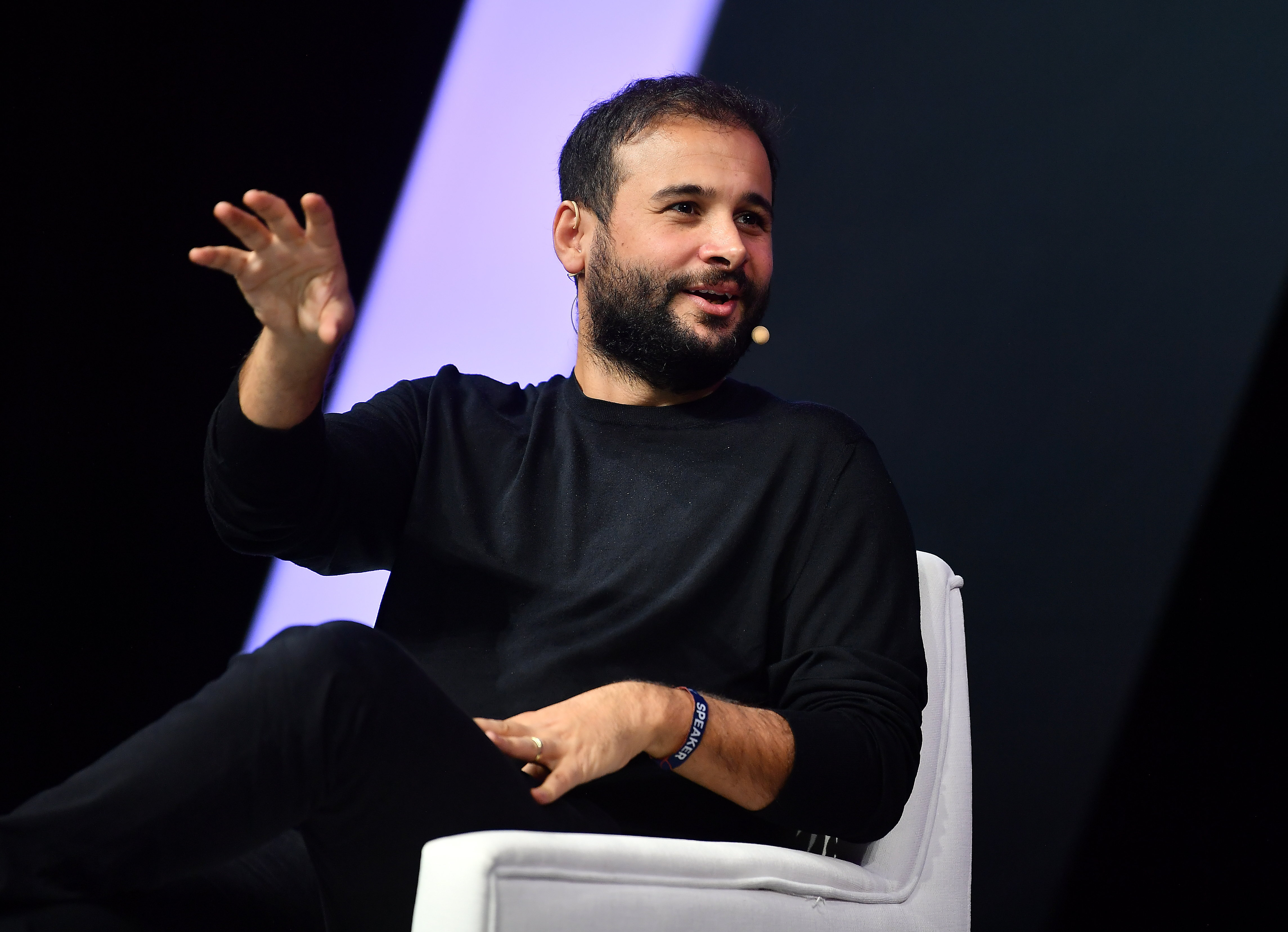
Eren Bali, Founder of Udemy and Carbonhealth

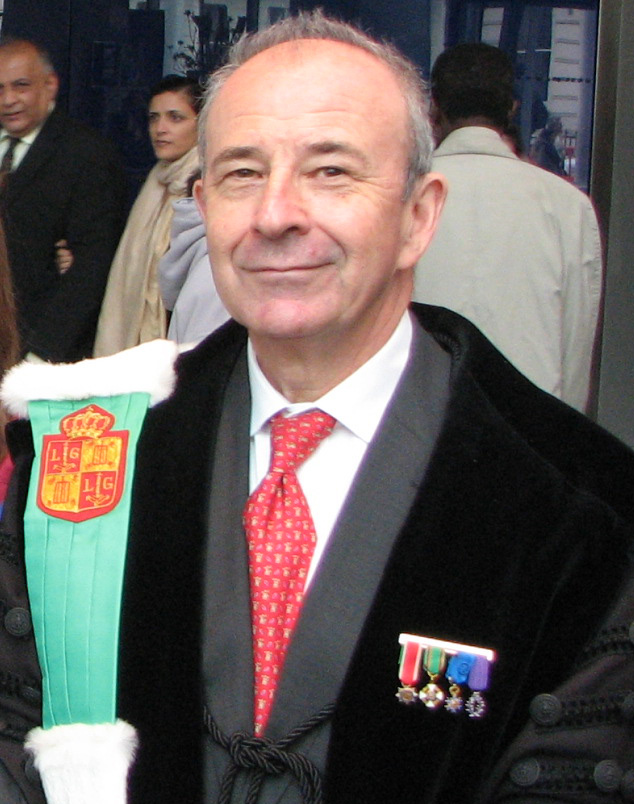
Erol Gelenbe, Turkish-French computer scientist, electronic engineer and applied mathematician

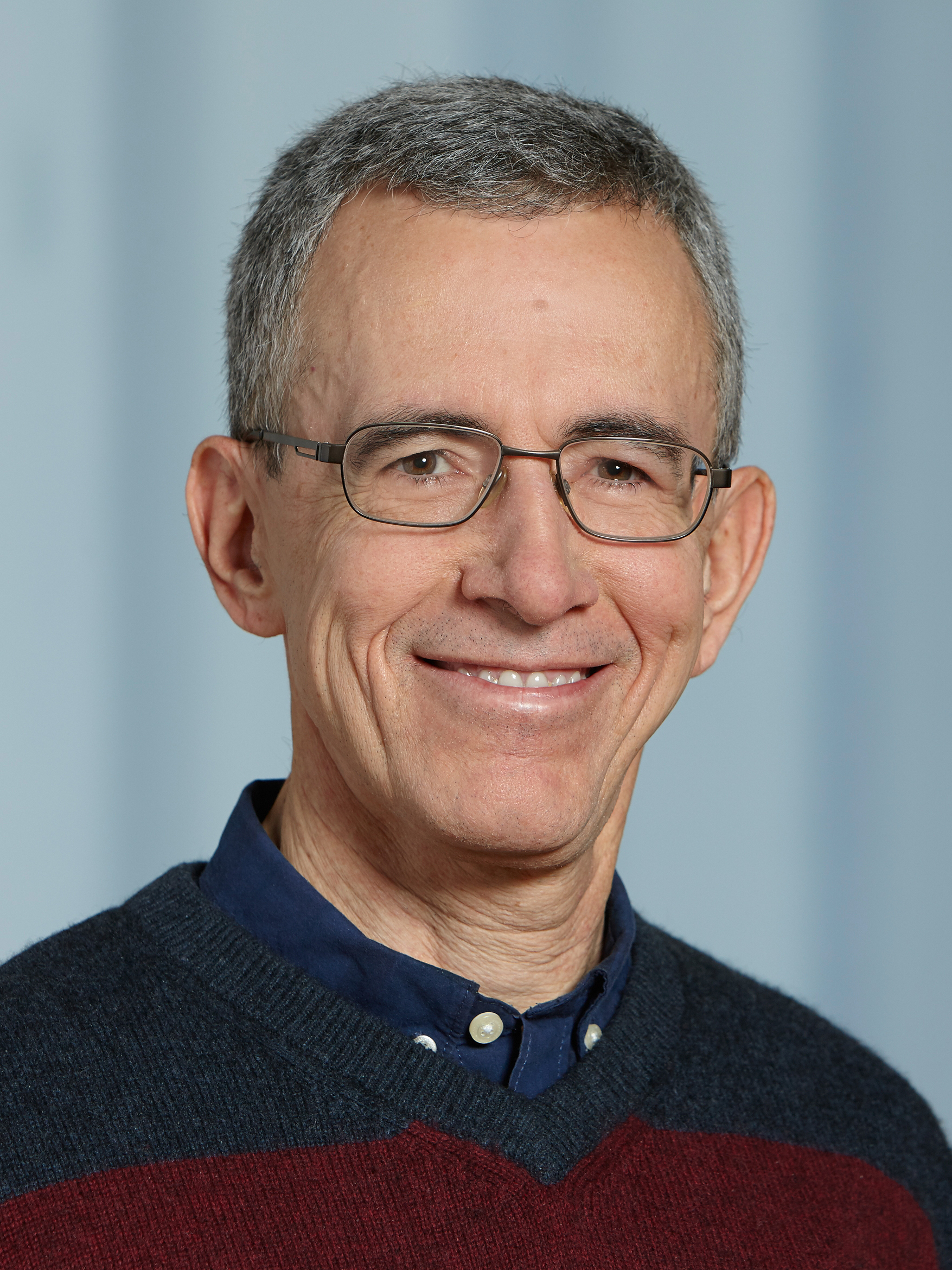
Ataç İmamoğlu, Turkish-Swiss physicist working on quantum optics and quantum computation

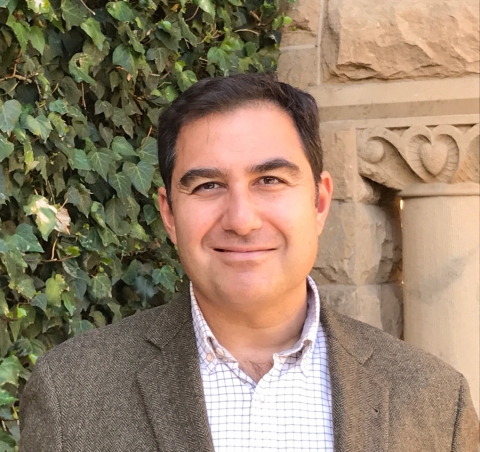
Ali Yaycıoğlu, Historian at Stanford University

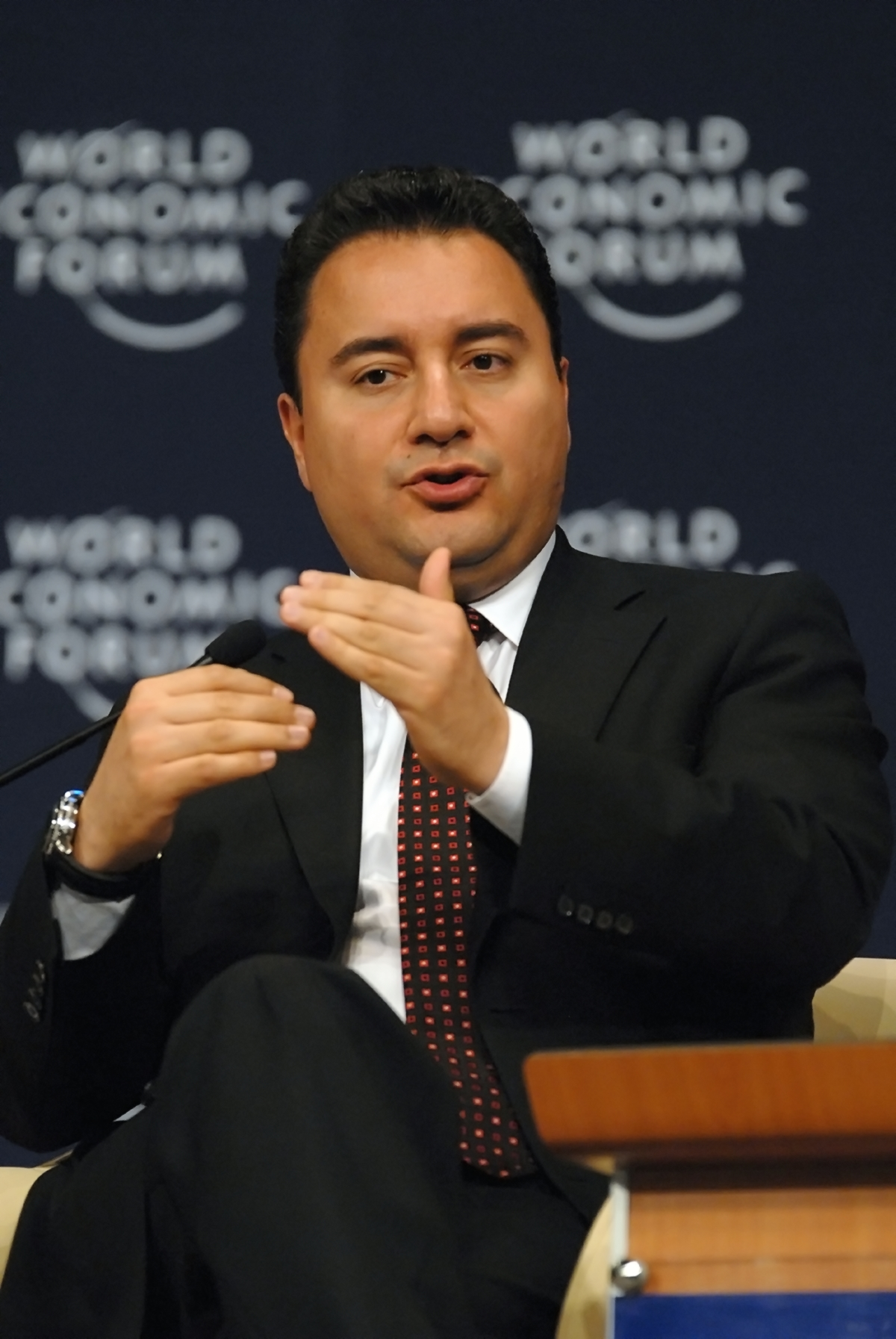
Ali Babacan, Turkish politician and former Minister of Economy

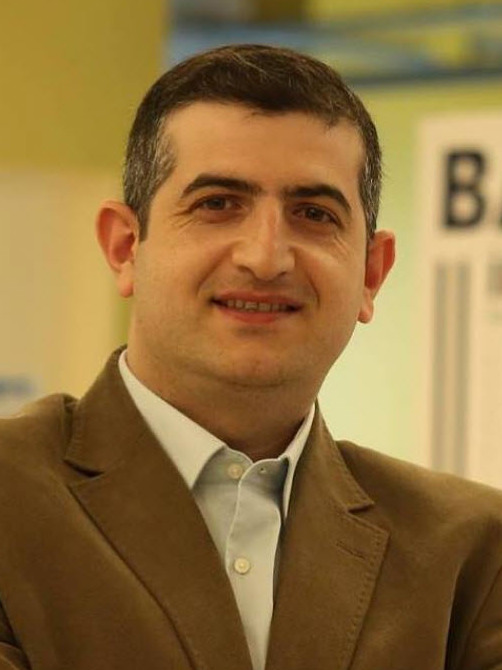
Haluk Bayraktar, CEO of Baykar and board member of TÜBİTAK

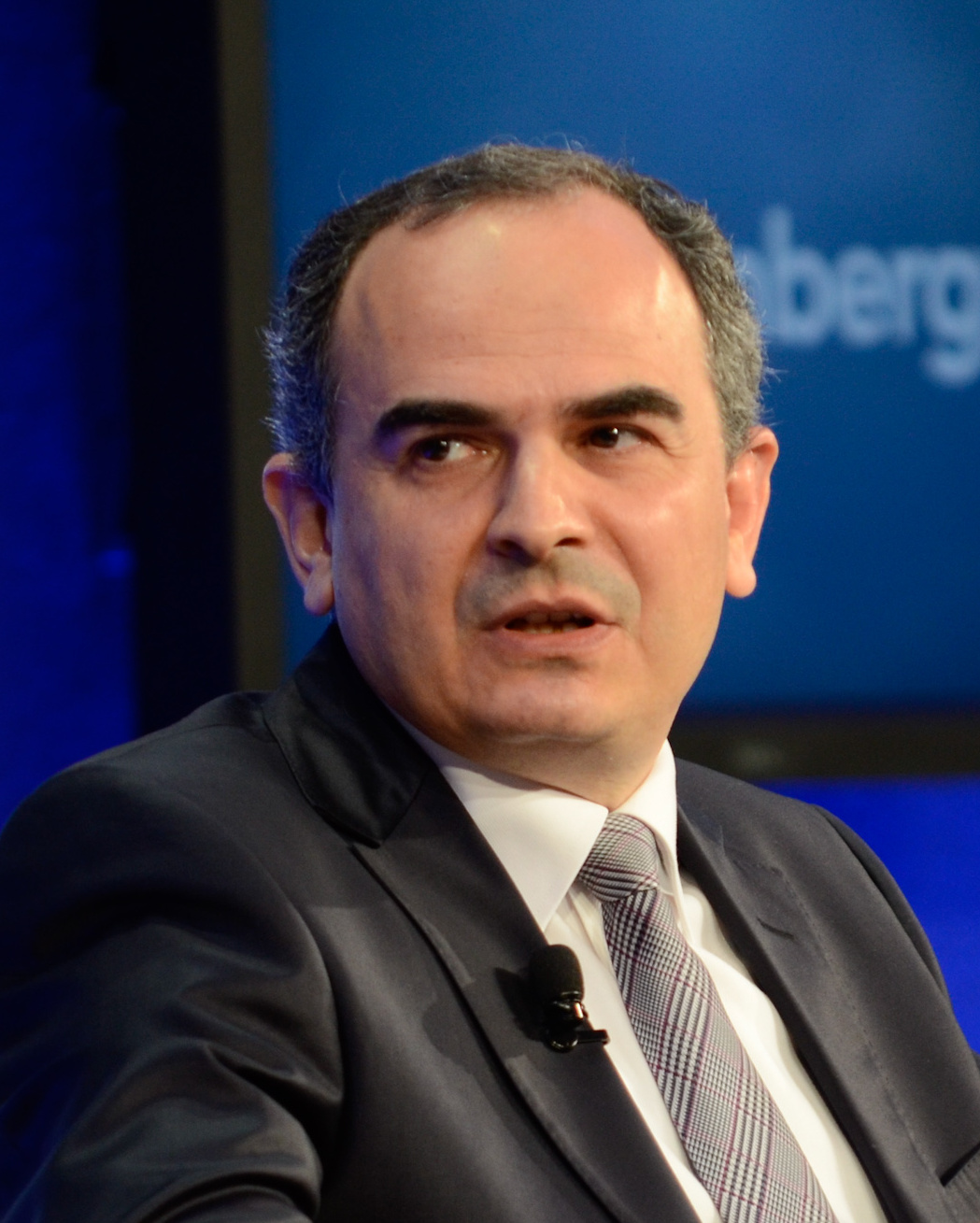
Erdem Başçı, Former Governor of the Central Bank of the Republic of Turkey
- Abdullah Atalar (B.Eng.) – M.Sc. and Ph.D. in Stanford University, former president of Bilkent University
- Abzal Saparbekuly (B.S.) – Ambassador of the Republic of Kazakhstan to Turkey
- Ahmet Bozer (B.BA.) – Vice president of The Coca-Cola Company
- Alev Alatlı (B.S. 1963) – Economics, economist, writer and columnist
- Ali Babacan (B.S. 1988) – Politician and former Deputy Prime Minister of Turkey
- Ali Yaycıoğlu (B.S. 1994) – Historian, currently at Stanford University
- Amir Farshad Ebrahimi (Ph.D.) – Human rights activist in Iran, journalist
- Arda Denkel (B.S. 1972) – Philosopher, D.Phil. at the University of Oxford
- Ataç İmamoğlu (B.Eng.) – Electrical engineer, Ph.D. Stanford University, former researcher at Harvard University and currently head of Quantum Photonics Group and professor at ETHZ
- Aylin Nazlıaka (B.S.) – Economist, businesswoman and politician, Emerging Leaders program at Harvard Kennedy School and former lecturer at Bilkent University, member of Republican People's Party
- Bilal Akin (B.S., M.Sc.) – Electrical engineer, faculty member of The University of Texas at Dallas, recipient of a National Science Foundation CAREER Award and fellow of the IEEE
- Boğaç Ergene – Historian, B.Sc. at METU, M.Sc. at LSE, Ph.D. at Ohio State University. Currently at University of Vermont
- Burçak Özoğlu Poçan (B.S.) – Mountaineer, one of the four Turkish female summiteers of Mount Everest
- Can Dündar (M.S. 1988, Ph.D. 1996) – Journalist, B.S. in journalism at London School of Journalism, receiver of Reporters Without Borders prize in 2015
- Cevdet Yılmaz (B.Sc.) – B.Sc. Economics, Ph.D. in Bilkent University and former Deputy Prime Minister of Turkey and minister at Ministry of Development
- Cüneyd Düzyol (1988) – B.Eng. in Civil Engineering, M.Sc. in economics at University of Illinois at Urbana–Champaign and former minister at Ministry of Development
- Ece Sükan (B.S. 1998) – Turkish model and former editor-at-large at Vogue Turkey
- Elif Şafak – Best-selling Turkish novelist and columnist, receiver of Ordre des Arts et des Lettres in 2010
- Emin Çölaşan – Turkish journalist and columnist
- Emre Koksal – Computer scientist, electrical engineer and entrepreneur
- Eren Bali (B.S. 2005) – Mathematics and Computer Engineering, founder and CEO of Udemy
- Erol Gelenbe (B.S. 1966) – Ph.D. NYU (1970), D.Sc. Sorbonne (1973), electrical engineer and computer scientist, Fellow of the Royal Academy of Science, Letters and Fine Arts of Belgium, Fellow of the Science Academies of Hungary, Poland and Turkey, Fellow of the National Academy of Technologies of France, chair of the Informatics Section of Academia Europaea
- Erdem Başçı (B.Sc.) – M.Sc. in Johns Hopkins University, M.Sc., Ph.D. and professor of economics in Bilkent University and head of Central Bank of the Republic of Turkey
- Erdem Duhan Özensoy (B.S. 2009) – Businessman, boardmember of Kimetsan
- Eylem Elif Maviş (B.S., M.B.A.) – Mountaineer, first Turkish female summiteer of Mount Everest
- Fikri Işık – Educator, politician and Minister of Science, Industry and Technology
- Gülnur Tumbat – Academic of marketing, mountaineer
- Hakan Topal (B.Sc. 1996, M.Sc. 1999) – Civil Engineering and Gender and Women's Studies, artist and professor at Purchase College, New York
- Haluk Bayraktar (B.S. 2000) – CEO of Baykar and board member of TÜBİTAK
- Ibrahim Tarik Ozbolat (B.S. 2006, B.S. 2007) – Mechanical engineering, academic at the Pennsylvania State University
- Ilkay Altintas (B.S. 1999, M.S. 2001) – Computer engineering, Chief Data Science Officer of San Diego Supercomputer Center
- Javaid Laghari (M.S. EE 1975) – Ph.D. SUNY Buffalo 1980, former senator in Pakistan Senate, former president and project director SZABIST, chairperson Higher Education Commission (HEC), Pakistan, coordinator general COMSTECH, commissioner higher education, Ministry of Education, UAE
- Kürşad Tüzmen (B.S. 1981) – M.Sc. in international relations at University of Illinois and former Minister of International Trade and Customs
- Mehmet Ali Talat (M.Sc. 1977) – President of Turkish Republic of Northern Cyprus
- Mehrafza Mirzazad Barijugh (B.S. 2009) – Industrial designer Red Dot Design: Design Concept Best of the Best Award 2010
- M. Tamer Özsu (B.S. 1974, M.S. 1978) – Ph.D. at Ohio State University; university professor at University of Waterloo Cheriton School of Computer Science; Fellow of Royal Society of Canada, Fellow of American Association for the Advancement of Science, Fellow of Association for Computing Machinery, Fellow of Institute of Electrical and Electronics Engineers
- Müge Fermen (B.S. 1986) – First female aeronautical engineering graduate. MS in aerospace engineering and Ph.D. in mechanical engineering from University of Dayton, Ohio, US. Award-winning program manager in R&D.
- Naşide Gözde Durmuş (B.S. 2007) – Scientist at Stanford University, recognized among the "World's Top 35 Innovators Under 35" (TR35) in 2015, as a pioneer in biotechnology and medicine, by MIT Technology Review
- Nabi Avcı (B.S. 1986) – Board member of Scientific and Technological Research Council of Turkey chairman of the Turkey National Committee of UNESCO, minister of Ministry of National Education
- Rita Orji (MS.C, 2009) – Computer Science Professor, Canada Research Chair, Top 150 Canadian Women in Science, Technology, Engineering, and Mathematics (STEM), Member, Royal Society of Canada, Global Young Academy, Top 100 Canada's Most Powerful Women
- Salih Neftçi (B.S.) – Economist, financial expert, author of the book An Introduction to Mathematics of Financial Derivatives
- Serhan Poçan (B.S.) – Mountaineer, summiteer of Mount Everest
- Süreyya Serdengeçti (B.S. 1979) – Economist, former governor of the Central Bank of Turkey
- Svante Cornell (B.S.) – International relations, founder of Institute for Security and Development Policy, associate professor at Johns Hopkins University SAIS and associate professor at Uppsala University
- Şebnem Ferah (B.S.) – Famous rock singer and songwriter
- Taner Akçam (B.S. 1976) – Historian, sociologist and author
- Tugce Aktas (B.S.) – Ph.D. at EMBL, Max Planck Research Group Leader at the Max Planck Institute for Molecular Genetics
- Tülay Adali (B.S. 1987) – Electrical engineer, M.Sc. and Ph.D. at North Carolina State University and distinguished university professor at University of Maryland, Baltimore County, Fellow of the American Institute for Medical and Biological Engineering, Fellow of the Institute of Electrical and Electronics Engineers
- Tunç Hamarat (B.S.) – Chess player, grandmaster and International Correspondence Chess Federation World Champion in 2004
- Turgay Uzer (B.S.) – Theoretical physicist, Ph.D. in Harvard University, Regent's professor at Georgia Institute of Technology
- Ümran İnan (B.Sc. and M.Sc.) – Ph.D. in electrical engineering at Stanford University and president of Koç University and Aeronautics and Space Administration NASA group achievement award in 1983, 1998 and 2004
- Yasemin Dalkılıç (B.S.) – Holder of world records in free diving
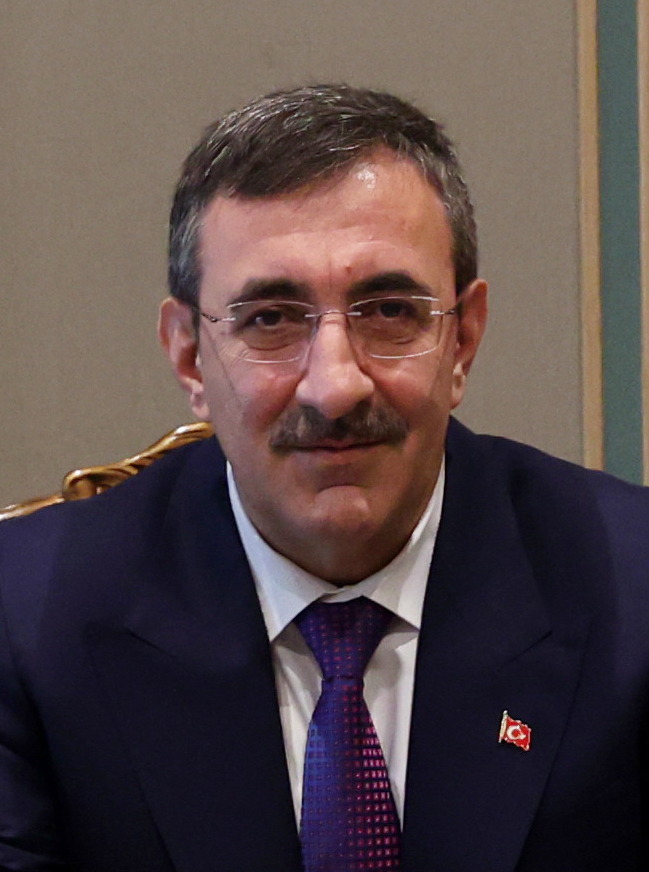
Cevdet Yılmaz, Vice President of Turkey

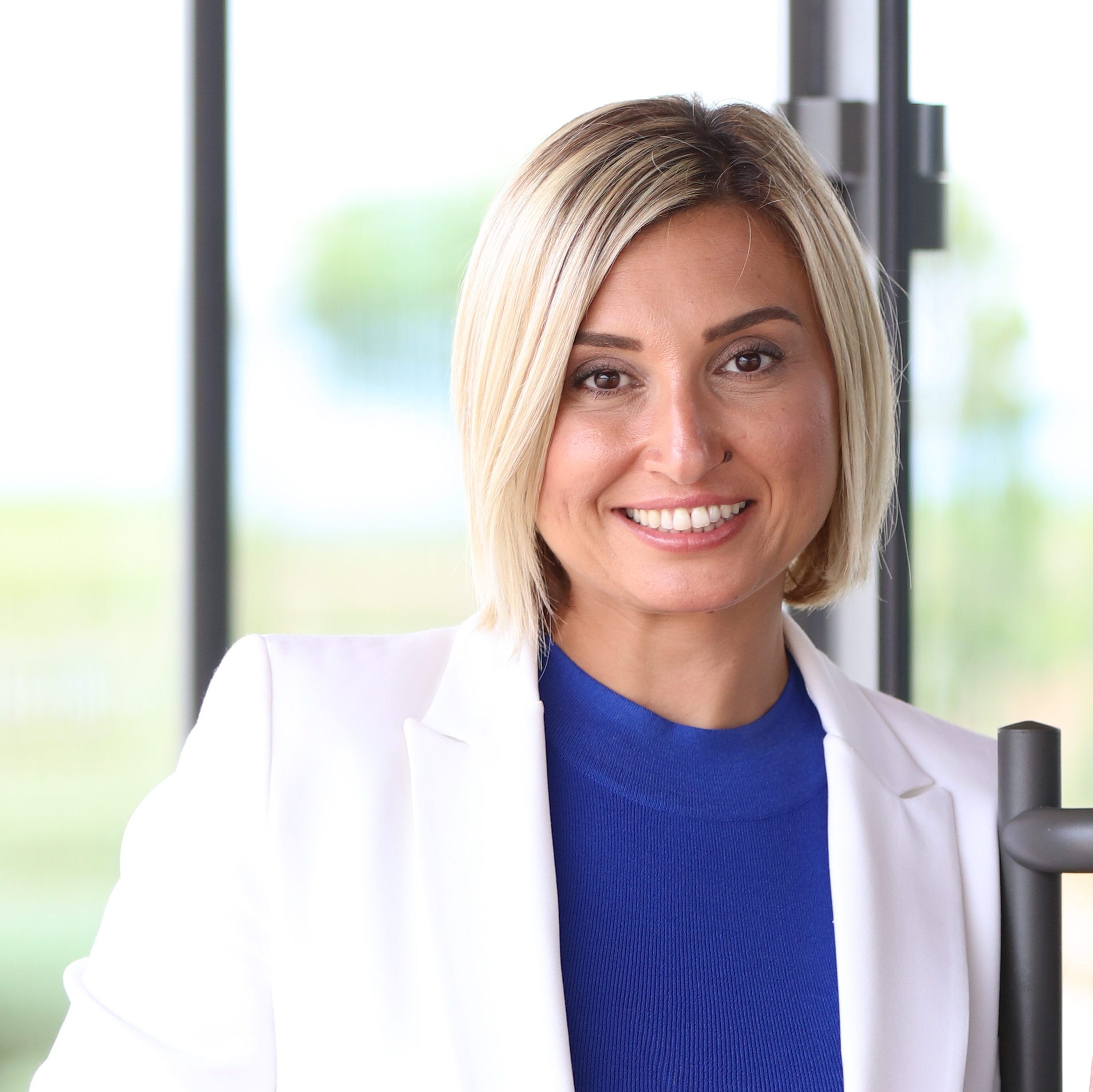
Ilkay Altintas, Chief Data Science Officer of the San Diego Supercomputer Center at the University of California, San Diego

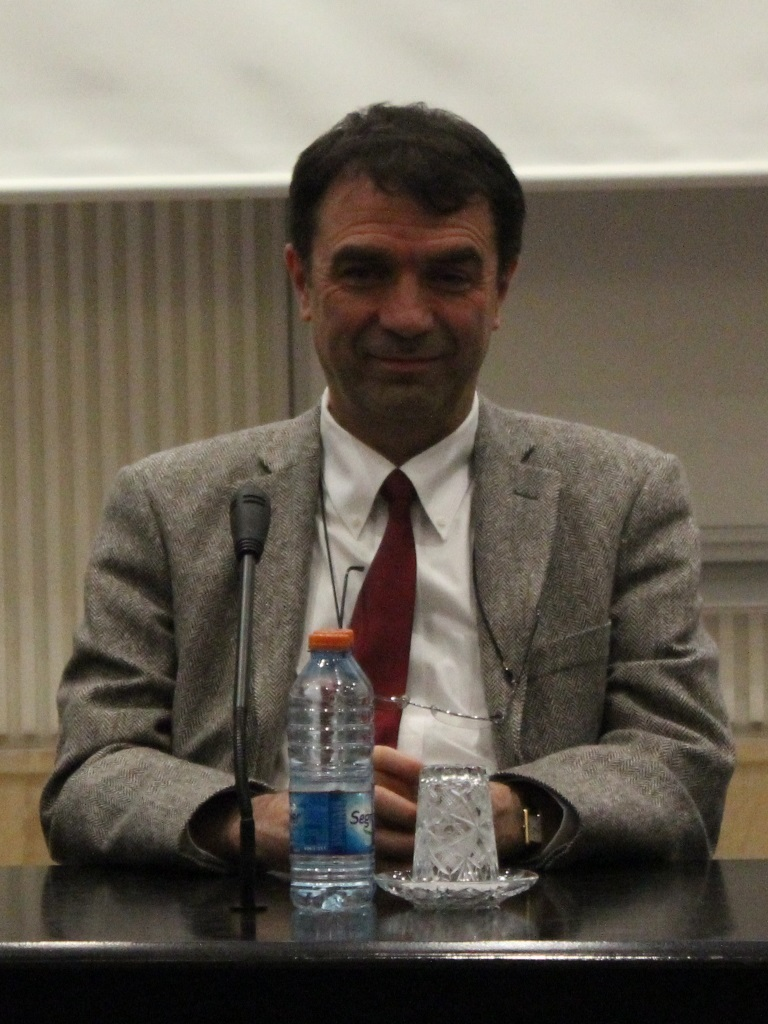
Abdullah Atalar, Former Rector of Bilkent University

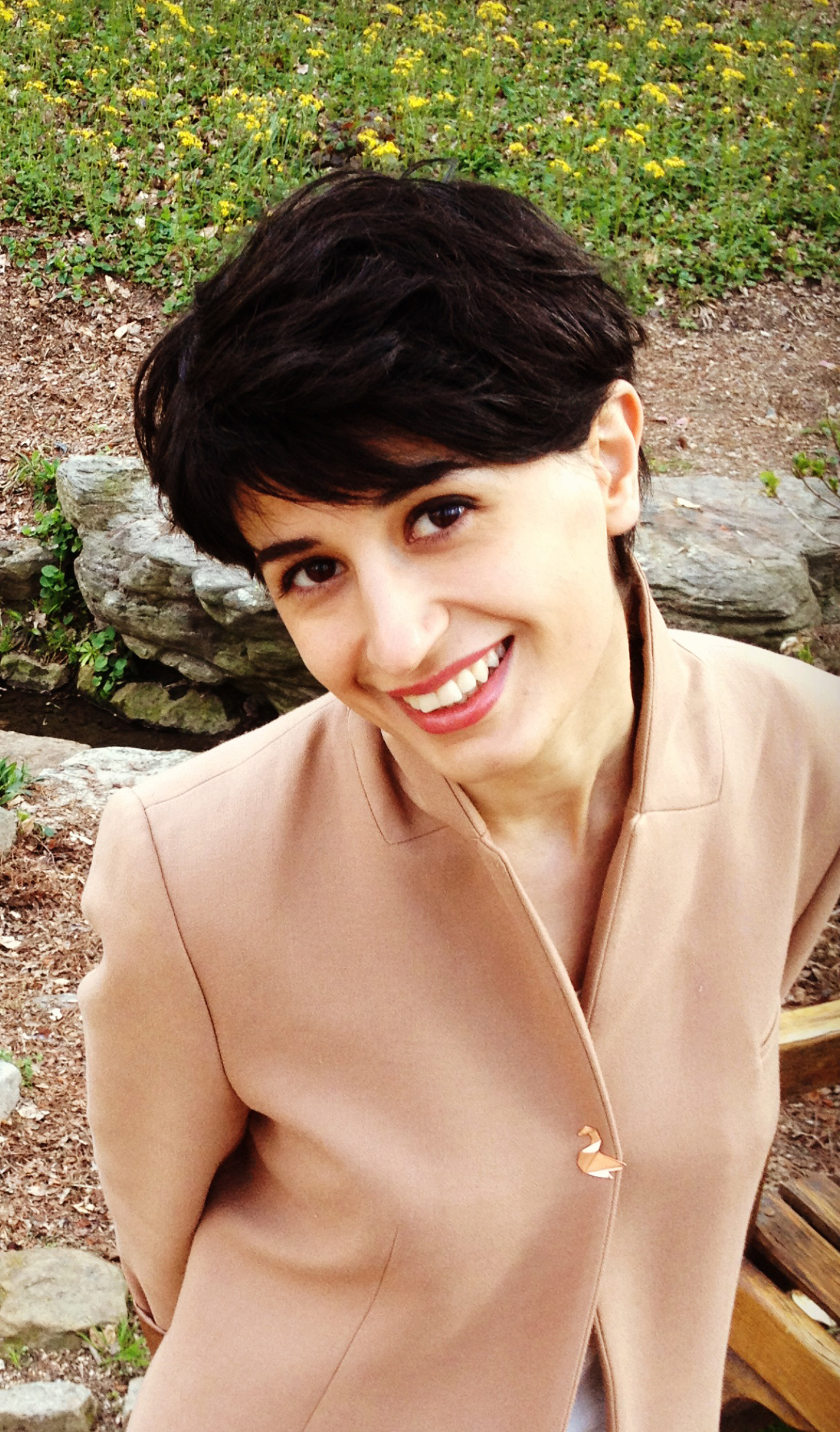
Mehrafza Mirzazad Barijugh, Red Dot Award-winning industrial designer

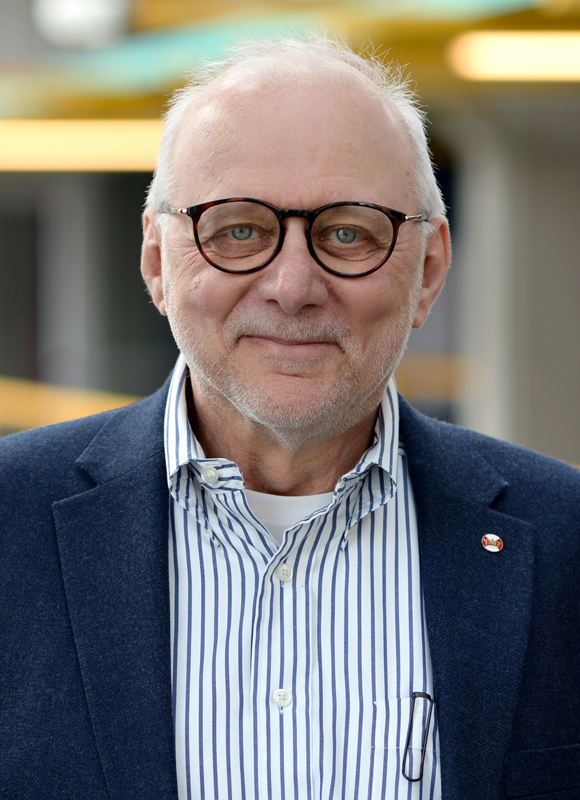
M. Tamer Özsu, Turkish-Canadian computer scientist at the University of Waterloo

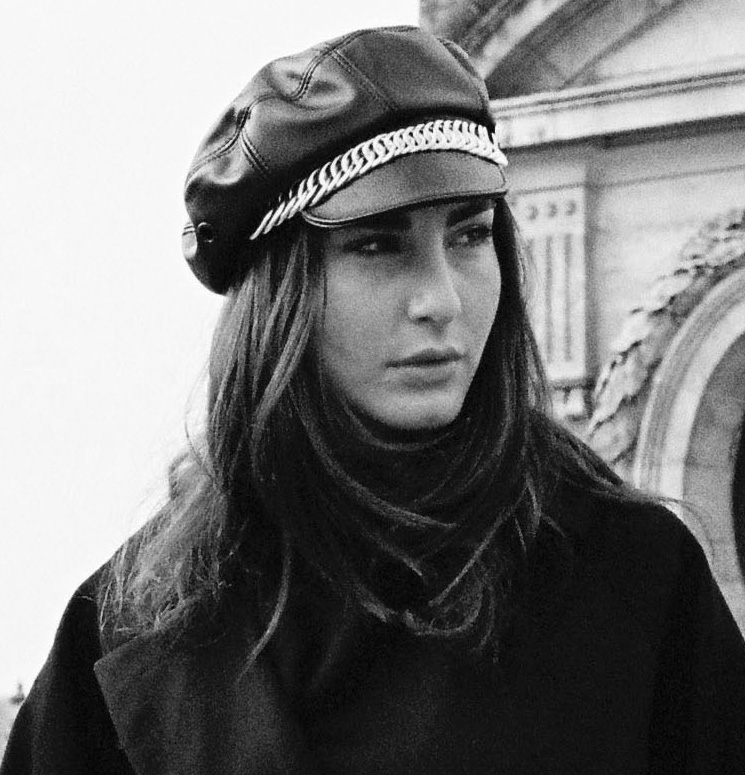
Ece Sükan, Former editor-at-large of Vogue Turkey

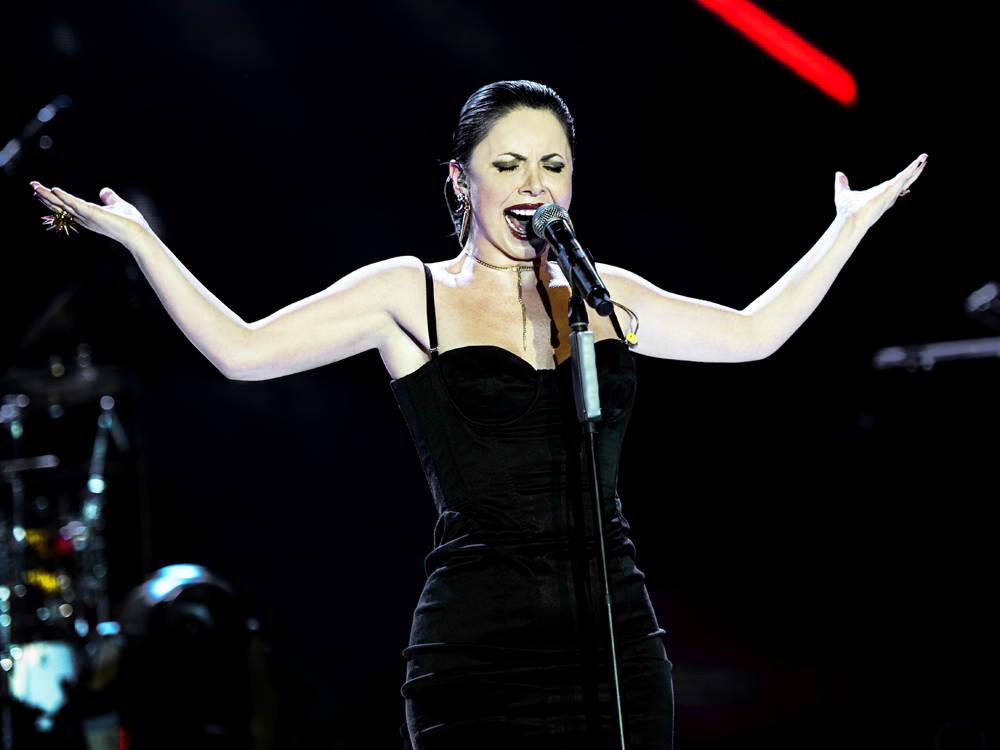
Şebnem Ferah, Turkish singer, songwriter and composer

=== METU International Advisory Board ===
- Prof. Alexander Lenz – Chair of the Particle Physics Department at the University of Siegen
- Prof. Dr. Nurcan Baç (METU '80) – Deputy Dean of the Whitacre College of Engineering at the Texas Tech University
- Prof. Dr. Oya Atalay Franck (METU '89) – Dean of the ZHAW School of Architecture, Design, and Civil Engineering
- Prof. Dr. Oya I. Tukel (METU '88) – Dean of the NJIT Martin Tuchman School of Management
- Prof. Peter Agre – Bloomberg Distinguished Professor at the Johns Hopkins, Nobel Prize in Chemistry (2003)
- Dr. William Colglazier – Former US Science and Technology Adviser to the Secretary of State
- Prof. Dr. Eng. Yusuf Altıntaş – Department of Mechanical Engineering at the University of British Columbia

== See also ==
- METU Parlar Foundation Science Award
- List of Middle East Technical University rectors
- METU Science and Technology Museum
- Institute of technology
- List of universities in Ankara
- List of universities in Turkey
