= Turkish names in space =

List of celestial bodies with Anatolian and Turkish-origin names approved by the IAU

This is a list of astronomical objects officially recognized by the International Astronomical Union (IAU) whose names originate from Anatolian culture, geography, history, and the Turkish language.

== Asteroids ==
Asteroid designations are official numerical identifiers assigned by the International Astronomical Union (IAU) after an asteroid's orbit has been determined with sufficient precision. The numbering system follows the chronological order of official recognition, and the table below lists asteroids with names of Anatolian and Turkish origin.

Asteroid	Name Origin
25 Phocaea	Foça
65 Cybele	Cybele
110 Lydia	Lydia
791 Ani	Ani
887 Alinda	Alinda
1174 Marmara	Sea of Marmara
1457 Ankara	Ankara
3912 Troja	Troy
7793 Mutlu-Pakdil	Burçin Mutlu-Pakdil
11695 Mattei	Janet Akyüz Mattei
13096 Tigris	Tigris River
20936 Nemrut Dagi	Mount Nemrut
43667 Dumlupinar	TCG Dumlupınar
56000 Mesopotamia	Mesopotamia
96205 Ararat	Mount Ararat
110625 Feryalözel	Feryal Özel
265380 Terzan	Agop Terzan
266854 Sezenaksu	Sezen Aksu
284919 Kacar	Betül Kaçar
294296 Efeso	Ephesus
345868 Halicarnassus	Mausoleum at Halicarnassus
719840 Bilsemduzce	Düzce
819712 Tezel	Tunç Tezel

== Craters ==
The impact craters officially named after Anatolian and Turkish cultural and geographical elements are listed below.

Crater	Namesake / Origin	Celestial Body
Osman	Turkish masculine name	Moon
Berkel	Sabri Berkel	Mercury
Sinan	Mimar Sinan	Mercury
Ustad Isa	Ustad Isa (Note: Turkish/Persian architect (17th century).)	Mercury
Adivar	Halide Edib Adıvar	Venus
Guzel	Turkish first name	Venus
Khatun	Mihri Hatun	Venus
Bozkir	Bozkır, Konya	Mars
Can	Çan, Çanakkale	Mars
Hashir	Pervari, Siirt (old name)	Mars
Mut	Mut, Mersin	Mars
Sinop	Sinop	Mars
Tarsus	Tarsus, Mersin	Mars
Zir	Zir, Osmaniye, Sincan, Ankara	Mars
Yalova	Yalova	951 Gaspra
Erlik	Erlik	Callisto
Tulpar	Tulpar	Rhea
Nasreddin	Nasreddin Hodja	Charon

== Other Surface Features ==
Other planetary surface features officially named after Anatolian and Turkish cultural and geographical elements are listed below.

Feature	Feature Type	Namesake / Origin	Celestial Body
Mons Argaeus	Mons	Mount Erciyes	Moon
Montes Taurus	Mons	Taurus Mountains	Moon
Selen Rupes	Rupes	RV MTA Selen	Mercury
Ak-Ene Corona	Corona	Ak Ana "White Mother"	Venus
Otygen Corona	Corona	Etugen Ana "Mother Earth"	Venus
Su-Anasy Corona	Corona	Su Ana "Mother of Water"	Venus
Umay-ene Corona	Corona	Umay Ana "Goddess of Fertility"	Venus
Cebrenia	Albedo feature	Cebrenia	Mars
Chersonesus	Albedo feature	Gallipoli	Mars
Chrysokeras	Albedo feature	Golden Horn	Mars
Hellespontus	Albedo feature	Dardanelles	Mars
Propontis	Albedo feature	Sea of Marmara	Mars
Gediz Vallis	Vallis	Gediz River	Mars
Granicus Valles	Vallis	Biga River	Mars
Hermus Vallis (Note: Gediz Vallis and Hermus Vallis on Mars are named after the Gediz River in Turkey; Hermus is the ancient Latin name of the same river.)	Vallis	Gediz River	Mars
Sakarya Vallis	Vallis	Sakarya River	Mars
Scamander Vallis	Vallis	Karamenderes River	Mars
Harran Sulci	Sulcus	Harran, Şanlıurfa	Enceladus
Van Lacus	Lacus	Lake Van	Titan
Piri Rupes	Rupes	Piri Reis	Pluto

== Stars and Exoplanets ==
The star and exoplanet named after Anatolian and Turkish culture through the International Astronomical Union (IAU) campaign are listed below.

Official IAU Name	Scientific Designation	Object Type	Constellation	Galaxy	Namesake / Origin
Anatolia	WASP-52	Star	Pegasus	Milky Way	Anatolia
Göktürk	WASP-52b	Exoplanet	Pegasus	Milky Way	Göktürks
