= Ustad Isa (crater) =

Crater on Mercury

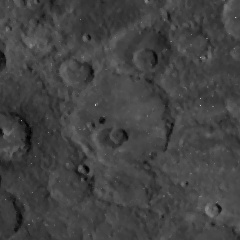
- Mariner 10 image
- Planet: Mercury
- Coordinates: 31.91°S 166.11°W
- Quadrangle: Michelangelo
- Diameter: 138 km (86 mi)
- Eponym: Ustad Isa

Ustad Isa is an impact crater on Mercury. Its name was adopted by the IAU in 1979.

Ustad Isa is east of the prominent rayed crater Bashō. To the south of Ustad Isa are Takayoshi and Barma.

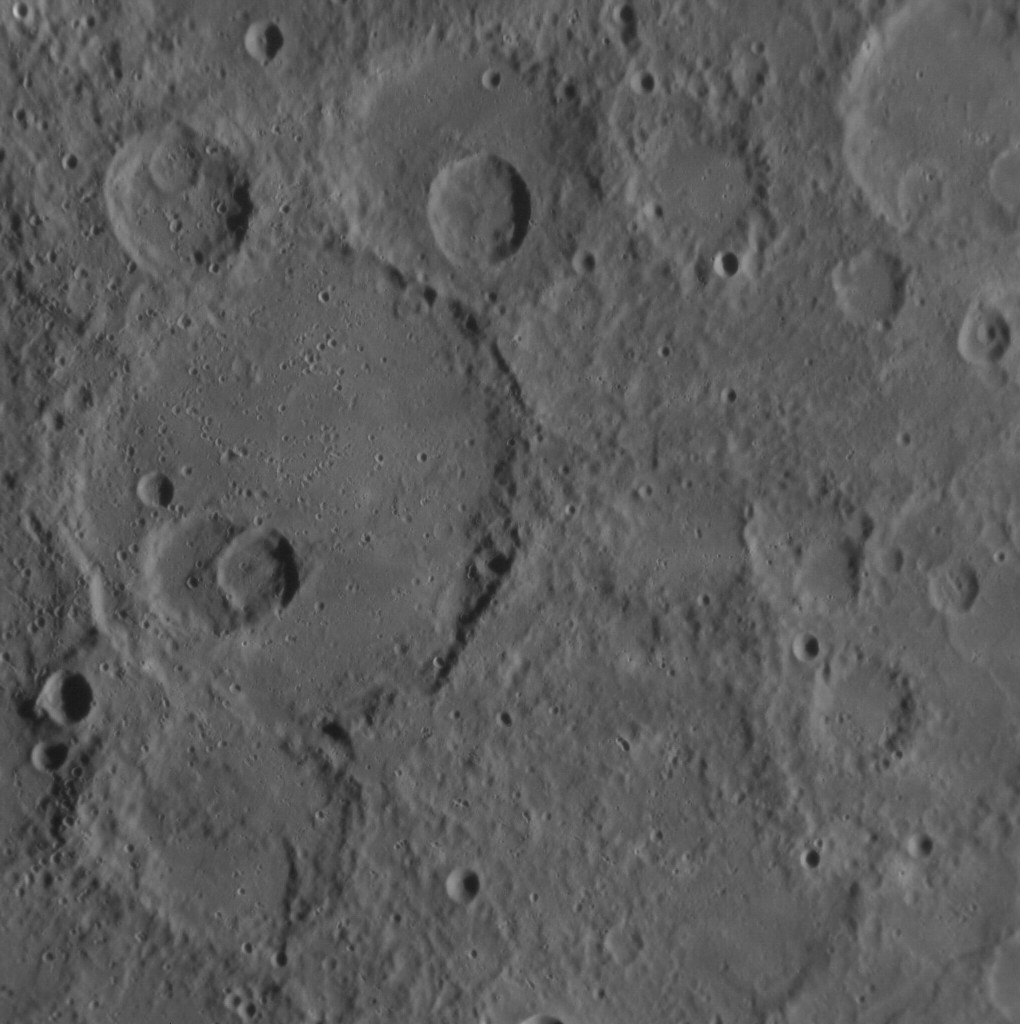
MESSENGER image
