= WASP-52 =

Star in the constellation Pegasus

WASP-52 / Anadolu
Observation data Epoch J2000 Equinox ICRS
- Constellation: Pegasus
- Right ascension: 23^{h} 13^{m} 58.7576^{s}
- Declination: +08° 45′ 40.572″
- Apparent magnitude (V): 12.0

Characteristics
- Evolutionary stage: Main sequence
- Spectral type: K2V

Astrometry
Radial velocity (R_{v})	−0.54±0.61 km/s
Proper motion (μ)	RA: −6.942 mas/yr Dec.: −44.330 mas/yr
Parallax (π)	5.7262±0.0134 mas
Distance	570 ± 1 ly (174.6 ± 0.4 pc)

Details
Mass	0.87±0.03 M_{☉}
Radius	0.79±0.02 R_{☉}
Luminosity	0.4 L_{☉}
Surface gravity (log g)	4.58±0.01 cgs
Temperature	5,000±100 K
Metallicity [Fe/H]	0.03±0.12 dex
Rotation	16±2 d
Rotational velocity (v sin i)	1.77^{+0.19}_{−0.20} km/s
Age	10.7^{+1.9}_{−4.5} Gyr

Other designations
- Anadolu, TIC 427685831, WASP-52, 2MASS J23135873+0845405

Database references
SIMBAD	data
Exoplanet Archive	data

WASP-52, also named Anadolu, is a K-type main-sequence star about 570 light-years away in the constellation Pegasus. It is older than the Sun at 10.7+1.9
−4.5 billion years, but it has a similar fraction of heavy elements. The star has prominent starspot activity, with 3% to 14% of the stellar surface covered by areas 575±150 K cooler than the rest of the photosphere.

A multiplicity survey in 2015 did not detect any stellar companions.

== Nomenclature ==
The designation WASP-52 comes from the Wide Angle Search for Planets.

This was one of the systems selected to be named in the 2019 NameExoWorlds campaign during the 100th anniversary of the IAU, which assigned each country a star and planet to be named. This system was assigned to Turkey. The approved names were Anadolu for the star, after the Turkish name for Anatolia, and Göktürk for the planet after the Göktürks, a historical group of Turkic people.

== Planetary system ==
In 2012 a transiting hot Jupiter planet, WASP-52b, was detected in a tight, circular orbit. The planet was named Göktürk by Turkish astronomers in December 2019. The planet has a small measured temperature difference between dayside (1481±34 K) and nightside (1224±77 K). The planetary orbit is well aligned with the equatorial plane of the star, the misalignment being 5.47^{+4.61}_{−4.21}°.

Search for transit timing variation did not result in the detection of additional planets in system as of 2021.

A transmission spectrum taken in 2020 has revealed the presence of hydrogen, sodium and potassium, although the sodium and potassium lines may be attributable to volcanically active moons of the gas giant, not the planet itself. The atmosphere has no high winds and relatively low-lying clouds, indicating it is not significantly enriched by heavy elements. No signs of the planetary atmosphere escaping to space were detected in 2020, but updated measurement in 2022 showed signs of helium escape, consistent with mass loss rate of 0.5% per billion years.

The WASP-52 planetary system
Companion (in order from star)	Mass	Semimajor axis (AU)	Orbital period (days)	Eccentricity	Inclination (°)	Radius
b (Göktürk)	0.459^{+0.022}_{−0.021} M_{J}	0.02713^{+0.00031}_{−0.00032}	1.7497835±0.0000011	<0.092	85.35±0.20	1.27±0.03 R_{J}
