= Lacus =

The Latin word lacus means "opening, hole, pool, lake," and was also the word for a distribution point in the public water supply of ancient Rome. It can refer to:

== Geography ==
- Lucrinus Lacus, a lake in Campania
- Albanus Lake, Lake Albano in Lazio, Italy
- Alsietinus Lacus, the ancient name of a lake in Etruria today known as Lake Martignano
- Lacus Curtius, a topographical feature in ancient Rome
- Lacus Juturnae, a spring and man-made religious structure in ancient Rome

== Scientific ==
- Lacus (beetle), a genus in the family Eucnemidae
- Lacus may refer to a lunar mare; see List of maria on the Moon:
  - Lacus Aestatis
  - Lacus Autumni
  - Lacus Bonitatis
  - Lacus Excellentiae
  - Lacus Felicitatis
  - Lacus Mortis
  - Lacus Solitudinis
  - Lacus Somniorum
  - Lacus Spei
  - Lacus Temporis

Lacus may also refer to similar features on other celestial bodies:

- Ontario Lacus on Titan, a moon of Saturn
- Solis Lacus on Mars

== Fictional characters ==
- Lacus Clyne from Mobile Suit Gundam SEED and Mobile Suit Gundam SEED Destiny anime.

== Associations ==
- Linguistic Association of Canada and the United States

== See also ==
- Lacuna (disambiguation)
