= List of minor planets: 719001–720000 =

The following is a partial list of minor planets, running from minor-planet number 719001 through 720000, inclusive. The primary data for this and other partial lists is based on JPL's "Small-Body Orbital Elements" and data available from the Minor Planet Center. Critical list information is also provided by the MPC, unless otherwise specified from Lowell Observatory. A detailed description of the table's columns and additional sources are given on the main page including a complete list of every page in this series, and a statistical break-up on the dynamical classification of minor planets.

Also see the summary list of all named bodies in numerical and alphabetical order, and the corresponding naming citations for the number range of this particular list. New namings may only be added to this list after official publication, as the preannouncement of names is condemned by the Working Group for Small Bodies Nomenclature of the International Astronomical Union.

Near-Earth obj.	MBA (inner)	MBA (outer)	Centaur
Mars-crosser	MBA (middle)	Jupiter trojan	Trans-Neptunian obj.
Unclassified

== 719001–719100 ==
Designation			Discovery			Properties		Ref
Permanent	Provisional	Named after	Date	Site	Discoverer(s)	Category	Diam.	Ref
719001	2018 AA_{76}	—	March 4, 2006	Kitt Peak	Spacewatch	·	830 m	MPC · JPL
719002	2018 BN_{3}	—	January 12, 2018	Mount Lemmon	Mount Lemmon Survey	AMO	300 m	MPC · JPL
719003	2018 BB_{9}	—	December 19, 2004	Kitt Peak	Spacewatch	EUN	1.1 km	MPC · JPL
719004	2018 BD_{9}	—	November 20, 2017	Haleakala	Pan-STARRS 1	RAF	740 m	MPC · JPL
719005	2018 BF_{9}	—	January 29, 2014	Catalina	CSS	·	1.2 km	MPC · JPL
719006	2018 BP_{9}	—	September 13, 2004	Kitt Peak	Spacewatch	(5)	1.2 km	MPC · JPL
719007	2018 BB_{10}	—	August 24, 2003	Cerro Tololo	Deep Ecliptic Survey	MAR	860 m	MPC · JPL
719008	2018 BF_{10}	—	October 14, 2012	Kitt Peak	Spacewatch	·	1.6 km	MPC · JPL
719009	2018 BM_{10}	—	January 6, 2005	Socorro	LINEAR	H	600 m	MPC · JPL
719010	2018 BP_{11}	—	February 28, 2014	Haleakala	Pan-STARRS 1	·	1.2 km	MPC · JPL
719011	2018 BX_{12}	—	January 18, 2009	Kitt Peak	Spacewatch	EUN	1.1 km	MPC · JPL
719012	2018 BY_{17}	—	January 20, 2018	Mount Lemmon	Mount Lemmon Survey	·	1.1 km	MPC · JPL
719013	2018 BA_{18}	—	January 20, 2018	Haleakala	Pan-STARRS 1	·	1.8 km	MPC · JPL
719014	2018 BR_{18}	—	January 20, 2018	Mount Lemmon	Mount Lemmon Survey	·	1.5 km	MPC · JPL
719015	2018 BC_{24}	—	January 17, 2018	Haleakala	Pan-STARRS 1	·	1.2 km	MPC · JPL
719016	2018 BG_{26}	—	November 27, 2014	Haleakala	Pan-STARRS 1	L5	6.5 km	MPC · JPL
719017	2018 BB_{33}	—	December 29, 2011	Mount Lemmon	Mount Lemmon Survey	·	2.8 km	MPC · JPL
719018	2018 BB_{36}	—	February 13, 2002	Kitt Peak	Spacewatch	·	740 m	MPC · JPL
719019	2018 BZ_{38}	—	October 17, 2012	Haleakala	Pan-STARRS 1	(5)	960 m	MPC · JPL
719020	2018 BN_{41}	—	December 1, 2008	Kitt Peak	Spacewatch	MAR	740 m	MPC · JPL
719021	2018 BQ_{50}	—	January 20, 2018	Haleakala	Pan-STARRS 1	·	1.8 km	MPC · JPL
719022	2018 CG	—	March 23, 2013	Palomar	Palomar Transient Factory	H	570 m	MPC · JPL
719023	2018 CO	—	October 26, 2009	Mount Lemmon	Mount Lemmon Survey	·	1.7 km	MPC · JPL
719024	2018 CP	—	January 20, 2002	Kitt Peak	Spacewatch	H	600 m	MPC · JPL
719025	2018 CA_{4}	—	January 27, 2007	Mount Lemmon	Mount Lemmon Survey	·	1.1 km	MPC · JPL
719026	2018 CS_{4}	—	November 27, 2006	Mount Lemmon	Mount Lemmon Survey	·	930 m	MPC · JPL
719027	2018 CB_{5}	—	December 19, 2001	Palomar	NEAT	·	1.8 km	MPC · JPL
719028	2018 CH_{5}	—	January 15, 2018	Mount Lemmon	Mount Lemmon Survey	BRA	1.4 km	MPC · JPL
719029	2018 CL_{6}	—	March 3, 2005	Catalina	CSS	·	1.4 km	MPC · JPL
719030	2018 CW_{6}	—	November 9, 2013	Mount Lemmon	Mount Lemmon Survey	·	1.5 km	MPC · JPL
719031	2018 CN_{7}	—	October 15, 2013	Kitt Peak	Spacewatch	·	920 m	MPC · JPL
719032	2018 CU_{7}	—	February 20, 2014	Mount Lemmon	Mount Lemmon Survey	·	1.4 km	MPC · JPL
719033	2018 CD_{8}	—	January 29, 2014	Kitt Peak	Spacewatch	EUN	1.1 km	MPC · JPL
719034	2018 CG_{8}	—	August 26, 2012	Kitt Peak	Spacewatch	·	1.3 km	MPC · JPL
719035	2018 CJ_{8}	—	December 21, 2008	Catalina	CSS	·	1.6 km	MPC · JPL
719036	2018 CV_{8}	—	March 16, 2005	Catalina	CSS	·	1.7 km	MPC · JPL
719037	2018 CJ_{16}	—	March 18, 2010	Mount Lemmon	Mount Lemmon Survey	·	1.2 km	MPC · JPL
719038	2018 CQ_{18}	—	February 12, 2018	Haleakala	Pan-STARRS 1	L5	7.7 km	MPC · JPL
719039	2018 CB_{19}	—	January 10, 2013	Haleakala	Pan-STARRS 1	·	1.3 km	MPC · JPL
719040	2018 CH_{19}	—	April 10, 2014	Haleakala	Pan-STARRS 1	(5)	1.2 km	MPC · JPL
719041	2018 CH_{20}	—	February 12, 2018	Haleakala	Pan-STARRS 1	·	1.6 km	MPC · JPL
719042	2018 CG_{21}	—	February 12, 2018	Haleakala	Pan-STARRS 1	EOS	1.2 km	MPC · JPL
719043	2018 CA_{23}	—	January 2, 2013	Mount Lemmon	Mount Lemmon Survey	·	1.7 km	MPC · JPL
719044	2018 CM_{23}	—	February 12, 2018	Haleakala	Pan-STARRS 1	·	1.3 km	MPC · JPL
719045	2018 CF_{26}	—	February 12, 2018	Haleakala	Pan-STARRS 1	·	1.4 km	MPC · JPL
719046	2018 CV_{26}	—	February 28, 2008	Mount Lemmon	Mount Lemmon Survey	·	1.7 km	MPC · JPL
719047	2018 CN_{39}	—	September 9, 2015	Haleakala	Pan-STARRS 1	·	1.3 km	MPC · JPL
719048	2018 DY_{5}	—	April 20, 2009	Kitt Peak	Spacewatch	·	1.5 km	MPC · JPL
719049	2018 DB_{7}	—	February 21, 2018	Haleakala	Pan-STARRS 1	EOS	1.4 km	MPC · JPL
719050	2018 DR_{7}	—	February 21, 2018	Haleakala	Pan-STARRS 1	·	1.3 km	MPC · JPL
719051	2018 DF_{9}	—	February 23, 2018	Mount Lemmon	Mount Lemmon Survey	AST	1.3 km	MPC · JPL
719052	2018 DK_{9}	—	December 25, 2011	Kitt Peak	Spacewatch	EOS	1.7 km	MPC · JPL
719053	2018 DS_{9}	—	February 23, 2018	Mount Lemmon	Mount Lemmon Survey	·	1.6 km	MPC · JPL
719054	2018 EE_{2}	—	November 28, 2011	Mount Lemmon	Mount Lemmon Survey	H	430 m	MPC · JPL
719055	2018 EJ_{5}	—	March 3, 2005	Catalina	CSS	H	500 m	MPC · JPL
719056	2018 ED_{6}	—	December 31, 2013	Haleakala	Pan-STARRS 1	·	1.2 km	MPC · JPL
719057	2018 EA_{8}	—	December 21, 2008	Kitt Peak	Spacewatch	·	1.2 km	MPC · JPL
719058	2018 EQ_{8}	—	November 6, 2007	Kitt Peak	Spacewatch	DOR	2.7 km	MPC · JPL
719059	2018 EY_{8}	—	December 20, 2012	Catalina	CSS	·	1.8 km	MPC · JPL
719060	2018 EA_{9}	—	November 24, 2011	Haleakala	Pan-STARRS 1	·	2.8 km	MPC · JPL
719061	2018 EU_{11}	—	March 7, 2018	Haleakala	Pan-STARRS 1	·	1.7 km	MPC · JPL
719062	2018 EK_{12}	—	March 10, 2018	Haleakala	Pan-STARRS 1	·	2.1 km	MPC · JPL
719063	2018 EO_{13}	—	January 23, 2018	Mount Lemmon	Mount Lemmon Survey	·	1.0 km	MPC · JPL
719064	2018 EH_{18}	—	June 6, 2014	Mount Lemmon	Mount Lemmon Survey	·	1.3 km	MPC · JPL
719065	2018 FF	—	February 12, 2018	Haleakala	Pan-STARRS 1	H	470 m	MPC · JPL
719066	2018 FQ_{7}	—	September 28, 2006	Kitt Peak	Spacewatch	·	2.1 km	MPC · JPL
719067	2018 FT_{7}	—	October 13, 2006	Kitt Peak	Spacewatch	KOR	1.2 km	MPC · JPL
719068	2018 FG_{8}	—	October 9, 2015	Haleakala	Pan-STARRS 1	·	1.4 km	MPC · JPL
719069	2018 FX_{9}	—	October 15, 2003	Anderson Mesa	LONEOS	·	1.4 km	MPC · JPL
719070	2018 FJ_{10}	—	September 28, 2006	Kitt Peak	Spacewatch	HOF	2.4 km	MPC · JPL
719071	2018 FZ_{10}	—	February 2, 2006	Mount Lemmon	Mount Lemmon Survey	·	930 m	MPC · JPL
719072	2018 FC_{12}	—	December 6, 2007	Mount Lemmon	Mount Lemmon Survey	·	1.4 km	MPC · JPL
719073	2018 FT_{14}	—	March 16, 2010	Mount Lemmon	Mount Lemmon Survey	·	1.3 km	MPC · JPL
719074	2018 FN_{16}	—	March 17, 2018	Haleakala	Pan-STARRS 1	·	2.0 km	MPC · JPL
719075	2018 FL_{20}	—	July 1, 2014	Haleakala	Pan-STARRS 1	·	1.9 km	MPC · JPL
719076	2018 FJ_{21}	—	March 11, 2003	Palomar	NEAT	·	1.2 km	MPC · JPL
719077	2018 FL_{24}	—	July 8, 2003	Mount Graham	W. Ryan, C. Martinez	·	1.4 km	MPC · JPL
719078	2018 FG_{25}	—	March 10, 2018	Haleakala	Pan-STARRS 1	THM	1.7 km	MPC · JPL
719079	2018 FN_{28}	—	December 19, 2000	Kitt Peak	Deep Lens Survey	MAR	970 m	MPC · JPL
719080	2018 FS_{29}	—	March 18, 2018	Haleakala	Pan-STARRS 1	·	2.0 km	MPC · JPL
719081	2018 FJ_{34}	—	March 17, 2018	Mount Lemmon	Mount Lemmon Survey	·	2.0 km	MPC · JPL
719082	2018 FL_{35}	—	March 16, 2018	Mount Lemmon	Mount Lemmon Survey	·	1.4 km	MPC · JPL
719083	2018 FQ_{36}	—	March 18, 2018	Mount Lemmon	Mount Lemmon Survey	·	1.5 km	MPC · JPL
719084	2018 FS_{36}	—	March 19, 2018	Mount Lemmon	Mount Lemmon Survey	·	1.8 km	MPC · JPL
719085	2018 FC_{37}	—	March 17, 2018	Haleakala	Pan-STARRS 1	·	1.5 km	MPC · JPL
719086	2018 FJ_{37}	—	March 18, 2018	Haleakala	Pan-STARRS 1	·	2.2 km	MPC · JPL
719087	2018 FL_{39}	—	March 21, 2018	Mount Lemmon	Mount Lemmon Survey	·	1.9 km	MPC · JPL
719088	2018 FN_{39}	—	March 16, 2018	Mount Lemmon	Mount Lemmon Survey	·	1.6 km	MPC · JPL
719089	2018 FP_{39}	—	March 18, 2018	Haleakala	Pan-STARRS 1	NYS	700 m	MPC · JPL
719090	2018 FH_{41}	—	March 18, 2018	Haleakala	Pan-STARRS 1	·	1.4 km	MPC · JPL
719091	2018 FY_{41}	—	October 10, 2015	Haleakala	Pan-STARRS 1	KOR	1.1 km	MPC · JPL
719092	2018 FG_{42}	—	March 18, 2018	Haleakala	Pan-STARRS 1	·	900 m	MPC · JPL
719093	2018 FM_{44}	—	March 17, 2018	Mount Lemmon	Mount Lemmon Survey	·	2.5 km	MPC · JPL
719094	2018 FP_{45}	—	March 20, 2018	Mount Lemmon	Mount Lemmon Survey	·	1.4 km	MPC · JPL
719095	2018 FY_{47}	—	April 19, 2013	Haleakala	Pan-STARRS 1	·	1.4 km	MPC · JPL
719096	2018 FY_{61}	—	March 17, 2018	Haleakala	Pan-STARRS 1	·	1.2 km	MPC · JPL
719097	2018 GN_{3}	—	February 7, 2000	Kitt Peak	Spacewatch	EUN	1.1 km	MPC · JPL
719098	2018 GV_{4}	—	January 13, 2015	Haleakala	Pan-STARRS 1	H	490 m	MPC · JPL
719099	2018 GD_{6}	—	October 29, 2005	Kitt Peak	Spacewatch	·	2.3 km	MPC · JPL
719100	2018 GY_{6}	—	September 24, 2004	Kitt Peak	Spacewatch	·	3.0 km	MPC · JPL

== 719101–719200 ==
back to top

Designation			Discovery			Properties		Ref
Permanent	Provisional	Named after	Date	Site	Discoverer(s)	Category	Diam.	Ref
719101	2018 GC_{8}	—	July 25, 2014	Haleakala	Pan-STARRS 1	·	1.2 km	MPC · JPL
719102	2018 GS_{8}	—	July 8, 2014	Haleakala	Pan-STARRS 1	·	2.1 km	MPC · JPL
719103	2018 GL_{9}	—	October 9, 2007	Mount Lemmon	Mount Lemmon Survey	·	1.1 km	MPC · JPL
719104	2018 GB_{10}	—	May 15, 2009	Kitt Peak	Spacewatch	·	1.6 km	MPC · JPL
719105	2018 GW_{10}	—	December 10, 2016	Mount Lemmon	Mount Lemmon Survey	·	1.7 km	MPC · JPL
719106	2018 GA_{11}	—	April 14, 2007	Kitt Peak	Spacewatch	THM	1.7 km	MPC · JPL
719107	2018 GM_{11}	—	December 19, 2015	Mount Lemmon	Mount Lemmon Survey	·	2.9 km	MPC · JPL
719108	2018 GZ_{11}	—	August 10, 2010	Kitt Peak	Spacewatch	HOF	2.0 km	MPC · JPL
719109	2018 GN_{12}	—	April 22, 2007	Kitt Peak	Spacewatch	·	2.9 km	MPC · JPL
719110	2018 GB_{16}	—	April 8, 2018	Mount Lemmon	Mount Lemmon Survey	H	440 m	MPC · JPL
719111	2018 GE_{18}	—	April 13, 2018	Haleakala	Pan-STARRS 1	·	1.6 km	MPC · JPL
719112	2018 GG_{18}	—	April 12, 2018	Haleakala	Pan-STARRS 1	·	1.4 km	MPC · JPL
719113	2018 GW_{18}	—	April 10, 2018	Mount Lemmon	Mount Lemmon Survey	T_{j} (2.99) · EUP	2.9 km	MPC · JPL
719114	2018 GU_{19}	—	April 12, 2018	Haleakala	Pan-STARRS 1	·	2.2 km	MPC · JPL
719115	2018 GG_{25}	—	March 20, 2018	Mount Lemmon	Mount Lemmon Survey	·	1.4 km	MPC · JPL
719116	2018 GO_{26}	—	May 9, 2007	Mount Lemmon	Mount Lemmon Survey	THM	1.6 km	MPC · JPL
719117	2018 GE_{29}	—	April 14, 2018	Mount Lemmon	Mount Lemmon Survey	·	1.5 km	MPC · JPL
719118	2018 GZ_{32}	—	July 1, 2014	Haleakala	Pan-STARRS 1	·	1.8 km	MPC · JPL
719119	2018 HM_{4}	—	September 12, 2015	Haleakala	Pan-STARRS 1	·	1.2 km	MPC · JPL
719120	2018 HN_{4}	—	November 4, 2012	Haleakala	Pan-STARRS 1	·	1.2 km	MPC · JPL
719121	2018 HZ_{8}	—	April 8, 2018	Catalina	CSS	·	2.5 km	MPC · JPL
719122	2018 HE_{10}	—	April 15, 2018	Mount Lemmon	Mount Lemmon Survey	·	1.9 km	MPC · JPL
719123	2018 JF_{3}	—	October 24, 2014	Mount Lemmon	Mount Lemmon Survey	L5	9.7 km	MPC · JPL
719124	2018 JX_{3}	—	March 9, 2007	Kitt Peak	Spacewatch	·	1.8 km	MPC · JPL
719125	2018 JY_{3}	—	November 22, 2014	Haleakala	Pan-STARRS 1	·	2.5 km	MPC · JPL
719126	2018 JZ_{3}	—	November 8, 2016	Haleakala	Pan-STARRS 1	·	3.3 km	MPC · JPL
719127	2018 JQ_{4}	—	July 2, 2005	Kitt Peak	Spacewatch	EUN	1.2 km	MPC · JPL
719128	2018 JN_{5}	—	November 12, 2010	Mount Lemmon	Mount Lemmon Survey	·	2.7 km	MPC · JPL
719129	2018 JR_{5}	—	May 3, 2011	Mayhill-ISON	L. Elenin	·	740 m	MPC · JPL
719130	2018 JS_{9}	—	May 12, 2018	Mount Lemmon	Mount Lemmon Survey	·	2.0 km	MPC · JPL
719131	2018 JK_{10}	—	May 1, 2003	Kitt Peak	Spacewatch	NYS	1.0 km	MPC · JPL
719132	2018 JM_{10}	—	May 15, 2018	Mount Lemmon	Mount Lemmon Survey	EOS	1.4 km	MPC · JPL
719133	2018 JU_{10}	—	May 12, 2018	ESA OGS	ESA OGS	·	1.5 km	MPC · JPL
719134	2018 JX_{10}	—	May 14, 2018	Mount Lemmon	Mount Lemmon Survey	·	2.3 km	MPC · JPL
719135	2018 JE_{11}	—	May 14, 2018	Mount Lemmon	Mount Lemmon Survey	·	1.3 km	MPC · JPL
719136	2018 KU_{3}	—	March 1, 2012	Mount Lemmon	Mount Lemmon Survey	TIR	2.0 km	MPC · JPL
719137	2018 KW_{3}	—	April 23, 2007	Mount Lemmon	Mount Lemmon Survey	·	2.1 km	MPC · JPL
719138	2018 KG_{8}	—	May 16, 2018	Mount Lemmon	Mount Lemmon Survey	·	2.2 km	MPC · JPL
719139	2018 KM_{8}	—	May 21, 2018	Haleakala	Pan-STARRS 1	·	1.4 km	MPC · JPL
719140	2018 KA_{10}	—	May 20, 2018	Haleakala	Pan-STARRS 1	EOS	1.5 km	MPC · JPL
719141	2018 KW_{10}	—	May 18, 2018	Mount Lemmon	Mount Lemmon Survey	·	1.6 km	MPC · JPL
719142	2018 KR_{11}	—	May 19, 2018	Haleakala	Pan-STARRS 1	EOS	1.5 km	MPC · JPL
719143	2018 KU_{11}	—	April 12, 2018	Haleakala	Pan-STARRS 1	·	2.3 km	MPC · JPL
719144	2018 KV_{12}	—	November 11, 2009	Kitt Peak	Spacewatch	·	2.0 km	MPC · JPL
719145	2018 KY_{13}	—	May 20, 2018	Haleakala	Pan-STARRS 1	·	2.3 km	MPC · JPL
719146	2018 LT_{1}	—	April 21, 2011	Haleakala	Pan-STARRS 1	T_{j} (2.96)	4.1 km	MPC · JPL
719147	2018 LM_{7}	—	March 27, 2012	Mount Lemmon	Mount Lemmon Survey	·	2.9 km	MPC · JPL
719148	2018 LO_{7}	—	June 5, 2018	Haleakala	Pan-STARRS 1	EOS	1.6 km	MPC · JPL
719149	2018 LP_{7}	—	October 2, 2006	Mount Lemmon	Mount Lemmon Survey	(7744)	1.1 km	MPC · JPL
719150	2018 LG_{8}	—	January 27, 2007	Mount Lemmon	Mount Lemmon Survey	·	1.8 km	MPC · JPL
719151	2018 LH_{8}	—	March 8, 2011	Piszkés-tető	K. Sárneczky, J. Kelemen	·	3.0 km	MPC · JPL
719152	2018 LZ_{8}	—	February 9, 2008	Kitt Peak	Spacewatch	·	1.4 km	MPC · JPL
719153	2018 LA_{9}	—	February 28, 2008	Kitt Peak	Spacewatch	·	2.0 km	MPC · JPL
719154	2018 LE_{9}	—	August 20, 2014	Haleakala	Pan-STARRS 1	EOS	1.6 km	MPC · JPL
719155	2018 LY_{9}	—	September 20, 2014	Haleakala	Pan-STARRS 1	·	2.6 km	MPC · JPL
719156	2018 LH_{11}	—	October 26, 2011	Haleakala	Pan-STARRS 1	·	1.4 km	MPC · JPL
719157	2018 LF_{12}	—	January 4, 2017	Haleakala	Pan-STARRS 1	INA	2.7 km	MPC · JPL
719158	2018 LC_{15}	—	October 24, 2008	Kitt Peak	Spacewatch	·	2.2 km	MPC · JPL
719159	2018 LK_{16}	—	February 27, 2014	Mount Lemmon	Mount Lemmon Survey	·	1.2 km	MPC · JPL
719160	2018 LN_{21}	—	June 8, 2018	Haleakala	Pan-STARRS 1	EOS	1.4 km	MPC · JPL
719161	2018 LF_{26}	—	June 8, 2018	Haleakala	Pan-STARRS 1	·	1.7 km	MPC · JPL
719162	2018 LK_{29}	—	June 15, 2018	Haleakala	Pan-STARRS 1	·	1.7 km	MPC · JPL
719163	2018 LL_{30}	—	June 10, 2018	Haleakala	Pan-STARRS 1	·	1.9 km	MPC · JPL
719164	2018 LS_{31}	—	April 12, 2012	Haleakala	Pan-STARRS 1	·	1.8 km	MPC · JPL
719165	2018 LM_{37}	—	March 21, 2017	Haleakala	Pan-STARRS 1	·	2.1 km	MPC · JPL
719166	2018 LW_{38}	—	June 15, 2018	Haleakala	Pan-STARRS 1	·	1.5 km	MPC · JPL
719167	2018 LZ_{48}	—	June 10, 2018	Haleakala	Pan-STARRS 1	EOS	1.6 km	MPC · JPL
719168	2018 MN_{1}	—	August 28, 2014	Haleakala	Pan-STARRS 1	·	2.2 km	MPC · JPL
719169	2018 MK_{2}	—	March 23, 2012	Mount Lemmon	Mount Lemmon Survey	EOS	1.6 km	MPC · JPL
719170	2018 MO_{7}	—	August 12, 2013	Haleakala	Pan-STARRS 1	·	2.3 km	MPC · JPL
719171	2018 MY_{14}	—	June 17, 2018	Haleakala	Pan-STARRS 1	·	2.3 km	MPC · JPL
719172	2018 MS_{15}	—	May 4, 2009	Kitt Peak	Spacewatch	·	1.2 km	MPC · JPL
719173	2018 NA_{6}	—	October 22, 2008	Kitt Peak	Spacewatch	VER	2.4 km	MPC · JPL
719174	2018 NP_{12}	—	July 28, 2013	Kitt Peak	Spacewatch	·	2.1 km	MPC · JPL
719175	2018 NE_{13}	—	January 23, 2006	Kitt Peak	Spacewatch	·	1.9 km	MPC · JPL
719176	2018 NS_{14}	—	June 23, 2012	Kitt Peak	Spacewatch	VER	3.0 km	MPC · JPL
719177	2018 NR_{15}	—	September 12, 2007	Mount Lemmon	Mount Lemmon Survey	·	2.4 km	MPC · JPL
719178	2018 NB_{22}	—	July 9, 2018	Haleakala	Pan-STARRS 1	·	2.7 km	MPC · JPL
719179	2018 NU_{22}	—	July 8, 2018	Haleakala	Pan-STARRS 1	·	2.5 km	MPC · JPL
719180	2018 NW_{22}	—	July 12, 2018	Haleakala	Pan-STARRS 1	EOS	1.4 km	MPC · JPL
719181	2018 NP_{24}	—	July 12, 2018	Haleakala	Pan-STARRS 2	·	3.0 km	MPC · JPL
719182	2018 NL_{34}	—	July 4, 2018	Haleakala	Pan-STARRS 2	·	450 m	MPC · JPL
719183	2018 NA_{42}	—	July 13, 2018	Haleakala	Pan-STARRS 1	·	2.2 km	MPC · JPL
719184	2018 NO_{42}	—	July 4, 2018	Haleakala	Pan-STARRS 2	(16286)	1.6 km	MPC · JPL
719185	2018 NP_{42}	—	July 12, 2018	Haleakala	Pan-STARRS 1	·	2.3 km	MPC · JPL
719186	2018 NQ_{42}	—	July 8, 2018	Haleakala	Pan-STARRS 1	·	1.3 km	MPC · JPL
719187	2018 NC_{43}	—	July 10, 2018	Haleakala	Pan-STARRS 1	VER	1.9 km	MPC · JPL
719188	2018 NX_{45}	—	July 9, 2018	Haleakala	Pan-STARRS 1	·	1.1 km	MPC · JPL
719189	2018 OK_{1}	—	April 29, 2008	Mount Lemmon	Mount Lemmon Survey	·	2.1 km	MPC · JPL
719190	2018 PO_{1}	—	December 9, 2015	Haleakala	Pan-STARRS 1	·	2.6 km	MPC · JPL
719191	2018 PO_{3}	—	September 15, 2013	Mount Lemmon	Mount Lemmon Survey	·	2.4 km	MPC · JPL
719192	2018 PN_{13}	—	October 23, 2009	Kitt Peak	Spacewatch	·	570 m	MPC · JPL
719193	2018 PE_{17}	—	April 20, 2017	Haleakala	Pan-STARRS 1	KOR	1.0 km	MPC · JPL
719194	2018 PL_{23}	—	August 12, 2018	Haleakala	Pan-STARRS 1	APO · PHA	380 m	MPC · JPL
719195	2018 PJ_{25}	—	April 26, 2017	Haleakala	Pan-STARRS 1	·	2.5 km	MPC · JPL
719196	2018 PP_{25}	—	November 19, 2008	Kitt Peak	Spacewatch	·	2.4 km	MPC · JPL
719197	2018 PE_{28}	—	March 1, 2016	Haleakala	Pan-STARRS 1	·	2.7 km	MPC · JPL
719198	2018 PU_{30}	—	November 19, 2015	Kitt Peak	Spacewatch	·	690 m	MPC · JPL
719199	2018 PE_{32}	—	September 25, 2013	Mount Lemmon	Mount Lemmon Survey	·	2.4 km	MPC · JPL
719200	2018 PB_{41}	—	December 22, 2008	Kitt Peak	Spacewatch	EOS	1.6 km	MPC · JPL

== 719201–719300 ==
back to top

Designation			Discovery			Properties		Ref
Permanent	Provisional	Named after	Date	Site	Discoverer(s)	Category	Diam.	Ref
719201	2018 PK_{42}	—	August 26, 2012	Haleakala	Pan-STARRS 1	·	2.6 km	MPC · JPL
719202	2018 PC_{44}	—	May 23, 2014	Haleakala	Pan-STARRS 1	·	560 m	MPC · JPL
719203	2018 PS_{47}	—	August 11, 2018	Haleakala	Pan-STARRS 1	·	510 m	MPC · JPL
719204	2018 PA_{56}	—	January 27, 2010	WISE	WISE	·	1.5 km	MPC · JPL
719205	2018 PP_{58}	—	August 8, 2018	Haleakala	Pan-STARRS 1	·	1.3 km	MPC · JPL
719206	2018 PS_{62}	—	August 4, 2018	XuYi	PMO NEO Survey Program	·	2.5 km	MPC · JPL
719207	2018 PE_{69}	—	August 14, 2018	Haleakala	Pan-STARRS 1	·	2.4 km	MPC · JPL
719208	2018 PJ_{69}	—	January 9, 2015	Haleakala	Pan-STARRS 1	·	1.4 km	MPC · JPL
719209	2018 PG_{78}	—	March 4, 2016	Haleakala	Pan-STARRS 1	·	2.3 km	MPC · JPL
719210	2018 QK_{2}	—	August 9, 2013	Kitt Peak	Spacewatch	·	2.1 km	MPC · JPL
719211	2018 QD_{4}	—	December 10, 2005	Catalina	CSS	PHO	1.4 km	MPC · JPL
719212	2018 QT_{6}	—	October 14, 2013	Nogales	M. Schwartz, P. R. Holvorcem	·	3.2 km	MPC · JPL
719213	2018 QF_{15}	—	July 29, 2005	Anderson Mesa	LONEOS	·	1.2 km	MPC · JPL
719214	2018 QK_{16}	—	August 18, 2018	Haleakala	Pan-STARRS 1	·	490 m	MPC · JPL
719215	2018 QZ_{17}	—	March 7, 2017	Haleakala	Pan-STARRS 1	·	560 m	MPC · JPL
719216	2018 RM_{11}	—	July 14, 2012	Mayhill-ISON	L. Elenin	·	3.0 km	MPC · JPL
719217	2018 RQ_{11}	—	October 31, 2008	Mount Lemmon	Mount Lemmon Survey	·	2.1 km	MPC · JPL
719218	2018 RT_{12}	—	September 13, 2007	Mount Lemmon	Mount Lemmon Survey	·	2.7 km	MPC · JPL
719219	2018 RC_{15}	—	January 17, 2015	Haleakala	Pan-STARRS 1	·	2.8 km	MPC · JPL
719220	2018 RK_{22}	—	June 18, 2018	Mount Lemmon	Mount Lemmon Survey	·	2.5 km	MPC · JPL
719221	2018 RP_{25}	—	October 16, 2001	Palomar	NEAT	·	2.7 km	MPC · JPL
719222	2018 RG_{49}	—	September 7, 2018	Mount Lemmon	Mount Lemmon Survey	·	460 m	MPC · JPL
719223	2018 SF_{7}	—	September 18, 1995	Kitt Peak	Spacewatch	·	3.6 km	MPC · JPL
719224	2018 SS_{8}	—	March 4, 2010	Kitt Peak	Spacewatch	·	1.7 km	MPC · JPL
719225	2018 SJ_{11}	—	October 5, 2013	Kitt Peak	Spacewatch	·	2.2 km	MPC · JPL
719226	2018 SX_{15}	—	March 30, 2016	Haleakala	Pan-STARRS 1	·	3.0 km	MPC · JPL
719227	2018 TU_{9}	—	October 5, 2018	Mount Lemmon	Mount Lemmon Survey	·	1.2 km	MPC · JPL
719228	2018 TE_{13}	—	October 24, 2011	Kitt Peak	Spacewatch	3:2 · SHU	4.6 km	MPC · JPL
719229	2018 TD_{28}	—	September 23, 2008	Mount Lemmon	Mount Lemmon Survey	·	490 m	MPC · JPL
719230	2018 TJ_{32}	—	October 15, 2018	Haleakala	Pan-STARRS 2	·	1.2 km	MPC · JPL
719231	2018 TN_{42}	—	January 13, 2015	Haleakala	Pan-STARRS 1	AGN	810 m	MPC · JPL
719232	2018 TM_{44}	—	October 2, 2018	Haleakala	Pan-STARRS 2	·	1.1 km	MPC · JPL
719233	2018 TP_{58}	—	November 26, 2014	Mount Lemmon	Mount Lemmon Survey	·	1.1 km	MPC · JPL
719234	2018 UM_{15}	—	December 11, 2004	Bergisch Gladbach	W. Bickel	NYS	800 m	MPC · JPL
719235	2018 UC_{16}	—	August 23, 2007	Kitt Peak	Spacewatch	·	850 m	MPC · JPL
719236	2018 UO_{34}	—	October 16, 2018	Haleakala	Pan-STARRS 2	·	510 m	MPC · JPL
719237	2018 UB_{42}	—	October 16, 2018	Haleakala	Pan-STARRS 2	·	1.4 km	MPC · JPL
719238	2018 VN_{14}	—	July 29, 2008	Mount Lemmon	Mount Lemmon Survey	·	520 m	MPC · JPL
719239	2018 VS_{14}	—	September 21, 2011	Haleakala	Pan-STARRS 1	·	810 m	MPC · JPL
719240	2018 VA_{16}	—	October 24, 2007	Mount Lemmon	Mount Lemmon Survey	·	2.8 km	MPC · JPL
719241	2018 VD_{21}	—	October 31, 2013	Kitt Peak	Spacewatch	·	2.5 km	MPC · JPL
719242	2018 VU_{23}	—	September 12, 2007	Mount Lemmon	Mount Lemmon Survey	·	940 m	MPC · JPL
719243	2018 VP_{25}	—	July 3, 2014	Haleakala	Pan-STARRS 1	·	980 m	MPC · JPL
719244	2018 VW_{41}	—	September 3, 2013	Haleakala	Pan-STARRS 1	·	1.4 km	MPC · JPL
719245	2018 VH_{50}	—	April 4, 2014	Haleakala	Pan-STARRS 1	·	950 m	MPC · JPL
719246	2018 VC_{51}	—	May 2, 2016	Haleakala	Pan-STARRS 1	·	1.2 km	MPC · JPL
719247	2018 VP_{57}	—	November 30, 2005	Kitt Peak	Spacewatch	·	530 m	MPC · JPL
719248	2018 VF_{63}	—	August 21, 2009	La Sagra	OAM	3:2	5.5 km	MPC · JPL
719249	2018 VG_{64}	—	January 20, 2015	Haleakala	Pan-STARRS 1	·	2.2 km	MPC · JPL
719250	2018 VX_{76}	—	July 1, 2014	Haleakala	Pan-STARRS 1	V	440 m	MPC · JPL
719251	2018 VV_{79}	—	January 3, 2016	Haleakala	Pan-STARRS 1	·	540 m	MPC · JPL
719252	2018 VD_{82}	—	July 28, 2014	Haleakala	Pan-STARRS 1	·	660 m	MPC · JPL
719253	2018 VX_{82}	—	December 30, 2007	Kitt Peak	Spacewatch	NYS	940 m	MPC · JPL
719254	2018 VT_{84}	—	November 15, 2007	Mount Lemmon	Mount Lemmon Survey	EOS	1.7 km	MPC · JPL
719255	2018 VL_{93}	—	November 7, 2007	Kitt Peak	Spacewatch	·	2.9 km	MPC · JPL
719256	2018 VQ_{94}	—	April 5, 2005	Mount Lemmon	Mount Lemmon Survey	NYS	810 m	MPC · JPL
719257	2018 VM_{107}	—	December 13, 2006	Kitt Peak	Spacewatch	·	940 m	MPC · JPL
719258	2018 VC_{122}	—	November 2, 2018	Haleakala	Pan-STARRS 2	·	3.2 km	MPC · JPL
719259	2018 VK_{122}	—	November 7, 2018	Mount Lemmon	Mount Lemmon Survey	·	1.9 km	MPC · JPL
719260	2018 VH_{128}	—	November 6, 2018	Haleakala	Pan-STARRS 2	·	2.0 km	MPC · JPL
719261	2018 VQ_{140}	—	August 18, 2017	Haleakala	Pan-STARRS 1	·	2.9 km	MPC · JPL
719262	2018 VH_{148}	—	November 1, 2018	Mount Lemmon	Mount Lemmon Survey	·	490 m	MPC · JPL
719263	2018 VY_{149}	—	November 2, 2018	Haleakala	Pan-STARRS 2	·	1.9 km	MPC · JPL
719264	2018 VN_{153}	—	November 1, 2018	Mount Lemmon	Mount Lemmon Survey	·	2.4 km	MPC · JPL
719265	2018 VL_{169}	—	November 9, 2018	Haleakala	Pan-STARRS 2	·	1.2 km	MPC · JPL
719266	2018 VF_{179}	—	October 16, 2012	Mount Lemmon	Mount Lemmon Survey	·	2.3 km	MPC · JPL
719267	2018 WP_{6}	—	November 29, 2018	Mount Lemmon	Mount Lemmon Survey	·	2.6 km	MPC · JPL
719268	2018 WU_{6}	—	November 16, 2018	Cerro Paranal	Altmann, M., Prusti, T.	VER	2.2 km	MPC · JPL
719269	2018 WB_{9}	—	April 21, 2015	Cerro Tololo	DECam	·	2.0 km	MPC · JPL
719270	2018 WB_{10}	—	July 25, 2014	Haleakala	Pan-STARRS 1	·	480 m	MPC · JPL
719271	2018 XB_{7}	—	September 25, 2000	Kitt Peak	Spacewatch	·	790 m	MPC · JPL
719272	2018 XE_{9}	—	March 17, 2012	Mount Lemmon	Mount Lemmon Survey	·	890 m	MPC · JPL
719273	2018 XW_{9}	—	September 19, 2014	Haleakala	Pan-STARRS 1	·	950 m	MPC · JPL
719274	2018 XR_{11}	—	December 21, 2014	Haleakala	Pan-STARRS 1	·	1.0 km	MPC · JPL
719275	2018 XS_{11}	—	August 1, 2017	Haleakala	Pan-STARRS 1	KOR	880 m	MPC · JPL
719276	2018 XY_{16}	—	February 12, 2016	Haleakala	Pan-STARRS 1	·	630 m	MPC · JPL
719277	2018 XB_{17}	—	January 24, 2014	Haleakala	Pan-STARRS 1	·	1.6 km	MPC · JPL
719278	2018 XR_{31}	—	December 4, 2018	Mount Lemmon	Mount Lemmon Survey	EOS	1.5 km	MPC · JPL
719279	2018 XK_{37}	—	September 25, 2013	Mount Lemmon	Mount Lemmon Survey	AEO	700 m	MPC · JPL
719280	2018 XZ_{46}	—	December 14, 2018	Haleakala	Pan-STARRS 1	·	990 m	MPC · JPL
719281	2018 YH_{3}	—	April 8, 2010	Kitt Peak	Spacewatch	PHO	950 m	MPC · JPL
719282	2018 YX_{3}	—	February 4, 2009	Mount Lemmon	Mount Lemmon Survey	(2076)	700 m	MPC · JPL
719283	2018 YB_{19}	—	December 31, 2018	Haleakala	Pan-STARRS 1	EOS	1.4 km	MPC · JPL
719284	2018 YB_{25}	—	December 17, 2018	Haleakala	Pan-STARRS 1	·	1.3 km	MPC · JPL
719285	2019 AS_{12}	—	January 2, 2019	Haleakala	Pan-STARRS 1	H	420 m	MPC · JPL
719286	2019 AF_{16}	—	April 13, 2015	Haleakala	Pan-STARRS 1	(21885)	2.6 km	MPC · JPL
719287	2019 AG_{17}	—	February 12, 2011	Catalina	CSS	·	1.4 km	MPC · JPL
719288	2019 AO_{20}	—	December 28, 2013	Mount Lemmon	Mount Lemmon Survey	·	2.1 km	MPC · JPL
719289	2019 AF_{22}	—	February 20, 2015	Haleakala	Pan-STARRS 1	·	2.1 km	MPC · JPL
719290	2019 AA_{29}	—	February 9, 2015	Mount Lemmon	Mount Lemmon Survey	·	1.3 km	MPC · JPL
719291	2019 AS_{32}	—	March 23, 2003	Kitt Peak	Spacewatch	·	2.8 km	MPC · JPL
719292	2019 AG_{37}	—	January 9, 2019	Haleakala	Pan-STARRS 1	·	1.9 km	MPC · JPL
719293	2019 AT_{41}	—	October 1, 2010	Mount Lemmon	Mount Lemmon Survey	·	880 m	MPC · JPL
719294	2019 AR_{50}	—	April 20, 2012	Mount Lemmon	Mount Lemmon Survey	·	890 m	MPC · JPL
719295	2019 AX_{54}	—	January 3, 2019	Haleakala	Pan-STARRS 1	·	560 m	MPC · JPL
719296	2019 AG_{55}	—	May 21, 2015	Cerro Tololo	DECam	·	1.4 km	MPC · JPL
719297	2019 AC_{68}	—	January 8, 2019	Haleakala	Pan-STARRS 1	·	1.0 km	MPC · JPL
719298	2019 AV_{73}	—	October 8, 2008	Mount Lemmon	Mount Lemmon Survey	·	1.2 km	MPC · JPL
719299	2019 AD_{79}	—	January 9, 2019	Haleakala	Pan-STARRS 1	·	1.3 km	MPC · JPL
719300	2019 AM_{80}	—	November 29, 2014	Haleakala	Pan-STARRS 1	·	1.0 km	MPC · JPL

== 719301–719400 ==
back to top

Designation			Discovery			Properties		Ref
Permanent	Provisional	Named after	Date	Site	Discoverer(s)	Category	Diam.	Ref
719301	2019 AT_{80}	—	November 5, 2007	Kitt Peak	Spacewatch	·	1.1 km	MPC · JPL
719302	2019 AH_{83}	—	January 3, 2019	Haleakala	Pan-STARRS 1	AGN	790 m	MPC · JPL
719303	2019 AN_{84}	—	July 26, 2017	Haleakala	Pan-STARRS 1	·	900 m	MPC · JPL
719304	2019 AV_{87}	—	January 9, 2019	Haleakala	Pan-STARRS 1	LEO	1.3 km	MPC · JPL
719305	2019 AQ_{96}	—	July 25, 2017	Haleakala	Pan-STARRS 1	·	820 m	MPC · JPL
719306	2019 AC_{100}	—	March 25, 2003	Mauna Kea	B. J. Gladman, J. J. Kavelaars	3:2	3.7 km	MPC · JPL
719307	2019 AC_{116}	—	January 8, 2019	Haleakala	Pan-STARRS 1	·	1.3 km	MPC · JPL
719308	2019 AV_{119}	—	January 3, 2019	Haleakala	Pan-STARRS 1	WIT	700 m	MPC · JPL
719309	2019 AW_{121}	—	January 3, 2019	Haleakala	Pan-STARRS 1	·	1.4 km	MPC · JPL
719310	2019 AS_{133}	—	November 4, 2005	Catalina	CSS	RAF	800 m	MPC · JPL
719311	2019 BE_{6}	—	March 2, 2015	Haleakala	Pan-STARRS 1	·	2.3 km	MPC · JPL
719312	2019 BO_{11}	—	December 25, 2010	Mount Lemmon	Mount Lemmon Survey	·	1 km	MPC · JPL
719313	2019 CZ_{7}	—	August 1, 2017	Haleakala	Pan-STARRS 1	·	1.0 km	MPC · JPL
719314	2019 CD_{9}	—	May 1, 2006	Catalina	CSS	·	640 m	MPC · JPL
719315	2019 CP_{9}	—	December 30, 2007	Mount Lemmon	Mount Lemmon Survey	ERI	1.6 km	MPC · JPL
719316	2019 CV_{10}	—	March 11, 2008	Mount Lemmon	Mount Lemmon Survey	V	620 m	MPC · JPL
719317	2019 CY_{12}	—	January 16, 2013	Mount Lemmon	Mount Lemmon Survey	·	1.7 km	MPC · JPL
719318	2019 CF_{13}	—	February 5, 2019	Haleakala	Pan-STARRS 1	·	1.4 km	MPC · JPL
719319	2019 CJ_{13}	—	February 4, 2019	Haleakala	Pan-STARRS 1	·	1.4 km	MPC · JPL
719320	2019 CG_{14}	—	February 5, 2019	Haleakala	Pan-STARRS 1	·	2.1 km	MPC · JPL
719321	2019 CM_{18}	—	October 27, 2017	Mount Lemmon	Mount Lemmon Survey	·	1.2 km	MPC · JPL
719322	2019 CM_{22}	—	March 15, 2015	Haleakala	Pan-STARRS 1	·	870 m	MPC · JPL
719323	2019 CU_{30}	—	February 4, 2019	Haleakala	Pan-STARRS 1	·	1.3 km	MPC · JPL
719324	2019 EA_{3}	—	April 15, 2008	Catalina	CSS	PHO	880 m	MPC · JPL
719325	2019 FW_{3}	—	October 8, 2008	Mount Lemmon	Mount Lemmon Survey	·	1.2 km	MPC · JPL
719326	2019 FC_{15}	—	May 20, 2015	Cerro Tololo	DECam	·	1.4 km	MPC · JPL
719327	2019 FH_{15}	—	March 29, 2019	Mount Lemmon	Mount Lemmon Survey	·	2.4 km	MPC · JPL
719328	2019 FS_{15}	—	April 29, 2014	Cerro Tololo	DECam	·	1.7 km	MPC · JPL
719329	2019 FV_{15}	—	March 29, 2019	Mount Lemmon	Mount Lemmon Survey	MRX	820 m	MPC · JPL
719330	2019 FE_{24}	—	March 31, 2019	Mount Lemmon	Mount Lemmon Survey	·	1.4 km	MPC · JPL
719331	2019 FN_{24}	—	December 15, 2009	Mauna Kea	Wiegert, P.	·	820 m	MPC · JPL
719332	2019 FM_{25}	—	September 5, 2016	Mount Lemmon	Mount Lemmon Survey	EOS	1.4 km	MPC · JPL
719333	2019 FN_{25}	—	March 29, 2019	Mount Lemmon	Mount Lemmon Survey	THM	1.9 km	MPC · JPL
719334	2019 FT_{28}	—	March 31, 2019	Mount Lemmon	Mount Lemmon Survey	AGN	870 m	MPC · JPL
719335	2019 FU_{29}	—	June 11, 2015	Haleakala	Pan-STARRS 1	·	1.2 km	MPC · JPL
719336	2019 FB_{30}	—	April 18, 2015	Cerro Tololo	DECam	·	1.4 km	MPC · JPL
719337	2019 FK_{37}	—	October 22, 2012	Haleakala	Pan-STARRS 1	·	1.3 km	MPC · JPL
719338	2019 GT_{8}	—	July 28, 2011	Haleakala	Pan-STARRS 1	·	1.5 km	MPC · JPL
719339	2019 GL_{14}	—	November 23, 2014	Mount Lemmon	Mount Lemmon Survey	L5	6.1 km	MPC · JPL
719340	2019 GM_{15}	—	February 4, 2019	Haleakala	Pan-STARRS 1	·	1.1 km	MPC · JPL
719341	2019 GE_{16}	—	October 27, 2005	Kitt Peak	Spacewatch	·	930 m	MPC · JPL
719342	2019 GT_{17}	—	January 27, 2012	Mount Lemmon	Mount Lemmon Survey	·	660 m	MPC · JPL
719343	2019 GX_{18}	—	December 6, 2015	Mount Lemmon	Mount Lemmon Survey	L5	9.6 km	MPC · JPL
719344	2019 GO_{32}	—	March 29, 2015	Haleakala	Pan-STARRS 1	·	1.7 km	MPC · JPL
719345	2019 GW_{41}	—	August 21, 2015	Haleakala	Pan-STARRS 1	·	2.0 km	MPC · JPL
719346	2019 GG_{42}	—	April 5, 2019	Haleakala	Pan-STARRS 1	ADE	1.3 km	MPC · JPL
719347	2019 GN_{43}	—	October 2, 2016	Mount Lemmon	Mount Lemmon Survey	·	1.4 km	MPC · JPL
719348	2019 GV_{43}	—	August 9, 2016	Haleakala	Pan-STARRS 1	·	1.0 km	MPC · JPL
719349	2019 GF_{44}	—	September 13, 2007	Kitt Peak	Spacewatch	·	1.5 km	MPC · JPL
719350	2019 GN_{44}	—	April 28, 2014	Cerro Tololo	DECam	EOS	1.1 km	MPC · JPL
719351	2019 GN_{45}	—	February 3, 2009	Kitt Peak	Spacewatch	·	1.5 km	MPC · JPL
719352	2019 GP_{45}	—	September 2, 2016	Mount Lemmon	Mount Lemmon Survey	·	1.4 km	MPC · JPL
719353	2019 GS_{49}	—	April 4, 2019	Haleakala	Pan-STARRS 1	·	1.2 km	MPC · JPL
719354	2019 GT_{49}	—	April 3, 2019	Haleakala	Pan-STARRS 1	·	1.2 km	MPC · JPL
719355	2019 GX_{49}	—	April 4, 2019	Haleakala	Pan-STARRS 1	·	1.4 km	MPC · JPL
719356	2019 GY_{49}	—	April 6, 2019	Haleakala	Pan-STARRS 1	·	1.1 km	MPC · JPL
719357	2019 GE_{51}	—	April 4, 2019	Haleakala	Pan-STARRS 1	·	1.3 km	MPC · JPL
719358	2019 GM_{51}	—	September 26, 2003	Apache Point	SDSS Collaboration	·	970 m	MPC · JPL
719359	2019 GT_{51}	—	May 26, 2010	WISE	WISE	·	1.5 km	MPC · JPL
719360	2019 GC_{52}	—	April 3, 2019	Haleakala	Pan-STARRS 1	ADE	1.3 km	MPC · JPL
719361	2019 GG_{52}	—	April 5, 2019	Haleakala	Pan-STARRS 1	·	1.9 km	MPC · JPL
719362	2019 GX_{52}	—	April 3, 2019	Haleakala	Pan-STARRS 1	·	1.4 km	MPC · JPL
719363	2019 GN_{53}	—	April 3, 2019	Haleakala	Pan-STARRS 1	·	1.3 km	MPC · JPL
719364	2019 GH_{55}	—	April 4, 2019	Haleakala	Pan-STARRS 1	·	1.2 km	MPC · JPL
719365	2019 GB_{59}	—	March 29, 2019	Mount Lemmon	Mount Lemmon Survey	·	2.2 km	MPC · JPL
719366	2019 GY_{59}	—	May 20, 2015	Cerro Tololo	DECam	·	1.1 km	MPC · JPL
719367	2019 GO_{63}	—	August 28, 2016	Mount Lemmon	Mount Lemmon Survey	·	1.2 km	MPC · JPL
719368	2019 GR_{67}	—	April 2, 2014	Mount Lemmon	Mount Lemmon Survey	AGN	880 m	MPC · JPL
719369	2019 GP_{69}	—	March 21, 2015	Haleakala	Pan-STARRS 1	·	880 m	MPC · JPL
719370	2019 GU_{69}	—	April 8, 2019	Haleakala	Pan-STARRS 1	·	1.5 km	MPC · JPL
719371	2019 GA_{74}	—	April 5, 2019	Haleakala	Pan-STARRS 1	·	1.5 km	MPC · JPL
719372	2019 GV_{81}	—	April 3, 2019	Haleakala	Pan-STARRS 1	·	1.5 km	MPC · JPL
719373	2019 GL_{83}	—	April 5, 2019	Happy Jack	Wasserman, L. H.	·	1.3 km	MPC · JPL
719374	2019 GR_{94}	—	April 3, 2019	Haleakala	Pan-STARRS 1	·	930 m	MPC · JPL
719375	2019 GB_{98}	—	April 5, 2019	Haleakala	Pan-STARRS 1	L5	8.0 km	MPC · JPL
719376	2019 GV_{99}	—	May 20, 2015	Cerro Tololo	DECam	·	1.2 km	MPC · JPL
719377	2019 GL_{103}	—	April 28, 2014	Cerro Tololo	DECam	EOS	1.2 km	MPC · JPL
719378	2019 GQ_{106}	—	April 8, 2019	Mount Lemmon	Mount Lemmon Survey	·	990 m	MPC · JPL
719379	2019 GZ_{107}	—	April 29, 2014	Cerro Tololo	DECam	·	2.1 km	MPC · JPL
719380	2019 GG_{111}	—	April 8, 2019	Haleakala	Pan-STARRS 1	AGN	810 m	MPC · JPL
719381	2019 GT_{112}	—	January 16, 2018	Haleakala	Pan-STARRS 1	KOR	1.0 km	MPC · JPL
719382	2019 GG_{114}	—	April 7, 2019	Haleakala	Pan-STARRS 1	·	1.4 km	MPC · JPL
719383	2019 GJ_{120}	—	April 3, 2019	Haleakala	Pan-STARRS 1	·	980 m	MPC · JPL
719384	2019 GK_{125}	—	September 9, 2004	Kitt Peak	Spacewatch	·	1.1 km	MPC · JPL
719385	2019 GR_{125}	—	April 3, 2019	Haleakala	Pan-STARRS 1	·	1.4 km	MPC · JPL
719386	2019 GO_{126}	—	April 9, 2019	Haleakala	Pan-STARRS 1	EUN	780 m	MPC · JPL
719387	2019 GD_{127}	—	November 1, 2000	Kitt Peak	Spacewatch	·	990 m	MPC · JPL
719388	2019 GA_{128}	—	April 6, 2019	Haleakala	Pan-STARRS 1	·	1.4 km	MPC · JPL
719389	2019 GB_{129}	—	April 5, 2019	Haleakala	Pan-STARRS 1	EUN	920 m	MPC · JPL
719390	2019 GG_{130}	—	April 17, 2015	Mount Lemmon	Mount Lemmon Survey	·	830 m	MPC · JPL
719391	2019 GL_{135}	—	April 7, 2019	Mount Lemmon	Mount Lemmon Survey	·	930 m	MPC · JPL
719392	2019 GW_{150}	—	August 2, 2011	Haleakala	Pan-STARRS 1	L5	6.4 km	MPC · JPL
719393	2019 GK_{174}	—	April 5, 2019	Haleakala	Pan-STARRS 1	·	1.3 km	MPC · JPL
719394	2019 GW_{185}	—	April 8, 2019	Haleakala	Pan-STARRS 1	·	2.0 km	MPC · JPL
719395	2019 HH_{1}	—	April 3, 2019	Haleakala	Pan-STARRS 1	·	1.3 km	MPC · JPL
719396	2019 HF_{8}	—	April 26, 2019	Mount Lemmon	Mount Lemmon Survey	MAS	520 m	MPC · JPL
719397	2019 HD_{11}	—	April 26, 2019	Mount Lemmon	Mount Lemmon Survey	·	1.7 km	MPC · JPL
719398	2019 HG_{12}	—	April 24, 2019	Haleakala	Pan-STARRS 1	·	1.1 km	MPC · JPL
719399	2019 JD_{10}	—	October 28, 2008	Kitt Peak	Spacewatch	·	990 m	MPC · JPL
719400	2019 JR_{11}	—	April 3, 2019	Haleakala	Pan-STARRS 1	·	970 m	MPC · JPL

== 719401–719500 ==
back to top

Designation			Discovery			Properties		Ref
Permanent	Provisional	Named after	Date	Site	Discoverer(s)	Category	Diam.	Ref
719401	2019 JE_{15}	—	November 21, 2017	Haleakala	Pan-STARRS 1	·	510 m	MPC · JPL
719402	2019 JV_{15}	—	February 6, 2007	Kitt Peak	Spacewatch	·	960 m	MPC · JPL
719403	2019 JJ_{19}	—	December 5, 2007	Kitt Peak	Spacewatch	·	1.2 km	MPC · JPL
719404	2019 JE_{20}	—	May 23, 2006	Kitt Peak	Spacewatch	·	1.2 km	MPC · JPL
719405	2019 JU_{21}	—	September 29, 2009	Mount Lemmon	Mount Lemmon Survey	·	3.2 km	MPC · JPL
719406	2019 JR_{23}	—	October 28, 2013	Mount Lemmon	Mount Lemmon Survey	·	580 m	MPC · JPL
719407	2019 JU_{23}	—	August 27, 2011	Haleakala	Pan-STARRS 1	·	1.5 km	MPC · JPL
719408	2019 JV_{23}	—	May 2, 2019	Mount Lemmon	Mount Lemmon Survey	·	1.5 km	MPC · JPL
719409	2019 JG_{32}	—	October 7, 2012	Haleakala	Pan-STARRS 1	·	990 m	MPC · JPL
719410	2019 JG_{34}	—	October 29, 2005	Mount Lemmon	Mount Lemmon Survey	MAS	630 m	MPC · JPL
719411	2019 JC_{38}	—	March 23, 2014	Mount Lemmon	Mount Lemmon Survey	·	1.5 km	MPC · JPL
719412	2019 JA_{40}	—	September 8, 2016	Haleakala	Pan-STARRS 1	·	1.1 km	MPC · JPL
719413	2019 JL_{41}	—	August 12, 2016	Haleakala	Pan-STARRS 1	BAR	970 m	MPC · JPL
719414	2019 JR_{41}	—	February 6, 2014	Mount Lemmon	Mount Lemmon Survey	·	1.0 km	MPC · JPL
719415	2019 JD_{43}	—	October 12, 2016	Haleakala	Pan-STARRS 1	·	1.2 km	MPC · JPL
719416	2019 JY_{43}	—	June 17, 2015	Haleakala	Pan-STARRS 1	·	1.3 km	MPC · JPL
719417	2019 JM_{46}	—	December 31, 2013	Mount Lemmon	Mount Lemmon Survey	EUN	930 m	MPC · JPL
719418	2019 JP_{47}	—	June 15, 2015	Haleakala	Pan-STARRS 1	·	1.5 km	MPC · JPL
719419	2019 JW_{48}	—	October 25, 2013	Kitt Peak	Spacewatch	V	590 m	MPC · JPL
719420	2019 JN_{50}	—	May 1, 2019	Haleakala	Pan-STARRS 1	·	830 m	MPC · JPL
719421	2019 JZ_{54}	—	October 9, 2007	Mount Lemmon	Mount Lemmon Survey	NEM	1.9 km	MPC · JPL
719422	2019 JE_{55}	—	December 21, 2006	Kitt Peak	Spacewatch	·	960 m	MPC · JPL
719423	2019 JA_{62}	—	May 9, 2019	Haleakala	Pan-STARRS 1	AGN	880 m	MPC · JPL
719424	2019 JB_{62}	—	May 1, 2019	Haleakala	Pan-STARRS 1	·	1.3 km	MPC · JPL
719425	2019 JR_{62}	—	April 24, 2014	Cerro Tololo	DECam	·	1.5 km	MPC · JPL
719426	2019 JS_{62}	—	May 8, 2019	Haleakala	Pan-STARRS 1	·	2.0 km	MPC · JPL
719427	2019 JT_{63}	—	May 7, 2019	Haleakala	Pan-STARRS 1	AGN	960 m	MPC · JPL
719428	2019 JA_{66}	—	May 1, 2019	Haleakala	Pan-STARRS 1	·	1.1 km	MPC · JPL
719429	2019 JX_{69}	—	April 24, 2014	Cerro Tololo	DECam	KOR	1.0 km	MPC · JPL
719430	2019 JF_{70}	—	May 3, 2019	Mount Lemmon	Mount Lemmon Survey	MAR	780 m	MPC · JPL
719431	2019 JL_{75}	—	May 9, 2019	Haleakala	Pan-STARRS 1	·	1.3 km	MPC · JPL
719432	2019 JR_{76}	—	May 8, 2019	Haleakala	Pan-STARRS 1	·	1.3 km	MPC · JPL
719433	2019 JS_{77}	—	May 1, 2019	Haleakala	Pan-STARRS 1	·	1.5 km	MPC · JPL
719434	2019 JJ_{81}	—	May 1, 2019	Haleakala	Pan-STARRS 1	·	530 m	MPC · JPL
719435	2019 JD_{88}	—	May 1, 2019	Haleakala	Pan-STARRS 1	·	1.3 km	MPC · JPL
719436	2019 JQ_{102}	—	May 20, 2015	Cerro Tololo	DECam	·	880 m	MPC · JPL
719437	2019 JV_{103}	—	May 8, 2019	Haleakala	Pan-STARRS 1	·	2.2 km	MPC · JPL
719438	2019 JZ_{106}	—	May 8, 2019	Haleakala	Pan-STARRS 1	·	1.1 km	MPC · JPL
719439	2019 JB_{112}	—	May 21, 2015	Cerro Tololo	DECam	·	800 m	MPC · JPL
719440	2019 JM_{123}	—	January 2, 2009	Kitt Peak	Spacewatch	·	1.4 km	MPC · JPL
719441	2019 KQ_{9}	—	May 28, 2019	Mount Lemmon	Mount Lemmon Survey	·	1.4 km	MPC · JPL
719442	2019 KX_{16}	—	May 13, 2015	Mount Lemmon	Mount Lemmon Survey	·	930 m	MPC · JPL
719443	2019 KP_{19}	—	May 30, 2019	Haleakala	Pan-STARRS 1	·	1.5 km	MPC · JPL
719444	2019 KQ_{19}	—	May 26, 2019	Haleakala	Pan-STARRS 1	·	1.4 km	MPC · JPL
719445	2019 KX_{19}	—	May 27, 2019	Haleakala	Pan-STARRS 1	·	1.3 km	MPC · JPL
719446	2019 KH_{20}	—	May 25, 2019	Haleakala	Pan-STARRS 1	·	1.6 km	MPC · JPL
719447	2019 KK_{20}	—	May 27, 2019	Haleakala	Pan-STARRS 1	·	1.7 km	MPC · JPL
719448	2019 KL_{26}	—	November 19, 2016	Mount Lemmon	Mount Lemmon Survey	·	1.3 km	MPC · JPL
719449	2019 KR_{26}	—	May 27, 2019	Haleakala	Pan-STARRS 1	·	1.6 km	MPC · JPL
719450	2019 KM_{27}	—	May 29, 2019	Haleakala	Pan-STARRS 1	·	1.3 km	MPC · JPL
719451	2019 KX_{33}	—	May 27, 2019	Haleakala	Pan-STARRS 1	·	1.4 km	MPC · JPL
719452	2019 KM_{34}	—	May 30, 2019	Haleakala	Pan-STARRS 1	·	1.1 km	MPC · JPL
719453	2019 KF_{35}	—	May 30, 2019	Haleakala	Pan-STARRS 1	·	1.9 km	MPC · JPL
719454	2019 KW_{45}	—	May 27, 2019	Haleakala	Pan-STARRS 1	WIT	710 m	MPC · JPL
719455	2019 KE_{50}	—	May 27, 2019	Haleakala	Pan-STARRS 1	·	1.5 km	MPC · JPL
719456	2019 KQ_{50}	—	June 26, 2015	Haleakala	Pan-STARRS 1	·	1.4 km	MPC · JPL
719457	2019 KD_{58}	—	November 16, 2011	Mount Lemmon	Mount Lemmon Survey	·	1.4 km	MPC · JPL
719458	2019 KD_{75}	—	July 25, 2015	Haleakala	Pan-STARRS 1	·	1.2 km	MPC · JPL
719459	2019 LD_{4}	—	January 31, 2009	Mount Lemmon	Mount Lemmon Survey	·	430 m	MPC · JPL
719460	2019 LR_{20}	—	June 10, 2019	Haleakala	Pan-STARRS 2	·	2.1 km	MPC · JPL
719461	2019 LY_{24}	—	June 12, 2019	Haleakala	Pan-STARRS 1	·	1.7 km	MPC · JPL
719462	2019 LC_{31}	—	June 3, 2019	Haleakala	Pan-STARRS 1	·	3.1 km	MPC · JPL
719463	2019 MY_{1}	—	January 15, 2008	Kitt Peak	Spacewatch	H	430 m	MPC · JPL
719464	2019 MJ_{7}	—	April 10, 2010	Kitt Peak	Spacewatch	·	1.7 km	MPC · JPL
719465	2019 MM_{11}	—	June 30, 2019	Haleakala	Pan-STARRS 1	·	1.5 km	MPC · JPL
719466	2019 MP_{11}	—	June 28, 2019	Haleakala	Pan-STARRS 1	·	2.3 km	MPC · JPL
719467	2019 MC_{12}	—	June 28, 2019	Haleakala	Pan-STARRS 1	MAS	600 m	MPC · JPL
719468	2019 MG_{12}	—	June 24, 2019	Palomar	Zwicky Transient Facility	H	420 m	MPC · JPL
719469	2019 MU_{12}	—	June 28, 2019	Mount Lemmon	Mount Lemmon Survey	·	2.5 km	MPC · JPL
719470	2019 MH_{13}	—	June 30, 2019	Haleakala	Pan-STARRS 1	·	1.6 km	MPC · JPL
719471	2019 MN_{13}	—	June 28, 2019	Haleakala	Pan-STARRS 1	·	1.3 km	MPC · JPL
719472	2019 MK_{15}	—	June 22, 2019	Haleakala	Pan-STARRS 1	EOS	1.6 km	MPC · JPL
719473	2019 ML_{15}	—	June 30, 2019	Haleakala	Pan-STARRS 1	EOS	1.3 km	MPC · JPL
719474	2019 MZ_{16}	—	June 28, 2019	Haleakala	Pan-STARRS 1	·	1.5 km	MPC · JPL
719475	2019 MS_{17}	—	June 28, 2019	Haleakala	Pan-STARRS 1	·	1.2 km	MPC · JPL
719476	2019 MV_{17}	—	June 30, 2019	Haleakala	Pan-STARRS 1	·	2.0 km	MPC · JPL
719477	2019 MS_{29}	—	June 29, 2019	Haleakala	Pan-STARRS 1	·	900 m	MPC · JPL
719478	2019 MU_{29}	—	June 29, 2019	Haleakala	Pan-STARRS 1	·	1.8 km	MPC · JPL
719479	2019 NE_{18}	—	October 26, 2009	Mount Lemmon	Mount Lemmon Survey	·	720 m	MPC · JPL
719480	2019 NR_{19}	—	August 28, 2005	Kitt Peak	Spacewatch	·	720 m	MPC · JPL
719481	2019 NB_{22}	—	September 20, 2014	Catalina	CSS	·	3.6 km	MPC · JPL
719482	2019 NN_{22}	—	May 29, 2008	Mount Lemmon	Mount Lemmon Survey	TIR	3.0 km	MPC · JPL
719483	2019 NU_{25}	—	December 26, 2017	Mount Lemmon	Mount Lemmon Survey	H	500 m	MPC · JPL
719484	2019 NB_{29}	—	January 18, 2016	Haleakala	Pan-STARRS 1	H	360 m	MPC · JPL
719485	2019 NN_{34}	—	September 2, 2008	Kitt Peak	Spacewatch	THM	1.7 km	MPC · JPL
719486	2019 NT_{36}	—	October 13, 2010	Mount Lemmon	Mount Lemmon Survey	AGN	1.1 km	MPC · JPL
719487	2019 NZ_{36}	—	May 5, 2014	Cerro Tololo	DECam	EUN	1.0 km	MPC · JPL
719488	2019 NJ_{37}	—	July 2, 2019	Haleakala	Pan-STARRS 1	·	1.9 km	MPC · JPL
719489	2019 NE_{38}	—	July 1, 2019	Haleakala	Pan-STARRS 1	·	1.4 km	MPC · JPL
719490	2019 NB_{39}	—	September 1, 2014	Mount Lemmon	Mount Lemmon Survey	EOS	1.4 km	MPC · JPL
719491	2019 NS_{42}	—	June 23, 2016	Haleakala	Pan-STARRS 1	H	520 m	MPC · JPL
719492	2019 NY_{53}	—	November 3, 2005	Mount Lemmon	Mount Lemmon Survey	·	1.6 km	MPC · JPL
719493	2019 NF_{54}	—	July 2, 2019	Haleakala	Pan-STARRS 1	EOS	1.4 km	MPC · JPL
719494	2019 NC_{58}	—	July 7, 2019	Haleakala	Pan-STARRS 1	·	1.3 km	MPC · JPL
719495	2019 NJ_{58}	—	July 4, 2019	Haleakala	Pan-STARRS 1	KOR	1.1 km	MPC · JPL
719496	2019 NB_{60}	—	July 7, 2019	Haleakala	Pan-STARRS 1	·	2.1 km	MPC · JPL
719497	2019 NH_{64}	—	March 21, 2017	Haleakala	Pan-STARRS 1	·	1.8 km	MPC · JPL
719498	2019 NV_{64}	—	July 4, 2019	Haleakala	Pan-STARRS 1	·	1.6 km	MPC · JPL
719499	2019 NR_{71}	—	July 1, 2019	Haleakala	Pan-STARRS 1	·	2.2 km	MPC · JPL
719500	2019 NX_{71}	—	July 1, 2019	Haleakala	Pan-STARRS 1	L4	7.1 km	MPC · JPL

== 719501–719600 ==
back to top

Designation			Discovery			Properties		Ref
Permanent	Provisional	Named after	Date	Site	Discoverer(s)	Category	Diam.	Ref
719501	2019 NS_{81}	—	July 4, 2019	Haleakala	Pan-STARRS 1	EOS	1.5 km	MPC · JPL
719502	2019 NH_{82}	—	July 4, 2019	Haleakala	Pan-STARRS 1	·	1.6 km	MPC · JPL
719503	2019 OA_{7}	—	January 30, 2006	Kitt Peak	Spacewatch	·	2.1 km	MPC · JPL
719504	2019 OL_{8}	—	August 25, 2014	Haleakala	Pan-STARRS 1	EOS	1.4 km	MPC · JPL
719505	2019 OF_{9}	—	November 7, 2015	Mount Lemmon	Mount Lemmon Survey	KOR	1 km	MPC · JPL
719506	2019 OQ_{13}	—	February 5, 2011	Catalina	CSS	EOS	1.7 km	MPC · JPL
719507	2019 OY_{17}	—	July 30, 2005	Palomar	NEAT	·	1.7 km	MPC · JPL
719508	2019 OZ_{22}	—	November 11, 2004	Kitt Peak	Spacewatch	·	2.7 km	MPC · JPL
719509	2019 OO_{23}	—	June 6, 2019	Mount Lemmon	Mount Lemmon Survey	·	1.7 km	MPC · JPL
719510	2019 OP_{23}	—	July 30, 2019	Haleakala	Pan-STARRS 1	·	790 m	MPC · JPL
719511	2019 OB_{25}	—	October 2, 2008	Mount Lemmon	Mount Lemmon Survey	·	1.0 km	MPC · JPL
719512	2019 OR_{28}	—	July 28, 2019	Haleakala	Pan-STARRS 2	·	3.0 km	MPC · JPL
719513	2019 OL_{33}	—	July 30, 2019	Haleakala	Pan-STARRS 1	L4	6.1 km	MPC · JPL
719514	2019 ON_{33}	—	July 30, 2019	Haleakala	Pan-STARRS 2	EOS	1.4 km	MPC · JPL
719515	2019 OF_{39}	—	April 3, 2016	Haleakala	Pan-STARRS 1	L4 · ERY	6.1 km	MPC · JPL
719516	2019 OQ_{40}	—	March 28, 2008	Mount Lemmon	Mount Lemmon Survey	·	1.3 km	MPC · JPL
719517	2019 PV_{6}	—	February 26, 2011	Mount Lemmon	Mount Lemmon Survey	·	2.6 km	MPC · JPL
719518	2019 PX_{6}	—	January 10, 2013	Haleakala	Pan-STARRS 1	·	940 m	MPC · JPL
719519	2019 PZ_{6}	—	August 8, 2019	Haleakala	Pan-STARRS 2	·	1.4 km	MPC · JPL
719520	2019 PH_{7}	—	April 15, 2012	Haleakala	Pan-STARRS 1	·	1.7 km	MPC · JPL
719521	2019 PE_{12}	—	March 30, 2015	Haleakala	Pan-STARRS 1	MAS	650 m	MPC · JPL
719522	2019 PP_{24}	—	December 14, 2015	Haleakala	Pan-STARRS 1	·	2.6 km	MPC · JPL
719523	2019 PK_{25}	—	March 24, 2012	Mount Lemmon	Mount Lemmon Survey	·	1.9 km	MPC · JPL
719524	2019 PE_{29}	—	March 26, 2007	Mount Lemmon	Mount Lemmon Survey	(6769)	1.1 km	MPC · JPL
719525	2019 PY_{29}	—	June 3, 2014	Haleakala	Pan-STARRS 1	·	3.2 km	MPC · JPL
719526	2019 PQ_{32}	—	August 4, 2019	Haleakala	Pan-STARRS 1	·	3.2 km	MPC · JPL
719527	2019 PM_{34}	—	August 8, 2019	Haleakala	Pan-STARRS 1	·	1.3 km	MPC · JPL
719528	2019 PY_{45}	—	August 8, 2019	Haleakala	Pan-STARRS 1	EOS	1.3 km	MPC · JPL
719529	2019 PL_{53}	—	August 8, 2019	Haleakala	Pan-STARRS 1	EOS	1.3 km	MPC · JPL
719530	2019 PV_{75}	—	January 7, 2006	Kitt Peak	Spacewatch	·	1.4 km	MPC · JPL
719531	2019 QB_{8}	—	April 18, 2015	Cerro Tololo	DECam	L4 · 006	7.3 km	MPC · JPL
719532	2019 QX_{9}	—	March 24, 2012	Mount Lemmon	Mount Lemmon Survey	·	1.7 km	MPC · JPL
719533	2019 QH_{11}	—	December 4, 2015	Haleakala	Pan-STARRS 1	·	1.4 km	MPC · JPL
719534	2019 QH_{13}	—	August 27, 2019	Haleakala	Pan-STARRS 2	·	2.2 km	MPC · JPL
719535	2019 QG_{25}	—	September 18, 2003	Kitt Peak	Spacewatch	·	1.9 km	MPC · JPL
719536	2019 QU_{26}	—	February 21, 2007	Mount Lemmon	Mount Lemmon Survey	NYS	1.1 km	MPC · JPL
719537	2019 QP_{30}	—	August 24, 2019	Haleakala	Pan-STARRS 1	·	2.1 km	MPC · JPL
719538	2019 QT_{30}	—	August 22, 2019	Haleakala	Pan-STARRS 1	·	2.0 km	MPC · JPL
719539	2019 QY_{30}	—	August 31, 2019	Haleakala	Pan-STARRS 1	·	1.7 km	MPC · JPL
719540	2019 QD_{41}	—	April 14, 2013	ESA OGS	ESA OGS	·	1.5 km	MPC · JPL
719541	2019 QX_{45}	—	February 7, 2008	Mount Lemmon	Mount Lemmon Survey	·	1.2 km	MPC · JPL
719542	2019 QD_{70}	—	August 29, 2019	Haleakala	Pan-STARRS 1	L4 · ERY	5.3 km	MPC · JPL
719543	2019 QW_{109}	—	August 28, 2019	Haleakala	Pan-STARRS 1	3:2	4.0 km	MPC · JPL
719544	2019 QR_{113}	—	August 31, 2019	Haleakala	Pan-STARRS 1	·	2.0 km	MPC · JPL
719545	2019 RS_{4}	—	September 24, 2003	Haleakala	NEAT	T_{j} (2.99)	3.1 km	MPC · JPL
719546	2019 RE_{5}	—	November 17, 2014	Haleakala	Pan-STARRS 1	·	3.1 km	MPC · JPL
719547	2019 RA_{15}	—	September 5, 2019	Mount Lemmon	Mount Lemmon Survey	·	2.2 km	MPC · JPL
719548	2019 RU_{17}	—	October 20, 1998	Kitt Peak	Spacewatch	·	2.2 km	MPC · JPL
719549	2019 RU_{24}	—	September 21, 2008	Kitt Peak	Spacewatch	·	1.9 km	MPC · JPL
719550	2019 RZ_{26}	—	September 22, 2008	Kitt Peak	Spacewatch	·	2.3 km	MPC · JPL
719551	2019 RF_{28}	—	September 6, 2019	Haleakala	Pan-STARRS 1	·	1.1 km	MPC · JPL
719552	2019 RL_{28}	—	September 4, 2019	Mount Lemmon	Mount Lemmon Survey	·	1.9 km	MPC · JPL
719553	2019 RV_{28}	—	September 4, 2019	Mount Lemmon	Mount Lemmon Survey	·	2.3 km	MPC · JPL
719554	2019 RE_{51}	—	September 6, 2019	Haleakala	Pan-STARRS 1	THM	1.7 km	MPC · JPL
719555	2019 RY_{62}	—	September 4, 2019	Haleakala	Pan-STARRS 1	·	1.7 km	MPC · JPL
719556	2019 RH_{72}	—	October 8, 2008	Mount Lemmon	Mount Lemmon Survey	ELF	2.6 km	MPC · JPL
719557	2019 RJ_{74}	—	September 7, 2019	Mount Lemmon	Mount Lemmon Survey	L4	5.6 km	MPC · JPL
719558	2019 RF_{77}	—	September 1, 2019	Cerro Tololo	DECam	L4	5.7 km	MPC · JPL
719559	2019 RE_{82}	—	November 17, 2014	Mount Lemmon	Mount Lemmon Survey	·	2.1 km	MPC · JPL
719560	2019 RJ_{83}	—	September 5, 2019	Mount Lemmon	Mount Lemmon Survey	·	1.9 km	MPC · JPL
719561	2019 RH_{84}	—	August 3, 2014	Haleakala	Pan-STARRS 1	·	1.6 km	MPC · JPL
719562	2019 RJ_{84}	—	September 6, 2019	Haleakala	Pan-STARRS 1	·	1.8 km	MPC · JPL
719563	2019 SV_{16}	—	October 29, 2008	Catalina	CSS	H	520 m	MPC · JPL
719564	2019 SZ_{22}	—	September 23, 2008	Mount Lemmon	Mount Lemmon Survey	·	3.0 km	MPC · JPL
719565	2019 SX_{23}	—	September 24, 2019	Haleakala	Pan-STARRS 1	·	2.3 km	MPC · JPL
719566	2019 SS_{29}	—	September 2, 2008	La Sagra	OAM	·	2.5 km	MPC · JPL
719567	2019 SZ_{48}	—	March 28, 2012	Kitt Peak	Spacewatch	·	2.9 km	MPC · JPL
719568	2019 SQ_{57}	—	January 15, 2018	Mount Lemmon	Mount Lemmon Survey	H	420 m	MPC · JPL
719569	2019 SH_{63}	—	August 24, 2008	Kitt Peak	Spacewatch	·	2.3 km	MPC · JPL
719570	2019 SO_{66}	—	January 4, 2013	Cerro Tololo	DECam	·	1.1 km	MPC · JPL
719571	2019 SY_{75}	—	February 8, 2011	Mount Lemmon	Mount Lemmon Survey	EOS	1.5 km	MPC · JPL
719572	2019 SD_{82}	—	September 30, 2019	Haleakala	Pan-STARRS 1	·	3.4 km	MPC · JPL
719573	2019 SC_{83}	—	September 28, 2019	Mount Lemmon	Mount Lemmon Survey	·	2.2 km	MPC · JPL
719574	2019 SP_{83}	—	September 29, 2019	Haleakala	Pan-STARRS 1	H	330 m	MPC · JPL
719575	2019 SR_{84}	—	September 24, 2019	Haleakala	Pan-STARRS 1	·	2.0 km	MPC · JPL
719576	2019 SC_{93}	—	February 5, 2011	Haleakala	Pan-STARRS 1	·	2.2 km	MPC · JPL
719577	2019 SJ_{104}	—	October 10, 2008	Mount Lemmon	Mount Lemmon Survey	·	2.3 km	MPC · JPL
719578	2019 SJ_{122}	—	October 14, 2014	Mount Lemmon	Mount Lemmon Survey	·	1.5 km	MPC · JPL
719579	2019 SL_{124}	—	April 5, 2014	Haleakala	Pan-STARRS 1	·	790 m	MPC · JPL
719580	2019 SF_{146}	—	January 16, 2008	Kitt Peak	Spacewatch	·	870 m	MPC · JPL
719581	2019 SO_{150}	—	September 29, 2019	Mount Lemmon	Mount Lemmon Survey	·	2.0 km	MPC · JPL
719582	2019 SB_{178}	—	May 21, 2010	Mount Lemmon	Mount Lemmon Survey	·	3.2 km	MPC · JPL
719583	2019 SE_{180}	—	September 20, 2019	Mount Lemmon	Mount Lemmon Survey	EOS	1.4 km	MPC · JPL
719584	2019 SU_{183}	—	September 30, 2019	Mount Lemmon	Mount Lemmon Survey	·	2.4 km	MPC · JPL
719585	2019 SG_{184}	—	September 26, 2019	Haleakala	Pan-STARRS 1	·	2.6 km	MPC · JPL
719586	2019 SD_{188}	—	September 22, 2019	Haleakala	Pan-STARRS 1	·	2.0 km	MPC · JPL
719587	2019 SG_{188}	—	September 21, 2019	Mount Lemmon	Mount Lemmon Survey	·	1.9 km	MPC · JPL
719588	2019 TF_{34}	—	October 9, 2019	Mount Lemmon	Mount Lemmon Survey	EOS	1.4 km	MPC · JPL
719589	2019 TG_{34}	—	October 7, 2019	Haleakala	Pan-STARRS 1	EOS	1.6 km	MPC · JPL
719590	2019 TS_{34}	—	October 9, 2019	Mount Lemmon	Mount Lemmon Survey	·	2.4 km	MPC · JPL
719591	2019 TW_{34}	—	October 8, 2019	Haleakala	Pan-STARRS 1	·	1.5 km	MPC · JPL
719592	2019 TN_{35}	—	October 1, 2019	Mount Lemmon	Mount Lemmon Survey	THM	1.7 km	MPC · JPL
719593	2019 TZ_{37}	—	October 3, 2019	Mount Lemmon	Mount Lemmon Survey	VER	2.0 km	MPC · JPL
719594	2019 TG_{69}	—	October 5, 2019	Haleakala	Pan-STARRS 1	SYL	2.9 km	MPC · JPL
719595	2019 TS_{69}	—	October 9, 2019	Haleakala	Pan-STARRS 1	·	2.6 km	MPC · JPL
719596	2019 TM_{70}	—	October 9, 2019	Mount Lemmon	Mount Lemmon Survey	·	1.2 km	MPC · JPL
719597	2019 TR_{74}	—	October 5, 2019	Haleakala	Pan-STARRS 1	·	1.1 km	MPC · JPL
719598	2019 UZ_{14}	—	December 11, 2009	Mount Lemmon	Mount Lemmon Survey	·	2.1 km	MPC · JPL
719599	2019 UA_{23}	—	February 13, 2004	Kitt Peak	Spacewatch	·	2.7 km	MPC · JPL
719600	2019 UU_{24}	—	August 31, 2013	Črni Vrh	Skvarč, J.	·	2.9 km	MPC · JPL

== 719601–719700 ==
back to top

Designation			Discovery			Properties		Ref
Permanent	Provisional	Named after	Date	Site	Discoverer(s)	Category	Diam.	Ref
719601	2019 UJ_{33}	—	October 24, 2019	Mount Lemmon	Mount Lemmon Survey	·	2.4 km	MPC · JPL
719602	2019 UK_{33}	—	October 22, 2019	Mount Lemmon	Mount Lemmon Survey	·	2.7 km	MPC · JPL
719603	2019 UR_{33}	—	October 23, 2019	Haleakala	Pan-STARRS 1	·	2.0 km	MPC · JPL
719604	2019 UX_{36}	—	October 26, 2013	Kitt Peak	Spacewatch	·	2.9 km	MPC · JPL
719605	2019 UD_{38}	—	October 25, 2019	Haleakala	Pan-STARRS 1	·	2.6 km	MPC · JPL
719606	2019 UU_{40}	—	March 14, 2012	Mount Lemmon	Mount Lemmon Survey	·	1.9 km	MPC · JPL
719607	2019 UR_{48}	—	October 22, 2019	Mount Lemmon	Mount Lemmon Survey	·	480 m	MPC · JPL
719608	2019 UM_{76}	—	July 15, 2013	Haleakala	Pan-STARRS 1	·	2.1 km	MPC · JPL
719609	2019 UU_{91}	—	October 23, 2019	Mount Lemmon	Mount Lemmon Survey	·	1.7 km	MPC · JPL
719610	2019 UQ_{136}	—	October 23, 2019	Haleakala	Pan-STARRS 1	·	1.3 km	MPC · JPL
719611	2019 UG_{157}	—	November 17, 2014	Haleakala	Pan-STARRS 1	KOR	870 m	MPC · JPL
719612 Hoshizaki	2019 UW_{157}	Hoshizaki	October 27, 2019	Mauna Kea	COIAS	·	880 m	MPC · JPL
719613	2019 VZ_{5}	—	August 10, 2015	Haleakala	Pan-STARRS 1	T_{j} (2.94) · 3:2	6.7 km	MPC · JPL
719614	2019 VA_{7}	—	March 7, 2016	Haleakala	Pan-STARRS 1	·	2.0 km	MPC · JPL
719615	2019 VK_{8}	—	November 2, 2019	Haleakala	Pan-STARRS 2	·	2.5 km	MPC · JPL
719616	2019 VW_{18}	—	April 28, 2014	Cerro Tololo	DECam	·	640 m	MPC · JPL
719617	2019 VX_{23}	—	November 8, 2019	Mount Lemmon	Mount Lemmon Survey	(69559)	2.8 km	MPC · JPL
719618	2019 VH_{24}	—	April 3, 2016	Haleakala	Pan-STARRS 1	·	2.0 km	MPC · JPL
719619	2019 VU_{31}	—	November 8, 2019	Mount Lemmon	Mount Lemmon Survey	EOS	1.5 km	MPC · JPL
719620	2019 WR_{1}	—	October 18, 2018	Haleakala	Pan-STARRS 2	T_{j} (2.31)	6.1 km	MPC · JPL
719621	2019 WH_{19}	—	January 26, 2012	Haleakala	Pan-STARRS 1	·	1.1 km	MPC · JPL
719622	2019 XE_{12}	—	December 3, 2019	Mount Lemmon	Mount Lemmon Survey	V	460 m	MPC · JPL
719623	2019 XV_{14}	—	September 23, 2008	Mount Lemmon	Mount Lemmon Survey	·	1.8 km	MPC · JPL
719624	2019 YZ_{7}	—	December 27, 2019	Haleakala	Pan-STARRS 1	·	830 m	MPC · JPL
719625	2020 AE_{4}	—	September 27, 1995	Kitt Peak	Spacewatch	·	1.3 km	MPC · JPL
719626	2020 AH_{4}	—	January 1, 2020	Haleakala	Pan-STARRS 1	·	770 m	MPC · JPL
719627	2020 AO_{8}	—	November 12, 2018	Haleakala	Pan-STARRS 2	·	2.2 km	MPC · JPL
719628	2020 BL_{17}	—	February 26, 2011	Mount Lemmon	Mount Lemmon Survey	·	1.3 km	MPC · JPL
719629	2020 BT_{50}	—	August 10, 2010	Kitt Peak	Spacewatch	·	950 m	MPC · JPL
719630	2020 BQ_{57}	—	January 30, 2006	Kitt Peak	Spacewatch	·	1.5 km	MPC · JPL
719631	2020 BX_{62}	—	January 23, 2020	Haleakala	Pan-STARRS 1	·	1.5 km	MPC · JPL
719632	2020 BA_{74}	—	November 10, 2018	Mount Lemmon	Mount Lemmon Survey	·	2.4 km	MPC · JPL
719633	2020 BG_{76}	—	November 10, 2018	Mount Lemmon	Mount Lemmon Survey	EOS	1.4 km	MPC · JPL
719634	2020 BT_{78}	—	January 26, 2020	Haleakala	Pan-STARRS 2	·	2.5 km	MPC · JPL
719635	2020 BZ_{78}	—	April 20, 2010	Kitt Peak	Spacewatch	·	2.6 km	MPC · JPL
719636	2020 BY_{79}	—	April 10, 2016	Haleakala	Pan-STARRS 1	·	2.2 km	MPC · JPL
719637	2020 BN_{82}	—	September 1, 2013	Haleakala	Pan-STARRS 1	·	1.6 km	MPC · JPL
719638	2020 DT_{15}	—	February 27, 2020	Mount Lemmon	Mount Lemmon Survey	·	1.9 km	MPC · JPL
719639	2020 DK_{20}	—	February 16, 2020	Mount Lemmon	Mount Lemmon Survey	·	610 m	MPC · JPL
719640	2020 FK_{8}	—	September 16, 2017	Haleakala	Pan-STARRS 1	·	830 m	MPC · JPL
719641	2020 FW_{8}	—	March 21, 2020	Haleakala	Pan-STARRS 2	·	580 m	MPC · JPL
719642	2020 FX_{8}	—	March 21, 2020	Haleakala	Pan-STARRS 1	L5	6.0 km	MPC · JPL
719643	2020 FX_{10}	—	March 16, 2020	Mount Lemmon	Mount Lemmon Survey	·	690 m	MPC · JPL
719644	2020 FA_{14}	—	October 12, 2007	Kitt Peak	Spacewatch	·	610 m	MPC · JPL
719645	2020 FM_{32}	—	August 30, 2017	Haleakala	Pan-STARRS 1	·	920 m	MPC · JPL
719646	2020 FV_{34}	—	March 22, 2020	Haleakala	Pan-STARRS 1	·	1.1 km	MPC · JPL
719647	2020 FL_{37}	—	March 21, 2020	Haleakala	Pan-STARRS 1	L5	6.3 km	MPC · JPL
719648	2020 FJ_{41}	—	March 16, 2020	Mount Lemmon	Mount Lemmon Survey	·	2.5 km	MPC · JPL
719649	2020 GJ_{8}	—	April 15, 2020	Mount Lemmon	Mount Lemmon Survey	EOS	1.2 km	MPC · JPL
719650	2020 GU_{8}	—	April 2, 2020	Mount Lemmon	Mount Lemmon Survey	HYG	2.3 km	MPC · JPL
719651	2020 GV_{8}	—	September 17, 2017	Haleakala	Pan-STARRS 1	·	1.3 km	MPC · JPL
719652	2020 GW_{20}	—	February 11, 2016	Haleakala	Pan-STARRS 1	V	500 m	MPC · JPL
719653	2020 GN_{22}	—	April 22, 2007	Kitt Peak	Spacewatch	·	1.2 km	MPC · JPL
719654	2020 GC_{23}	—	September 5, 2000	Apache Point	SDSS Collaboration	L5	7.5 km	MPC · JPL
719655	2020 HJ_{11}	—	April 24, 2020	Mount Lemmon	Mount Lemmon Survey	·	1.1 km	MPC · JPL
719656	2020 HM_{11}	—	October 2, 2014	Haleakala	Pan-STARRS 1	·	670 m	MPC · JPL
719657	2020 HO_{13}	—	April 2, 2009	Mount Lemmon	Mount Lemmon Survey	·	740 m	MPC · JPL
719658	2020 HB_{16}	—	November 1, 2013	Mount Lemmon	Mount Lemmon Survey	L5	6.7 km	MPC · JPL
719659	2020 HT_{18}	—	September 3, 2010	Mount Lemmon	Mount Lemmon Survey	·	590 m	MPC · JPL
719660	2020 HU_{20}	—	February 11, 2008	Mount Lemmon	Mount Lemmon Survey	·	2.3 km	MPC · JPL
719661	2020 HK_{22}	—	October 30, 2017	Haleakala	Pan-STARRS 1	EUP	2.2 km	MPC · JPL
719662	2020 HM_{24}	—	October 13, 2010	Mount Lemmon	Mount Lemmon Survey	·	960 m	MPC · JPL
719663	2020 HC_{25}	—	December 29, 2011	Mount Lemmon	Mount Lemmon Survey	·	830 m	MPC · JPL
719664	2020 HS_{34}	—	April 18, 2020	Haleakala	Pan-STARRS 2	L5	6.4 km	MPC · JPL
719665	2020 HX_{35}	—	January 18, 2016	Haleakala	Pan-STARRS 1	·	810 m	MPC · JPL
719666	2020 HA_{55}	—	February 9, 1999	Kitt Peak	Spacewatch	·	650 m	MPC · JPL
719667	2020 HO_{65}	—	April 16, 2020	Mount Lemmon	Mount Lemmon Survey	L5	6.3 km	MPC · JPL
719668	2020 HJ_{83}	—	May 25, 2007	Mount Lemmon	Mount Lemmon Survey	·	1.3 km	MPC · JPL
719669	2020 HF_{88}	—	April 6, 2019	Haleakala	Pan-STARRS 1	L5	6.7 km	MPC · JPL
719670	2020 HO_{108}	—	March 2, 2006	Kitt Peak	Spacewatch	·	1.3 km	MPC · JPL
719671	2020 HN_{109}	—	May 21, 2015	Cerro Tololo	DECam	·	1.1 km	MPC · JPL
719672	2020 HQ_{113}	—	October 10, 2015	Haleakala	Pan-STARRS 1	L5	6.0 km	MPC · JPL
719673	2020 HK_{116}	—	April 21, 2020	Haleakala	Pan-STARRS 1	L5	5.5 km	MPC · JPL
719674	2020 HZ_{116}	—	April 23, 2020	Mount Lemmon	Mount Lemmon Survey	L5	5.5 km	MPC · JPL
719675	2020 HT_{128}	—	April 27, 2020	Haleakala	Pan-STARRS 1	KOR	980 m	MPC · JPL
719676	2020 HU_{135}	—	April 20, 2020	Haleakala	Pan-STARRS 1	·	1.2 km	MPC · JPL
719677	2020 HM_{140}	—	November 17, 2014	Haleakala	Pan-STARRS 1	L5	6.2 km	MPC · JPL
719678	2020 HW_{142}	—	January 17, 2015	Haleakala	Pan-STARRS 1	·	970 m	MPC · JPL
719679	2020 HA_{160}	—	October 6, 2013	Kitt Peak	Spacewatch	L5	6.4 km	MPC · JPL
719680	2020 HG_{160}	—	April 4, 2019	Haleakala	Pan-STARRS 1	L5	7.0 km	MPC · JPL
719681	2020 HB_{165}	—	February 13, 2015	Mount Lemmon	Mount Lemmon Survey	WIT	710 m	MPC · JPL
719682	2020 HQ_{179}	—	April 19, 2020	Haleakala	Pan-STARRS 1	L5	6.4 km	MPC · JPL
719683	2020 JA_{7}	—	April 21, 2009	Mount Lemmon	Mount Lemmon Survey	·	940 m	MPC · JPL
719684	2020 JC_{10}	—	November 17, 2017	Haleakala	Pan-STARRS 1	·	960 m	MPC · JPL
719685	2020 JV_{15}	—	May 15, 2020	Haleakala	Pan-STARRS 1	EOS	1.5 km	MPC · JPL
719686	2020 JW_{17}	—	November 29, 2014	Mount Lemmon	Mount Lemmon Survey	·	850 m	MPC · JPL
719687	2020 JM_{21}	—	May 14, 2020	Haleakala	Pan-STARRS 1	·	3.0 km	MPC · JPL
719688	2020 JG_{28}	—	May 14, 2020	Haleakala	Pan-STARRS 1	AGN	810 m	MPC · JPL
719689	2020 JO_{35}	—	March 7, 2018	Haleakala	Pan-STARRS 1	L5	7.2 km	MPC · JPL
719690	2020 JG_{46}	—	May 13, 2020	Haleakala	Pan-STARRS 1	KOR	1.0 km	MPC · JPL
719691	2020 KW_{10}	—	December 24, 2014	Mount Lemmon	Mount Lemmon Survey	PHO	880 m	MPC · JPL
719692	2020 KY_{17}	—	May 26, 2020	Mount Lemmon	Mount Lemmon Survey	·	1.7 km	MPC · JPL
719693	2020 KL_{24}	—	May 20, 2020	Haleakala	Pan-STARRS 1	KOR	1.2 km	MPC · JPL
719694	2020 KN_{24}	—	April 19, 2009	Mauna Kea	Wiegert, P.	EOS	1.3 km	MPC · JPL
719695	2020 KS_{37}	—	May 23, 2020	Haleakala	Pan-STARRS 1	KOR	1.1 km	MPC · JPL
719696	2020 KH_{38}	—	May 12, 2015	Mount Lemmon	Mount Lemmon Survey	KOR	990 m	MPC · JPL
719697	2020 KD_{40}	—	July 3, 2016	Mount Lemmon	Mount Lemmon Survey	AGN	820 m	MPC · JPL
719698	2020 KW_{41}	—	February 3, 2012	Haleakala	Pan-STARRS 1	·	760 m	MPC · JPL
719699	2020 LH_{10}	—	June 14, 2020	Haleakala	Pan-STARRS 1	·	2.4 km	MPC · JPL
719700	2020 LK_{15}	—	June 14, 2020	Haleakala	Pan-STARRS 1	·	730 m	MPC · JPL

== 719701–719800 ==
back to top

Designation			Discovery			Properties		Ref
Permanent	Provisional	Named after	Date	Site	Discoverer(s)	Category	Diam.	Ref
719701	2020 LH_{18}	—	November 26, 2005	Mount Lemmon	Mount Lemmon Survey	·	990 m	MPC · JPL
719702	2020 MC_{10}	—	May 11, 2013	Cerro Tololo	DECam	·	2.1 km	MPC · JPL
719703	2020 MV_{18}	—	June 29, 2020	Haleakala	Pan-STARRS 1	·	2.2 km	MPC · JPL
719704	2020 MP_{22}	—	June 27, 2020	Haleakala	Pan-STARRS 1	·	1.4 km	MPC · JPL
719705	2020 MC_{36}	—	December 23, 2017	Haleakala	Pan-STARRS 1	AST	1.3 km	MPC · JPL
719706	2020 MC_{40}	—	March 27, 2015	Kitt Peak	Spacewatch	·	1.1 km	MPC · JPL
719707	2020 MC_{46}	—	February 22, 2007	Mount Graham	Trilling, D. E.	·	1.7 km	MPC · JPL
719708	2020 MW_{57}	—	July 5, 2016	Haleakala	Pan-STARRS 1	·	1.1 km	MPC · JPL
719709	2020 NW_{6}	—	July 14, 2020	Palomar	Zwicky Transient Facility	·	1.0 km	MPC · JPL
719710	2020 OM_{9}	—	June 30, 2014	Kitt Peak	Spacewatch	·	3.1 km	MPC · JPL
719711	2020 OW_{30}	—	July 17, 2020	Haleakala	Pan-STARRS 1	·	2.0 km	MPC · JPL
719712	2020 OO_{32}	—	July 30, 2020	Mount Lemmon	Mount Lemmon Survey	EOS	1.5 km	MPC · JPL
719713	2020 OJ_{33}	—	April 23, 2014	Cerro Tololo	DECam	·	1.3 km	MPC · JPL
719714	2020 OU_{41}	—	July 26, 2020	Mount Lemmon	Mount Lemmon Survey	EOS	1.1 km	MPC · JPL
719715	2020 OU_{44}	—	July 23, 2020	Haleakala	Pan-STARRS 1	EOS	1.4 km	MPC · JPL
719716	2020 OB_{45}	—	July 28, 2020	Haleakala	Pan-STARRS 1	·	1.0 km	MPC · JPL
719717	2020 OR_{59}	—	June 26, 2014	Haleakala	Pan-STARRS 1	EOS	1.8 km	MPC · JPL
719718	2020 OT_{63}	—	July 18, 2020	Haleakala	Pan-STARRS 2	ERI	1.3 km	MPC · JPL
719719	2020 OH_{100}	—	April 8, 2019	Haleakala	Pan-STARRS 1	·	1.5 km	MPC · JPL
719720	2020 OJ_{102}	—	April 23, 2014	Cerro Tololo	DECam	KOR	980 m	MPC · JPL
719721	2020 OT_{103}	—	May 21, 2015	Haleakala	Pan-STARRS 1	·	1.1 km	MPC · JPL
719722	2020 OZ_{104}	—	July 23, 2020	Haleakala	Pan-STARRS 1	EOS	1.1 km	MPC · JPL
719723	2020 OA_{105}	—	July 17, 2020	Haleakala	Pan-STARRS 1	·	1.4 km	MPC · JPL
719724	2020 OJ_{105}	—	May 20, 2015	Cerro Tololo	DECam	·	1.0 km	MPC · JPL
719725	2020 OF_{112}	—	July 22, 2020	Haleakala	Pan-STARRS 1	·	1.4 km	MPC · JPL
719726	2020 PG_{28}	—	August 14, 2020	Haleakala	Pan-STARRS 1	·	1.7 km	MPC · JPL
719727	2020 PV_{28}	—	August 15, 2020	Haleakala	Pan-STARRS 1	·	1.8 km	MPC · JPL
719728	2020 PH_{39}	—	April 15, 2016	Mount Lemmon	Mount Lemmon Survey	L4	7.6 km	MPC · JPL
719729	2020 PQ_{39}	—	August 14, 2020	Haleakala	Pan-STARRS 1	EOS	1.4 km	MPC · JPL
719730	2020 PX_{51}	—	September 21, 2009	Mount Lemmon	Mount Lemmon Survey	L4 · (8060)	6.4 km	MPC · JPL
719731	2020 PK_{52}	—	October 10, 2010	Mount Lemmon	Mount Lemmon Survey	EOS	1.4 km	MPC · JPL
719732	2020 PL_{52}	—	May 1, 2016	Cerro Tololo	DECam	L4	6.2 km	MPC · JPL
719733	2020 PT_{65}	—	July 28, 2014	Haleakala	Pan-STARRS 1	·	2.4 km	MPC · JPL
719734	2020 PN_{66}	—	August 12, 2020	Haleakala	Pan-STARRS 1	·	1.2 km	MPC · JPL
719735	2020 PA_{73}	—	August 12, 2020	Haleakala	Pan-STARRS 1	TEL	1.0 km	MPC · JPL
719736	2020 PV_{73}	—	August 15, 2020	Haleakala	Pan-STARRS 1	L4 · ERY	6.6 km	MPC · JPL
719737	2020 PK_{74}	—	August 13, 2020	Mount Lemmon	Mount Lemmon Survey	·	1.6 km	MPC · JPL
719738	2020 PX_{74}	—	August 3, 2014	Haleakala	Pan-STARRS 1	·	2.2 km	MPC · JPL
719739	2020 PY_{74}	—	May 7, 2016	Haleakala	Pan-STARRS 1	L4	5.9 km	MPC · JPL
719740	2020 PC_{77}	—	August 13, 2020	Haleakala	Pan-STARRS 1	·	2.5 km	MPC · JPL
719741	2020 PG_{77}	—	August 14, 2020	Haleakala	Pan-STARRS 1	·	2.0 km	MPC · JPL
719742	2020 PK_{81}	—	January 15, 2018	Mount Lemmon	Mount Lemmon Survey	·	1.8 km	MPC · JPL
719743	2020 PS_{93}	—	February 15, 2013	Haleakala	Pan-STARRS 1	·	1.4 km	MPC · JPL
719744	2020 PP_{113}	—	August 15, 2020	Haleakala	Pan-STARRS 1	·	2.0 km	MPC · JPL
719745	2020 PU_{115}	—	August 15, 2020	Haleakala	Pan-STARRS 1	·	1.9 km	MPC · JPL
719746	2020 QQ_{8}	—	May 20, 2014	Haleakala	Pan-STARRS 1	·	2.0 km	MPC · JPL
719747	2020 QU_{8}	—	October 23, 2016	Mount Lemmon	Mount Lemmon Survey	·	1.5 km	MPC · JPL
719748	2020 QX_{8}	—	September 13, 2007	Mount Lemmon	Mount Lemmon Survey	·	1.2 km	MPC · JPL
719749	2020 QC_{9}	—	October 8, 2002	Anderson Mesa	LONEOS	·	1.6 km	MPC · JPL
719750	2020 QU_{13}	—	August 19, 2020	Mount Lemmon	Mount Lemmon Survey	·	1.3 km	MPC · JPL
719751	2020 QX_{13}	—	May 8, 2019	Haleakala	Pan-STARRS 1	·	1.2 km	MPC · JPL
719752	2020 QF_{18}	—	August 23, 2020	Haleakala	Pan-STARRS 1	KOR	1.1 km	MPC · JPL
719753	2020 QQ_{37}	—	August 18, 2020	Haleakala	Pan-STARRS 1	·	1.3 km	MPC · JPL
719754	2020 QQ_{66}	—	October 16, 2009	Mount Lemmon	Mount Lemmon Survey	L4	5.8 km	MPC · JPL
719755	2020 QO_{77}	—	August 19, 2020	Haleakala	Pan-STARRS 1	·	2.1 km	MPC · JPL
719756	2020 QW_{88}	—	August 23, 2020	Haleakala	Pan-STARRS 1	·	3.0 km	MPC · JPL
719757	2020 RF_{11}	—	April 1, 2011	Mount Lemmon	Mount Lemmon Survey	·	950 m	MPC · JPL
719758	2020 RJ_{11}	—	September 30, 2003	Kitt Peak	Spacewatch	ADE	1.5 km	MPC · JPL
719759	2020 RK_{11}	—	September 19, 2003	Kitt Peak	Spacewatch	·	1.2 km	MPC · JPL
719760	2020 RQ_{24}	—	May 1, 2019	Haleakala	Pan-STARRS 1	·	1.2 km	MPC · JPL
719761	2020 RF_{29}	—	August 28, 2014	Haleakala	Pan-STARRS 1	·	2.3 km	MPC · JPL
719762	2020 RY_{43}	—	May 27, 2014	Haleakala	Pan-STARRS 1	BRA	1.4 km	MPC · JPL
719763	2020 RU_{53}	—	September 10, 2020	Mount Lemmon	Mount Lemmon Survey	MRX	820 m	MPC · JPL
719764	2020 RX_{53}	—	April 23, 2014	Cerro Tololo	DECam	·	1.2 km	MPC · JPL
719765	2020 RG_{55}	—	September 9, 2020	Haleakala	Pan-STARRS 1	·	1.1 km	MPC · JPL
719766	2020 RH_{55}	—	September 10, 2020	Mount Lemmon	Mount Lemmon Survey	HOF	1.8 km	MPC · JPL
719767	2020 RG_{84}	—	September 21, 2009	Mount Lemmon	Mount Lemmon Survey	L4 · ERY	5.8 km	MPC · JPL
719768	2020 RB_{90}	—	September 12, 2020	Haleakala	Pan-STARRS 1	·	1.6 km	MPC · JPL
719769	2020 RO_{99}	—	September 10, 2020	Haleakala	Pan-STARRS 1	MAS	540 m	MPC · JPL
719770	2020 RD_{105}	—	May 20, 2015	Cerro Tololo	DECam	·	610 m	MPC · JPL
719771	2020 RZ_{105}	—	February 3, 2012	Mount Lemmon	Mount Lemmon Survey	·	1.9 km	MPC · JPL
719772	2020 RV_{108}	—	October 16, 2015	Mount Lemmon	Mount Lemmon Survey	EOS	1.2 km	MPC · JPL
719773	2020 RJ_{110}	—	September 15, 2020	Haleakala	Pan-STARRS 1	·	1.3 km	MPC · JPL
719774	2020 RP_{145}	—	September 14, 2020	Haleakala	Pan-STARRS 1	·	1.7 km	MPC · JPL
719775	2020 RU_{145}	—	November 8, 2010	Mauna Kea	Forshay, P., M. Micheli	EOS	1.5 km	MPC · JPL
719776	2020 RK_{169}	—	February 22, 2017	Mount Lemmon	Mount Lemmon Survey	·	2.6 km	MPC · JPL
719777	2020 SZ_{11}	—	January 10, 2013	Haleakala	Pan-STARRS 1	·	1.1 km	MPC · JPL
719778	2020 SR_{17}	—	April 23, 2014	Cerro Tololo	DECam	·	1.6 km	MPC · JPL
719779	2020 ST_{17}	—	May 30, 2014	Kitt Peak	M. W. Buie	·	1.4 km	MPC · JPL
719780	2020 SQ_{19}	—	September 16, 2020	Haleakala	Pan-STARRS 2	·	1.7 km	MPC · JPL
719781	2020 SG_{23}	—	January 30, 2012	Mount Lemmon	Mount Lemmon Survey	EOS	1.4 km	MPC · JPL
719782	2020 SN_{32}	—	September 21, 2003	Kitt Peak	Spacewatch	·	580 m	MPC · JPL
719783	2020 SH_{34}	—	June 29, 2019	Haleakala	Pan-STARRS 1	KOR	1.1 km	MPC · JPL
719784	2020 SO_{34}	—	April 5, 2014	Haleakala	Pan-STARRS 1	HOF	1.8 km	MPC · JPL
719785	2020 SR_{34}	—	May 25, 2019	Haleakala	Pan-STARRS 1	·	680 m	MPC · JPL
719786	2020 SY_{35}	—	April 23, 2014	Cerro Tololo	DECam	·	1.1 km	MPC · JPL
719787	2020 SO_{36}	—	September 17, 2020	Haleakala	Pan-STARRS 2	·	1.5 km	MPC · JPL
719788	2020 SR_{58}	—	September 16, 2020	Haleakala	Pan-STARRS 1	HOF	1.9 km	MPC · JPL
719789	2020 SU_{72}	—	March 8, 2008	Kitt Peak	Spacewatch	·	670 m	MPC · JPL
719790	2020 SN_{82}	—	September 17, 2020	Haleakala	Pan-STARRS 1	L4	5.2 km	MPC · JPL
719791	2020 SA_{84}	—	October 10, 2015	Haleakala	Pan-STARRS 1	KOR	950 m	MPC · JPL
719792	2020 SY_{90}	—	September 16, 2020	Haleakala	Pan-STARRS 1	EOS	1.4 km	MPC · JPL
719793	2020 SV_{96}	—	November 11, 2010	Kitt Peak	Spacewatch	L4	5.9 km	MPC · JPL
719794	2020 SO_{98}	—	September 16, 2020	Haleakala	Pan-STARRS 2	·	2.1 km	MPC · JPL
719795	2020 SJ_{99}	—	September 23, 2020	Mount Lemmon	Mount Lemmon Survey	·	2.1 km	MPC · JPL
719796	2020 SQ_{110}	—	September 16, 2020	Haleakala	Pan-STARRS 1	·	1.6 km	MPC · JPL
719797	2020 TV_{10}	—	November 4, 2007	Kitt Peak	Spacewatch	·	1.3 km	MPC · JPL
719798	2020 TW_{13}	—	October 24, 2014	Cerro Tololo	DECam	·	1.7 km	MPC · JPL
719799	2020 TU_{17}	—	July 27, 2014	Haleakala	Pan-STARRS 1	·	1.5 km	MPC · JPL
719800	2020 TY_{17}	—	October 14, 2020	Mount Lemmon	Mount Lemmon Survey	·	1.9 km	MPC · JPL

== 719801–719900 ==
back to top

Designation			Discovery			Properties		Ref
Permanent	Provisional	Named after	Date	Site	Discoverer(s)	Category	Diam.	Ref
719801	2020 TG_{19}	—	October 21, 2003	Kitt Peak	Spacewatch	·	1.2 km	MPC · JPL
719802	2020 TR_{21}	—	March 21, 2017	Haleakala	Pan-STARRS 1	·	1.8 km	MPC · JPL
719803	2020 TZ_{24}	—	October 8, 2020	Haleakala	Pan-STARRS 1	WIT	810 m	MPC · JPL
719804	2020 TO_{27}	—	October 11, 2020	Mount Lemmon	Mount Lemmon Survey	EUN	970 m	MPC · JPL
719805	2020 TX_{27}	—	January 31, 2010	WISE	WISE	EOS	1.4 km	MPC · JPL
719806	2020 TH_{59}	—	October 14, 2020	Haleakala	Pan-STARRS 2	·	1.5 km	MPC · JPL
719807	2020 TM_{69}	—	March 22, 2014	Mount Lemmon	Mount Lemmon Survey	L4	6.6 km	MPC · JPL
719808	2020 TM_{72}	—	March 4, 2014	Cerro Tololo	DECam	L4	5.9 km	MPC · JPL
719809	2020 TU_{73}	—	July 2, 2019	Haleakala	Pan-STARRS 1	·	1.8 km	MPC · JPL
719810	2020 TT_{74}	—	October 13, 2020	Mount Lemmon	Mount Lemmon Survey	·	1.5 km	MPC · JPL
719811	2020 TQ_{80}	—	June 28, 2019	Haleakala	Pan-STARRS 1	·	1.4 km	MPC · JPL
719812	2020 UG_{39}	—	October 25, 2014	Haleakala	Pan-STARRS 1	·	2.2 km	MPC · JPL
719813	2020 UG_{49}	—	October 16, 2020	Mount Lemmon	Mount Lemmon Survey	·	1.6 km	MPC · JPL
719814	2020 UG_{53}	—	October 24, 2020	Haleakala	Pan-STARRS 2	·	1.7 km	MPC · JPL
719815	2020 UA_{55}	—	March 27, 2017	Mount Lemmon	Mount Lemmon Survey	·	2.0 km	MPC · JPL
719816	2020 UW_{77}	—	October 18, 2020	Haleakala	Pan-STARRS 1	·	2.3 km	MPC · JPL
719817	2020 VJ_{8}	—	November 11, 2020	Mount Lemmon	Mount Lemmon Survey	·	2.3 km	MPC · JPL
719818	2020 VR_{8}	—	May 20, 2014	Haleakala	Pan-STARRS 1	·	700 m	MPC · JPL
719819	2020 VW_{25}	—	November 11, 2020	Mount Lemmon	Mount Lemmon Survey	·	1.6 km	MPC · JPL
719820	2020 WK_{17}	—	February 7, 2011	Mount Lemmon	Mount Lemmon Survey	·	700 m	MPC · JPL
719821	2020 WB_{23}	—	November 16, 2020	Haleakala	Pan-STARRS 1	·	1.5 km	MPC · JPL
719822	2020 XE_{7}	—	March 20, 2015	Haleakala	Pan-STARRS 1	L4	8.1 km	MPC · JPL
719823	2020 XV_{19}	—	December 21, 2014	Haleakala	Pan-STARRS 1	·	690 m	MPC · JPL
719824	2020 XG_{23}	—	September 24, 2019	Haleakala	Pan-STARRS 1	EOS	1.4 km	MPC · JPL
719825	2020 YK_{22}	—	March 16, 2005	Mount Lemmon	Mount Lemmon Survey	·	2.7 km	MPC · JPL
719826	2021 AE_{10}	—	January 29, 2012	Mount Lemmon	Mount Lemmon Survey	·	1.4 km	MPC · JPL
719827	2021 AS_{12}	—	January 8, 2010	Kitt Peak	Spacewatch	NYS	860 m	MPC · JPL
719828	2021 AT_{19}	—	January 10, 2014	Mount Lemmon	Mount Lemmon Survey	·	710 m	MPC · JPL
719829	2021 BY_{4}	—	March 12, 2010	Mount Lemmon	Mount Lemmon Survey	·	860 m	MPC · JPL
719830	2021 BV_{8}	—	October 18, 2012	Haleakala	Pan-STARRS 1	·	3.1 km	MPC · JPL
719831	2021 BA_{14}	—	January 16, 2021	Haleakala	Pan-STARRS 1	·	1.0 km	MPC · JPL
719832	2021 CO_{11}	—	March 22, 2017	Haleakala	Pan-STARRS 1	·	1.1 km	MPC · JPL
719833	2021 CT_{23}	—	August 26, 2017	Haleakala	Pan-STARRS 1	·	2.5 km	MPC · JPL
719834	2021 CK_{26}	—	January 15, 2011	Mount Lemmon	Mount Lemmon Survey	·	440 m	MPC · JPL
719835	2021 CP_{27}	—	December 20, 2014	Haleakala	Pan-STARRS 1	·	1.5 km	MPC · JPL
719836	2021 CY_{39}	—	April 6, 2011	Mount Lemmon	Mount Lemmon Survey	EOS	1.3 km	MPC · JPL
719837	2021 DE_{17}	—	June 7, 2016	Haleakala	Pan-STARRS 1	3:2	4.8 km	MPC · JPL
719838	2021 EW_{13}	—	May 14, 2008	Mount Lemmon	Mount Lemmon Survey	·	1.4 km	MPC · JPL
719839	2021 EW_{18}	—	July 13, 2013	Haleakala	Pan-STARRS 1	·	1.5 km	MPC · JPL
719840 Bilsemdüzce	2021 EW_{19}	Bilsemdüzce	March 15, 2021	Haleakala	Pan-STARRS 1	·	1.4 km	MPC · JPL
719841	2021 EG_{26}	—	February 27, 2012	Kitt Peak	Spacewatch	·	1.4 km	MPC · JPL
719842	2021 EN_{34}	—	April 20, 2010	Mount Lemmon	Mount Lemmon Survey	·	2.6 km	MPC · JPL
719843	2021 EK_{49}	—	March 7, 2021	Mount Lemmon	Mount Lemmon Survey	·	1.4 km	MPC · JPL
719844	2021 ER_{56}	—	January 20, 2015	Haleakala	Pan-STARRS 1	·	1.9 km	MPC · JPL
719845	2021 EA_{57}	—	November 7, 2008	Mount Lemmon	Mount Lemmon Survey	·	2.1 km	MPC · JPL
719846	2021 FT_{27}	—	April 26, 2017	Haleakala	Pan-STARRS 1	·	1.2 km	MPC · JPL
719847	2021 FV_{31}	—	October 16, 2012	Mount Lemmon	Mount Lemmon Survey	·	2.0 km	MPC · JPL
719848	2021 FJ_{37}	—	March 19, 2021	Mount Lemmon	Mount Lemmon Survey	·	970 m	MPC · JPL
719849	2021 FZ_{49}	—	March 20, 2021	Kitt Peak	Bok NEO Survey	·	790 m	MPC · JPL
719850	2021 FJ_{56}	—	March 20, 2021	Kitt Peak	Bok NEO Survey	·	1.9 km	MPC · JPL
719851	2021 GV_{8}	—	November 11, 2010	Mount Lemmon	Mount Lemmon Survey	·	1.0 km	MPC · JPL
719852	2021 GA_{12}	—	September 30, 2006	Kitt Peak	Spacewatch	·	2.1 km	MPC · JPL
719853	2021 GR_{14}	—	May 20, 2006	Kitt Peak	Spacewatch	3:2 · SHU	3.8 km	MPC · JPL
719854	2021 GO_{21}	—	February 20, 2015	Haleakala	Pan-STARRS 1	·	1.9 km	MPC · JPL
719855	2021 GM_{45}	—	December 1, 2014	Kitt Peak	Spacewatch	·	1.3 km	MPC · JPL
719856	2021 GG_{52}	—	April 4, 2021	Mount Lemmon	Mount Lemmon Survey	·	820 m	MPC · JPL
719857	2021 GX_{66}	—	February 10, 2016	Haleakala	Pan-STARRS 1	·	1.6 km	MPC · JPL
719858	2021 GK_{71}	—	September 29, 2013	Mount Lemmon	Mount Lemmon Survey	L5	6.8 km	MPC · JPL
719859	2021 GJ_{83}	—	December 3, 2005	Mauna Kea	A. Boattini	KOR	1.1 km	MPC · JPL
719860	2021 GT_{83}	—	January 21, 2015	Haleakala	Pan-STARRS 1	EOS	1.5 km	MPC · JPL
719861	2021 GZ_{109}	—	April 14, 2021	Haleakala	Pan-STARRS 1	HYG	2.3 km	MPC · JPL
719862	2021 GG_{113}	—	May 29, 2008	Kitt Peak	Spacewatch	EUN	800 m	MPC · JPL
719863	2021 GS_{113}	—	September 24, 2011	Mount Lemmon	Mount Lemmon Survey	·	2.1 km	MPC · JPL
719864	2021 GU_{113}	—	August 26, 2009	Catalina	CSS	·	720 m	MPC · JPL
719865	2021 GJ_{122}	—	April 10, 2021	Haleakala	Pan-STARRS 1	·	1.7 km	MPC · JPL
719866	2021 GP_{124}	—	March 2, 2016	Mount Lemmon	Mount Lemmon Survey	·	1.0 km	MPC · JPL
719867	2021 GV_{134}	—	January 16, 2009	Kitt Peak	Spacewatch	·	960 m	MPC · JPL
719868	2021 HA_{5}	—	July 19, 2013	Haleakala	Pan-STARRS 1	·	1.3 km	MPC · JPL
719869	2021 HF_{7}	—	November 18, 2014	Mount Lemmon	Mount Lemmon Survey	·	890 m	MPC · JPL
719870	2021 JA_{24}	—	January 22, 2015	Haleakala	Pan-STARRS 1	·	1.4 km	MPC · JPL
719871	2021 JM_{27}	—	May 8, 2021	Haleakala	Pan-STARRS 1	·	590 m	MPC · JPL
719872	2021 JU_{37}	—	December 28, 2005	Mount Lemmon	Mount Lemmon Survey	·	1.4 km	MPC · JPL
719873	2021 JL_{52}	—	May 9, 2021	Haleakala	Pan-STARRS 1	·	1.5 km	MPC · JPL
719874	2021 JS_{56}	—	January 26, 2015	Haleakala	Pan-STARRS 1	·	1.3 km	MPC · JPL
719875	2021 JW_{61}	—	May 11, 2021	Cerro Tololo	DECam	·	1.6 km	MPC · JPL
719876	2021 NW_{23}	—	July 9, 2021	Kitt Peak	Bok NEO Survey	·	1.2 km	MPC · JPL
719877	2021 NP_{27}	—	July 5, 2021	Haleakala	Pan-STARRS 1	·	1.4 km	MPC · JPL
719878	2021 NG_{44}	—	November 1, 2018	Mount Lemmon	Mount Lemmon Survey	·	640 m	MPC · JPL
719879	2021 NH_{58}	—	July 4, 2021	Haleakala	Pan-STARRS 1	·	880 m	MPC · JPL
719880	2021 NU_{65}	—	October 11, 2009	Mount Lemmon	Mount Lemmon Survey	·	1.1 km	MPC · JPL
719881	2021 NJ_{67}	—	July 9, 2021	Haleakala	Pan-STARRS 1	EOS	1.4 km	MPC · JPL
719882	2021 OK_{14}	—	July 20, 2021	Haleakala	Pan-STARRS 1	·	440 m	MPC · JPL
719883	2021 OB_{26}	—	July 31, 2021	Haleakala	Pan-STARRS 1	EOS	1.3 km	MPC · JPL
719884	2021 PR_{8}	—	April 18, 2015	Cerro Tololo	DECam	·	1.2 km	MPC · JPL
719885	2021 PZ_{17}	—	August 2, 2021	Haleakala	Pan-STARRS 1	WIT	660 m	MPC · JPL
719886	2021 PA_{19}	—	August 3, 2016	Haleakala	Pan-STARRS 1	·	1.4 km	MPC · JPL
719887	2021 PP_{19}	—	March 28, 2016	Cerro Tololo	DECam	·	800 m	MPC · JPL
719888	2021 PT_{27}	—	January 24, 2018	Mount Lemmon	Mount Lemmon Survey	·	2.4 km	MPC · JPL
719889	2021 PV_{35}	—	January 17, 2015	Haleakala	Pan-STARRS 1	MAR	610 m	MPC · JPL
719890	2021 PJ_{42}	—	August 5, 2021	Haleakala	Pan-STARRS 1	VER	1.7 km	MPC · JPL
719891	2021 PS_{55}	—	May 20, 2015	Cerro Tololo	DECam	KOR	1 km	MPC · JPL
719892	2021 PC_{57}	—	August 11, 2021	Haleakala	Pan-STARRS 1	·	700 m	MPC · JPL
719893	2021 PB_{71}	—	January 12, 2018	Haleakala	Pan-STARRS 1	·	2.3 km	MPC · JPL
719894	2021 PJ_{80}	—	October 22, 2012	Mount Lemmon	Mount Lemmon Survey	·	1.5 km	MPC · JPL
719895	2021 PU_{85}	—	August 3, 2021	Haleakala	Pan-STARRS 1	·	540 m	MPC · JPL
719896	2021 PH_{99}	—	August 12, 2021	Haleakala	Pan-STARRS 1	·	1.4 km	MPC · JPL
719897	2021 PU_{105}	—	August 11, 2021	Haleakala	Pan-STARRS 1	·	2.2 km	MPC · JPL
719898	2021 PP_{156}	—	August 9, 2021	Haleakala	Pan-STARRS 1	·	1.2 km	MPC · JPL
719899	2021 QB_{26}	—	August 31, 2021	Haleakala	Pan-STARRS 1	·	1.3 km	MPC · JPL
719900	2021 QV_{34}	—	August 31, 2021	Haleakala	Pan-STARRS 1	·	1.7 km	MPC · JPL

== 719901–720000 ==
back to top

Designation			Discovery			Properties		Ref
Permanent	Provisional	Named after	Date	Site	Discoverer(s)	Category	Diam.	Ref
719901	2021 QB_{49}	—	October 14, 2012	Nogales	M. Schwartz, P. R. Holvorcem	·	1.5 km	MPC · JPL
719902	2021 QM_{67}	—	August 16, 2021	Haleakala	Pan-STARRS 1	KOR	1.0 km	MPC · JPL
719903	2021 QH_{82}	—	May 20, 2015	Cerro Tololo	DECam	KOR	1.0 km	MPC · JPL
719904	2021 QG_{115}	—	May 21, 2014	Haleakala	Pan-STARRS 1	·	1.3 km	MPC · JPL
719905	2021 RW_{19}	—	September 7, 2021	Mount Lemmon	Mount Lemmon Survey	MAR	800 m	MPC · JPL
719906	2021 RZ_{23}	—	September 5, 2021	Haleakala	Pan-STARRS 1	·	800 m	MPC · JPL
719907	2021 RG_{33}	—	June 24, 2014	Mount Lemmon	Mount Lemmon Survey	·	660 m	MPC · JPL
719908	2021 RX_{88}	—	September 8, 2021	Haleakala	Pan-STARRS 1	EMA	2.0 km	MPC · JPL
719909	2021 RL_{111}	—	February 2, 2006	Kitt Peak	Spacewatch	LIX	2.7 km	MPC · JPL
719910	2021 RB_{177}	—	September 30, 2011	Mount Lemmon	Mount Lemmon Survey	·	1.5 km	MPC · JPL
719911	2021 RZ_{213}	—	January 20, 2009	Kitt Peak	Spacewatch	·	1.3 km	MPC · JPL
719912	2021 SL_{13}	—	February 18, 2015	Mount Lemmon	Mount Lemmon Survey	·	900 m	MPC · JPL
719913	2021 SE_{18}	—	March 16, 2018	Mount Lemmon	Mount Lemmon Survey	·	2.2 km	MPC · JPL
719914	2021 SJ_{77}	—	September 25, 2021	Haleakala	Pan-STARRS 1	·	1.5 km	MPC · JPL
719915	2021 TD_{23}	—	October 10, 2007	Mount Lemmon	Mount Lemmon Survey	·	1.3 km	MPC · JPL
719916	2021 TD_{30}	—	February 7, 2002	Kitt Peak	Deep Ecliptic Survey	·	1.1 km	MPC · JPL
719917	2021 TN_{36}	—	April 19, 2015	Cerro Tololo	DECam	L4	6.5 km	MPC · JPL
719918	2021 TQ_{43}	—	January 11, 2008	Kitt Peak	Spacewatch	MAS	400 m	MPC · JPL
719919	2021 TB_{51}	—	March 29, 2019	Mount Lemmon	Mount Lemmon Survey	AGN	880 m	MPC · JPL
719920	2021 TE_{60}	—	April 10, 2015	Mount Lemmon	Mount Lemmon Survey	·	1.2 km	MPC · JPL
719921	2021 TM_{64}	—	October 13, 2021	Haleakala	Pan-STARRS 1	·	1.5 km	MPC · JPL
719922	2021 TJ_{82}	—	November 14, 2006	Kitt Peak	Spacewatch	·	1.4 km	MPC · JPL
719923	2021 TD_{83}	—	April 5, 2019	Haleakala	Pan-STARRS 1	·	1.4 km	MPC · JPL
719924	2021 TH_{100}	—	December 16, 2007	Mount Lemmon	Mount Lemmon Survey	(2076)	640 m	MPC · JPL
719925	2021 TW_{105}	—	September 4, 2019	Mount Lemmon	Mount Lemmon Survey	L4	6.4 km	MPC · JPL
719926	2021 TF_{111}	—	February 24, 2012	Kitt Peak	Spacewatch	·	2.1 km	MPC · JPL
719927	2021 TV_{138}	—	October 3, 2021	Haleakala	Pan-STARRS 1	·	1.8 km	MPC · JPL
719928	2021 TG_{163}	—	July 26, 2020	Mount Lemmon	Mount Lemmon Survey	·	1.4 km	MPC · JPL
719929	2021 TQ_{163}	—	March 5, 2013	Mount Lemmon	Mount Lemmon Survey	EOS	1.3 km	MPC · JPL
719930	2021 UK_{8}	—	September 9, 2015	Haleakala	Pan-STARRS 1	EMA	2.1 km	MPC · JPL
719931	2021 UE_{13}	—	October 26, 2021	Haleakala	Pan-STARRS 1	·	2.4 km	MPC · JPL
719932	2021 UT_{19}	—	September 30, 2005	Mount Lemmon	Mount Lemmon Survey	3:2	3.8 km	MPC · JPL
719933	2021 UX_{20}	—	January 3, 2009	Mount Lemmon	Mount Lemmon Survey	·	1.4 km	MPC · JPL
719934	2021 UZ_{37}	—	October 8, 2008	Mount Lemmon	Mount Lemmon Survey	L4	6.0 km	MPC · JPL
719935	2021 UN_{38}	—	August 3, 2016	Haleakala	Pan-STARRS 1	·	1.1 km	MPC · JPL
719936	2021 UY_{40}	—	September 15, 2017	Haleakala	Pan-STARRS 1	PHO	750 m	MPC · JPL
719937	2021 UY_{43}	—	November 18, 2014	Haleakala	Pan-STARRS 1	·	810 m	MPC · JPL
719938	2021 UC_{45}	—	March 18, 2018	Haleakala	Pan-STARRS 1	·	2.3 km	MPC · JPL
719939	2021 UU_{47}	—	October 31, 2021	Haleakala	Pan-STARRS 2	·	1.2 km	MPC · JPL
719940	2021 UK_{62}	—	August 17, 2020	Haleakala	Pan-STARRS 1	·	2.0 km	MPC · JPL
719941	2021 UO_{65}	—	November 11, 2010	Mount Lemmon	Mount Lemmon Survey	·	2.5 km	MPC · JPL
719942	2021 UF_{69}	—	October 27, 2021	Kitt Peak	Bok NEO Survey	·	1.4 km	MPC · JPL
719943	2021 UW_{84}	—	May 11, 2013	Cerro Tololo	DECam	·	1.9 km	MPC · JPL
719944	2021 UJ_{90}	—	October 31, 2021	Haleakala	Pan-STARRS 2	EOS	1.2 km	MPC · JPL
719945	2021 UV_{90}	—	October 28, 2021	Haleakala	Pan-STARRS 1	·	2.2 km	MPC · JPL
719946	2021 VG_{12}	—	November 26, 2017	Mount Lemmon	Mount Lemmon Survey	·	870 m	MPC · JPL
719947	2021 VU_{19}	—	March 23, 2012	Mount Lemmon	Mount Lemmon Survey	·	810 m	MPC · JPL
719948	2021 VJ_{23}	—	December 30, 2008	Mount Lemmon	Mount Lemmon Survey	·	1.2 km	MPC · JPL
719949	2021 VS_{24}	—	October 18, 2012	Haleakala	Pan-STARRS 1	·	1.5 km	MPC · JPL
719950	2021 VR_{29}	—	August 8, 2019	Haleakala	Pan-STARRS 2	L4	5.3 km	MPC · JPL
719951	2021 VV_{39}	—	November 14, 2021	Mount Lemmon	Mount Lemmon Survey	·	1.2 km	MPC · JPL
719952	2021 VZ_{42}	—	November 1, 2021	Haleakala	Pan-STARRS 2	·	870 m	MPC · JPL
719953	2021 VD_{50}	—	September 4, 2008	Kitt Peak	Spacewatch	(5)	780 m	MPC · JPL
719954	2021 VE_{66}	—	August 18, 2020	Haleakala	Pan-STARRS 1	·	2.2 km	MPC · JPL
719955	2021 VL_{97}	—	November 11, 2021	Haleakala	Pan-STARRS 1	·	1.9 km	MPC · JPL
719956	2021 WO_{7}	—	July 25, 2015	Haleakala	Pan-STARRS 1	·	1.6 km	MPC · JPL
719957	2021 WK_{11}	—	August 30, 2016	Mount Lemmon	Mount Lemmon Survey	·	1.0 km	MPC · JPL
719958	2022 AD_{16}	—	January 3, 2017	Haleakala	Pan-STARRS 1	EOS	1.4 km	MPC · JPL
719959	2022 AN_{21}	—	May 20, 2015	Cerro Tololo	DECam	·	720 m	MPC · JPL
719960	2022 AC_{34}	—	March 21, 2017	Haleakala	Pan-STARRS 1	·	2.3 km	MPC · JPL
719961	2022 BX_{43}	—	September 12, 2015	Haleakala	Pan-STARRS 1	KOR	1.0 km	MPC · JPL
719962	2022 BM_{45}	—	January 31, 2022	Haleakala	Pan-STARRS 2	·	1.9 km	MPC · JPL
719963	2022 BZ_{57}	—	January 4, 2016	Haleakala	Pan-STARRS 1	·	2.2 km	MPC · JPL
719964	2022 BC_{62}	—	January 28, 2022	Haleakala	Pan-STARRS 2	·	1.8 km	MPC · JPL
719965	2022 BE_{66}	—	April 10, 2013	Haleakala	Pan-STARRS 1	·	1.4 km	MPC · JPL
719966	2022 DP_{5}	—	August 12, 2013	Haleakala	Pan-STARRS 1	·	2.1 km	MPC · JPL
719967	2022 DS_{5}	—	October 28, 2014	Mount Lemmon	Mount Lemmon Survey	(31811)	2.5 km	MPC · JPL
719968	2022 GH_{12}	—	April 10, 2022	Haleakala	Pan-STARRS 2	KOR	1.1 km	MPC · JPL
719969	2022 GL_{15}	—	April 9, 2022	Haleakala	Pan-STARRS 2	·	1.5 km	MPC · JPL
719970	2022 GV_{15}	—	April 12, 2022	Haleakala	Pan-STARRS 2	AGN	970 m	MPC · JPL
719971	2022 JC_{3}	—	May 6, 2022	Mount Lemmon	Mount Lemmon Survey	·	2.1 km	MPC · JPL
719972	2022 LK_{3}	—	June 6, 2022	Haleakala	Pan-STARRS 2	L5	7.6 km	MPC · JPL
719973	2022 OJ_{8}	—	November 9, 2009	Mount Lemmon	Mount Lemmon Survey	·	1.4 km	MPC · JPL
719974	2022 OB_{39}	—	July 28, 2022	Haleakala	Pan-STARRS 2	KOR	990 m	MPC · JPL
719975	2022 PJ_{10}	—	April 14, 2015	Mount Lemmon	Mount Lemmon Survey	·	1.9 km	MPC · JPL
719976	2022 QS_{18}	—	March 10, 2016	Haleakala	Pan-STARRS 1	·	1.4 km	MPC · JPL
719977	2022 QQ_{62}	—	December 3, 2019	Mount Lemmon	Mount Lemmon Survey	EUN	890 m	MPC · JPL
719978	2022 QR_{102}	—	August 28, 2022	Haleakala	Pan-STARRS 2	·	1.3 km	MPC · JPL
719979	2022 QK_{204}	—	August 16, 2022	Hakos	G. Duszanowicz, J. Camarasa	APO +1km	1.1 km	MPC · JPL
719980	2022 RW_{89}	—	December 27, 2014	Mount Lemmon	Mount Lemmon Survey	·	1.3 km	MPC · JPL
719981	2022 SF_{39}	—	May 20, 2015	Cerro Tololo	DECam	·	1.6 km	MPC · JPL
719982	2022 SP_{39}	—	October 27, 2008	Kitt Peak	Spacewatch	KOR	980 m	MPC · JPL
719983	2022 SJ_{117}	—	May 20, 2015	Cerro Tololo	DECam	·	1.6 km	MPC · JPL
719984	2022 SV_{303}	—	September 22, 2022	Haleakala	Pan-STARRS 1	KOR	910 m	MPC · JPL
719985	2022 TC_{15}	—	March 31, 2019	Mount Lemmon	Mount Lemmon Survey	(1118)	2.2 km	MPC · JPL
719986	2022 UH_{52}	—	March 29, 2012	Kitt Peak	Spacewatch	·	780 m	MPC · JPL
719987 Zhonghe	2022 UZ_{64}	Zhonghe	October 10, 2017	Xingming	Liao, X., X. Gao	·	1.2 km	MPC · JPL
719988	2022 VL_{4}	—	November 5, 2022	Kitt Peak	Bok NEO Survey	·	1.6 km	MPC · JPL
719989	2022 VE_{9}	—	October 22, 2019	Mount Lemmon	Mount Lemmon Survey	·	820 m	MPC · JPL
719990	2022 YW_{10}	—	December 24, 2022	Cerro Tololo	DECam	·	1.9 km	MPC · JPL
719991	2023 BQ_{12}	—	January 4, 2006	Kitt Peak	Spacewatch	·	2.0 km	MPC · JPL
719992	2023 BY_{18}	—	January 23, 2023	Haleakala	Pan-STARRS 2	KOR	1.0 km	MPC · JPL
719993	2023 ES_{4}	—	August 31, 2014	Haleakala	Pan-STARRS 1	VER	1.9 km	MPC · JPL
719994	2023 EH_{5}	—	March 21, 2012	Mount Lemmon	Mount Lemmon Survey	·	2.1 km	MPC · JPL
719995	2023 FO_{15}	—	March 17, 2023	Haleakala	Pan-STARRS 1	·	2.5 km	MPC · JPL
719996	2023 FE_{23}	—	March 27, 2023	Haleakala	Pan-STARRS 2	·	1.1 km	MPC · JPL
719997	2023 FR_{28}	—	April 1, 2008	Kitt Peak	Spacewatch	·	920 m	MPC · JPL
719998	2023 FB_{45}	—	March 10, 2014	Kitt Peak	Spacewatch	·	1.3 km	MPC · JPL
719999	2023 FT_{57}	—	March 28, 2023	Haleakala	Pan-STARRS 1	·	1.4 km	MPC · JPL
720000	2023 GQ_{5}	—	November 27, 2014	Haleakala	Pan-STARRS 1	·	2.2 km	MPC · JPL

back to top

== Meaning of names ==
As minor planet discoveries are confirmed, they are given a permanent number by the IAU's Minor Planet Center (MPC), and the discoverers can then submit names for them, following the IAU's naming conventions. The list below concerns those minor planets in the specified number-range that have received names, and explains the meanings of those names.

Official naming citations of newly named small Solar System bodies are approved and published in a bulletin by IAU's Working Group for Small Bodies Nomenclature (WGSBN). Before May 2021, citations were published in MPC's Minor Planet Circulars for many decades. Recent citations can also be found on the JPL Small-Body Database (SBDB). Until his death in 2016, German astronomer Lutz D. Schmadel compiled these citations into the Dictionary of Minor Planet Names (DMP) and regularly updated the collection.

Based on Paul Herget's The Names of the Minor Planets, Schmadel also researched the unclear origin of numerous asteroids, most of which had been named prior to World War II. This article incorporates text from this source, which is in the public domain: SBDB New namings may only be added to this list below after official publication as the preannouncement of names is condemned. The WGSBN publishes a comprehensive guideline for the naming rules of non-cometary small Solar System bodies.

Named minor planet	Provisional	This minor planet was named for...	Ref · Catalog
719612 Hoshizaki	2019 UW_{157}	Hoshizaki, the fictional high school in the Japanese comic Asteroid in Love.	IAU · 719612
719840 Bilsemdüzce	2021 EW_{19}	The name “Bilsemdüzce” honors the Düzce province of Turkey and all BILSEMs nationwide.	IAU · 719840
719987 Zhonghe	2022 UZ_{64}	"Zhonghe" is the motto of the Hefei No. 4 Middle School, which has a well-established astronomy club.	IAU · 719987
