= Science and technology in Turkey =

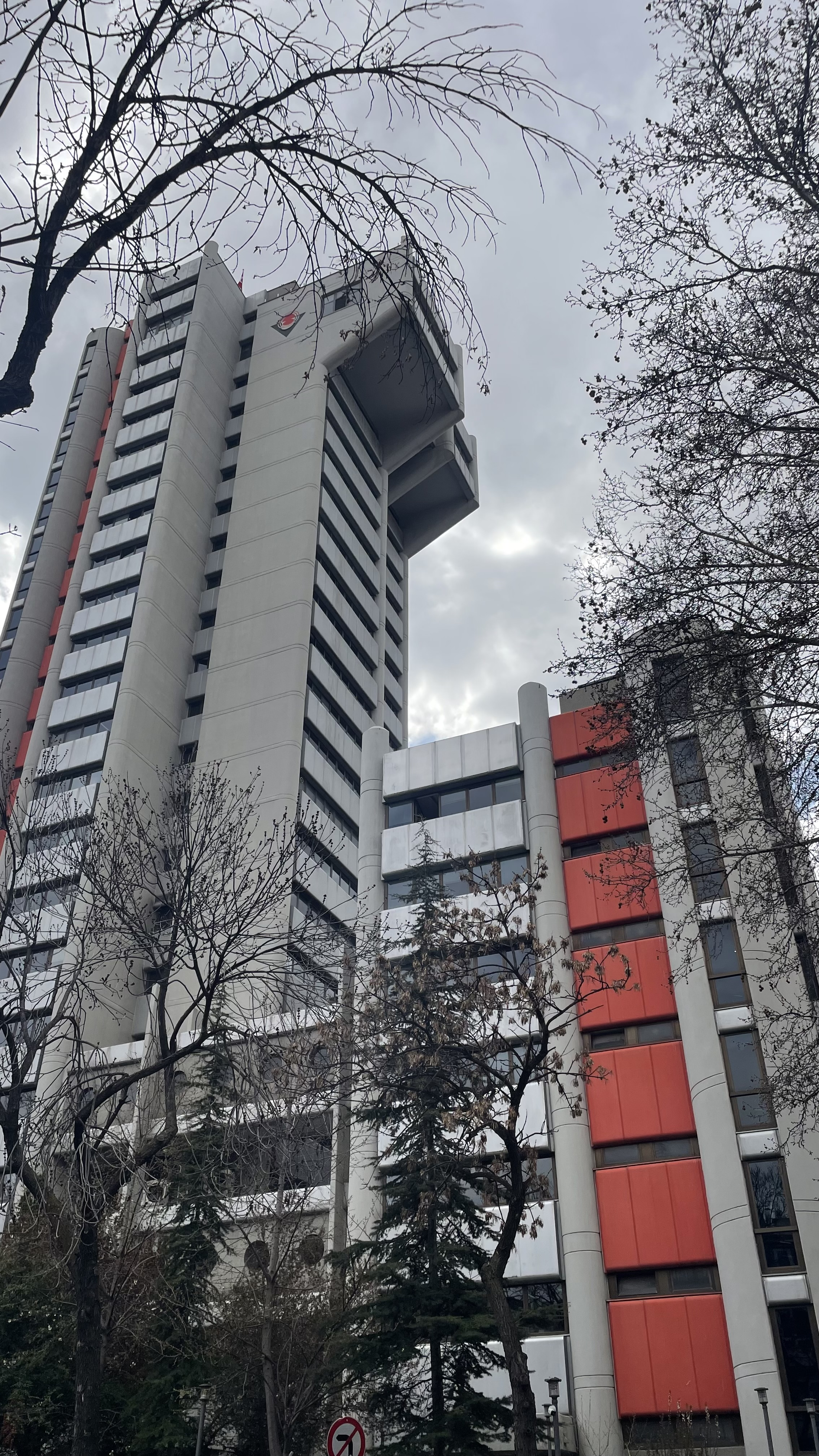
Scientific and Technological Research Council of Turkey is located in Ankara

Science and technology in Turkey is centrally planned by TÜBİTAK and in responsibility of universities and research institutes. Research and development activities in Turkey show a significant jump in recent years. Turkey was ranked 43rd in the Global Innovation Index in 2025, and has increased its ranking considerably since 2011, where it was ranked 65th. Turkey boasts over 80 technoparks where around 6,000 national and multinational companies engage in R&D activities. Turkish Academy of Sciences supports scientists, scientific studies, and making science policies. TAEK is the country's official nuclear energy institution, focused on academic research and the development and implementation of peaceful nuclear technology.

== History ==
=== Ottoman Empire ===
==== Advancement of madrasah ====
The madrasah education institution, which first originated during the Seljuk period, reached its highest point during the Ottoman reign.

==== Education of Ottoman Women in Medicine ====
Harems were places within a Sultan's palace where his wives, daughters, and female slaves were expected to stay. However, accounts of teaching young girls and boys here have been recorded. Most education of women in the Ottoman Empire was focused on teaching the women to be good house wives and social etiquette. Although the formal education of women was not popular, female physicians and surgeons were still accounted for. Female physicians were given an informal education instead of a formal one. However, the first properly trained female Turkish physician was Safiye Ali. Ali studied medicine in Germany and opened her own practice in Istanbul in 1922, 1 year before the fall of the Ottoman Empire.

==== Technical education ====
Istanbul Technical University has a history that began in 1773. It was founded by Sultan Mustafa III as the Imperial Naval Engineers' School (original name: Mühendishane-i Bahr-i Humayun), and it was originally dedicated to the training of ship builders and cartographers. In 1795 the scope of the school was broadened to train technical military staff to modernize the Ottoman army to match the European standards. In 1845 the engineering department of the school was further developed with the addition of a program devoted to the training of architects. The scope and name of the school were extended and changed again in 1883 and in 1909 the school became a public engineering school which was aimed at training civil engineers who could create new infrastructure to develop the empire.

== Trends in national innovation system, 2015–2019 ==
In 2017, business-funded research and development (R&D) exceeded that funded by the government and higher education sectors combined, for the first time, although most business-funded investment goes towards military and dual-use technologies. For instance, the leading Turkish firm for the number of patents is the principal military industry conglomerate Aselsan; it owns 54% of all resident patents, compared to just 17% for the leading patent-owner in Israel, Teva Pharmaceuticals.

The Turkish Exporters Assembly has reported that defence and aerospace was the leading sector in terms of export growth in the first five months of 2019, according to a press release by the Anatolia Agency on 5 June 2019.

A growing share of business-funded R&D is being driven by tax incentives, the sectoral composition of which is determined by the government. However, this trend mainly concerns innovation in manufacturing, which is open to competition largely thanks to the Customs Union with the EU in effect since 1996.

Research funding from abroad has, indeed, progressed to about 3.5% of total research spending in 2017, up from 2% in 2015.

The prevailing sentiment in academic circles, however, is that there is a mismatch between the level of public support for innovation and the amount of innovation in the economy. This sentiment is shared by Prof. Hasan Mandal, the head of T.BITAK, who notes the insufficiency and lack of focus of public support given to development ‘from prototypes to production’. He admits that there has been an ‘insufficient connection of R&D efforts to the needs of final consumers and needs analyses'.

More importantly, firms in the services and construction sectors, which accounted for 63.5% of GDP in 2018, remain largely shielded from competition. Even those that treat innovation as an afterthought remain profitable. They can afford to ignore the government's support programmes for R&D and manufacturing-focused innovation.

The low returns that researchers can expect for their efforts are impeding the development of the national innovation system. Although patent applications by Turkish inventors have been growing, as have granted patents, available evidence suggests that inventive activity in Turkey is largely disconnected from global collaboration networks.

For the first time since 2002, scientific output declined by 5.2% between 2016 and 2018. Publications continue to exhibit low international co-authorship and citation rates.

Meanwhile, tertiary enrolment has grown rapidly. To accommodate this new influx, no fewer than 30 universities were founded between 2016 and 2019, 20 of which are public institutions. By 2018, the gross enrolment ratio was 109.5%, and the number of doctoral students had risen by 22% to 95100 since 2015.

However, the unemployment rate among university graduates increased from 10.3% in 2008 to 12.7% in 2017. Just 2% of university entrants study natural sciences or mathematics, statistics and computer science in Turkey, compared to an average of 6% and 5%, respectively, in other OECD countries.

The pursuit of science and innovation in Turkey continues to be a largely government-driven endeavour. The heavy focus on defence-related capabilities is not likely to generate a significant spillover to the rest of the economy.

== Institutions ==
- Scientific and Technological Research Council of Turkey (TÜBİTAK)
- Turkish Academy of Sciences (TÜBA)

=== Research Institutes ===
- Atomic Energy Authority
- Defense Industries Research and Development Institute
- Informatics and Information Security Research Center
- Institute of Materials Science and Nanotechnology
- Izmir Biomedicine and Genome Center
- Marmara Research Center
- Nanotechnology Research and Application Center
- National Magnetic Resonance Research Center
- National Metrology Institute
- National Research Institute of Electronics and Cryptology
- Space Technologies Research Institute

=== Technical Universities ===
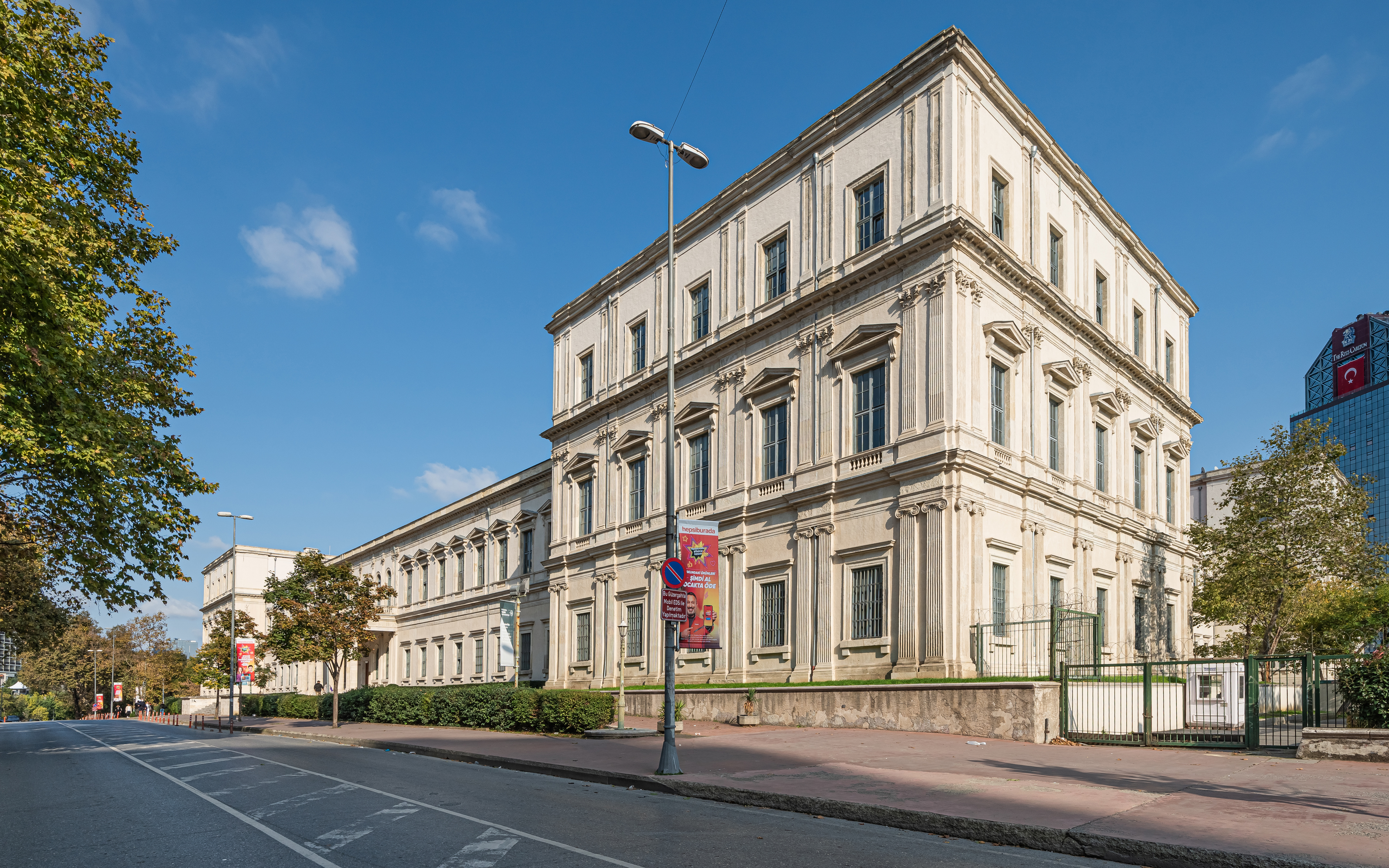
Taşkışla campus of Istanbul Technical University

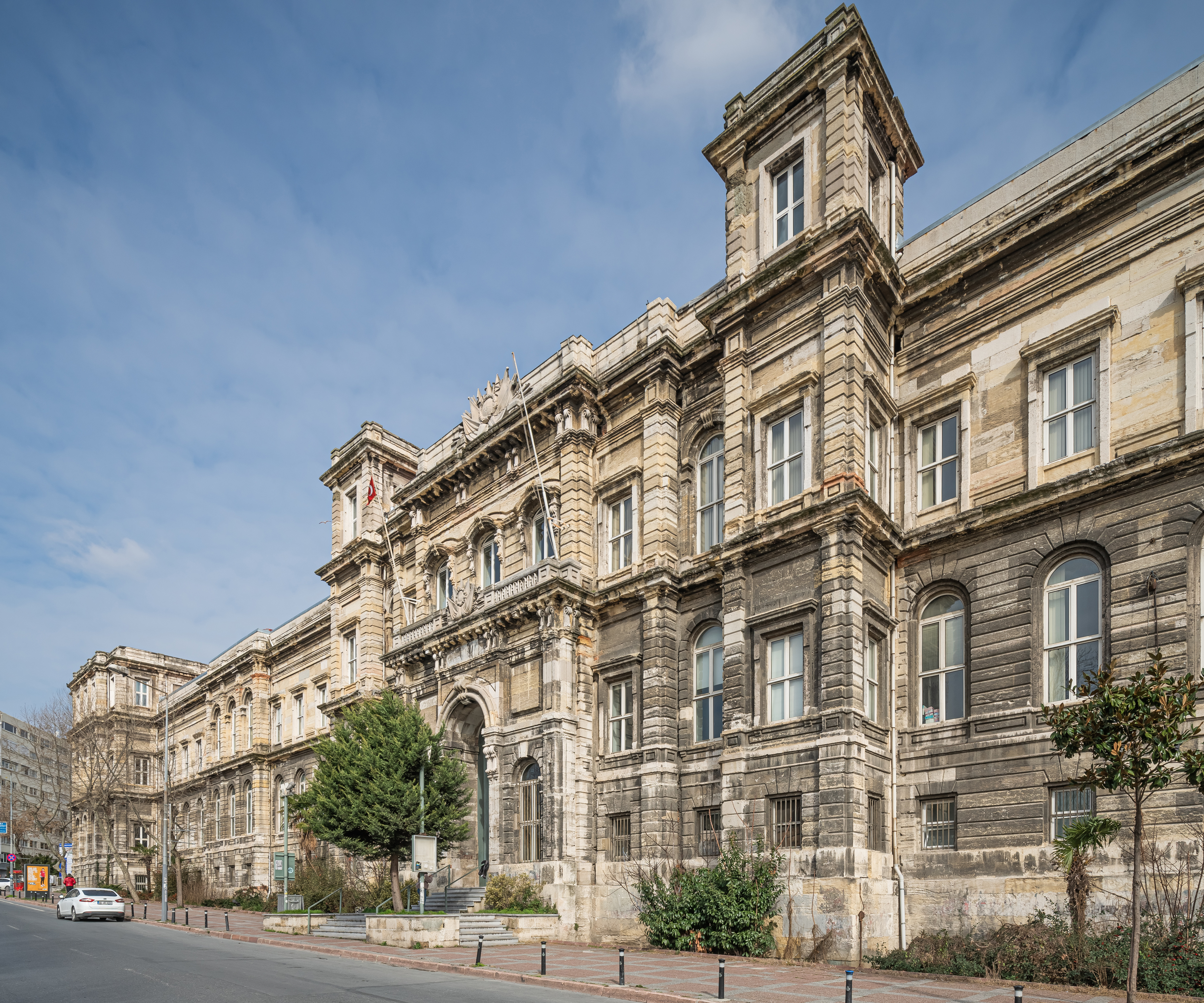
Maçka campus of Istanbul Technical University

There are seven universities in Turkey which are dedicated to engineering, technology and sciences:

- Istanbul Technical University (1773)
- Yıldız Technical University (1911)
- Karadeniz Technical University (1955)
- Middle East Technical University (1956)
- Gebze Technical University (1992)
- Bursa Technical University (2010)
- Erzurum Technical University (2010)

=== Technology Universities ===
- İzmir Institute of Technology (1992)
- TOBB University of Economics and Technology (2003)
- Adana Science and Technology University (2011)

== Agencies ==
- Turkish Space Agency (2018)
- Turkish Energy, Nuclear and Mineral Research Agency (2020)

== Notable scientists from Turkey ==
- Cahit Arf, mathematician, known for the Arf invariant
- Hulusi Behçet, dermatologist, known for reporting the Behçet's disease
- Feza Gürsey, physicist
- Erdal İnönü, physicist, winner of the 2004 Wigner Medal
- Muzafer Sherif, psychologist, one of the founders of social psychology
- Oktay Sinanoğlu, chemist
- Aziz Sancar, chemist, awarded the 2015 Nobel Prize in Chemistry
- Gazi Yaşargil, neurosurgeon, known as the father of microneurosurgery
- Sabri Ergun, chemical engineer, known with Ergun equation
- Dilhan Eryurt, astrophysicist, worked on the Apollo program

== See also ==
- Turkish names in space

== Sources ==
This article incorporates text from a free content work. Licensed under CC BY-SA 3.0 IGO Text taken from UNESCO Science Report: the Race Against Time for Smarter Development, UNESCO, UNESCO publishing. To learn how to add open license text to Wikipedia articles, please see this how-to page. For information on reusing text from Wikipedia, please see the terms of use.
