= Masatoshi Gündüz Ikeda =

Turkish mathematician

Masatoşi Gündüz İkeda
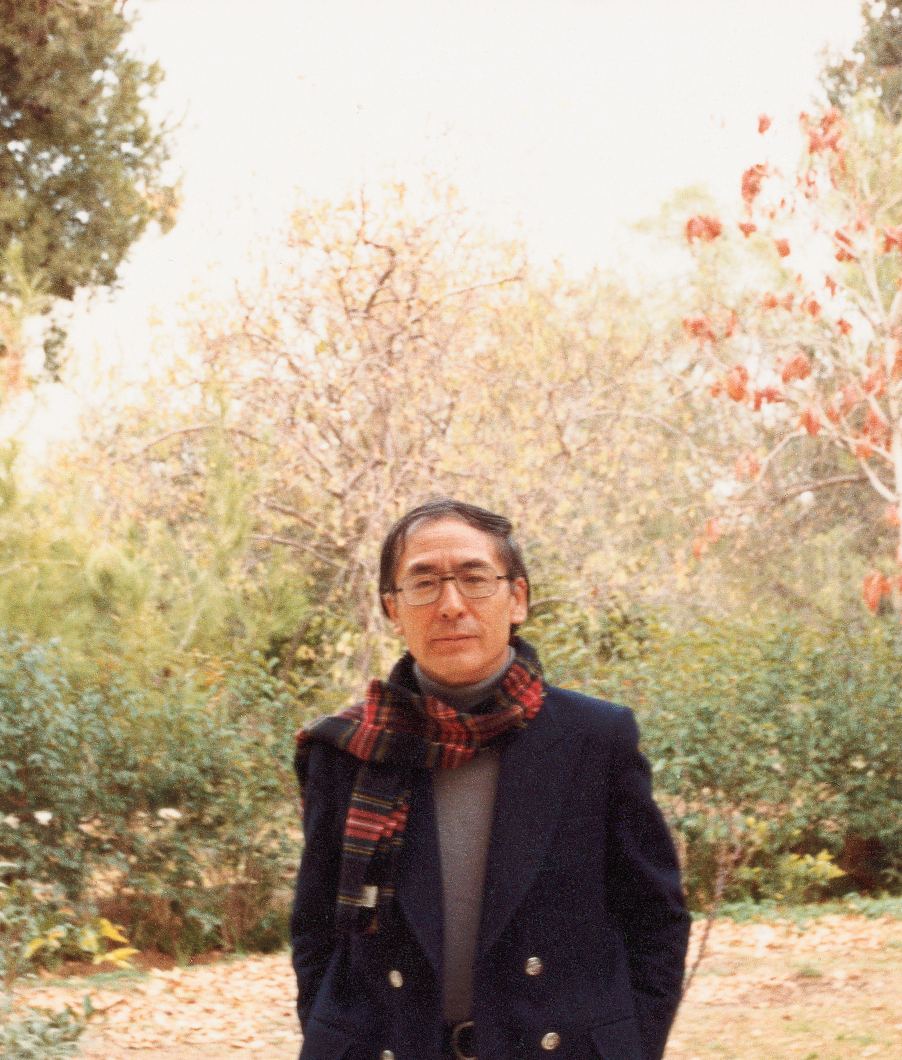
- Born: Ikeda Masatoshi (池田 正敏); 25 February 1926; Tokyo City, Japan
- Died: 9 February 2003 (aged 76); Ankara, Turkey
- Education: Osaka University (BS, PhD)
- Awards: METU Mustafa Parlar Foundation Science Prize (1993)
- Scientific career
- Fields: Algebra
- Workplaces: University of Hamburg; Ege University; Middle East Technical University; San Diego State University; Yarmouk University; Princeton University; Hacettepe University; TÜBİTAK MAM
- Thesis: On Absolutely Segregated Algebras (1953)
- Doctoral advisor: Kenjiro Shoda

Masatoşi Gündüz İkeda (25 February 1926 – 9 February 2003), was a Japanese-born Turkish mathematician known for his contributions to the field of algebraic number theory.

== Early years ==
Ikeda was born on 25 February 1926 in Tokyo, Japan, to Junzo Ikeda, head of the statistics department of an insurance company, and his wife Yaeko Ikeda. He was the youngest child with a brother and two sisters. He grew up reading mathematics books belonging to his father. During his school years, he bought himself used books about mathematics and the life story of mathematicians. He was very impressed by the French mathematician Évariste Galois (1811–1832).

== Academic career ==
Ikeda graduated from the mathematics department of Osaka University in 1948. He received a PhD degree with his thesis "On Absolutely Segregated Algebras", written in 1953 under the direction of Kenjiro Shoda. He was appointed associate professor in 1955. He pursued scientific research at the University of Hamburg in Germany, under the supervision of Helmut Hasse (1898–1979) between 1957 and 1959. On a suggestion from Hasse, he went to Turkey in 1960 and landed at Ege University in İzmir. In 1961, he was appointed a foreigner specialist in the Faculty of Science at the same university.

In 1964, Ikeda married Turkish biochemist Emel Ardor, whom he met and followed to Turkey. He was naturalized, converted to Islam and adopted the Turkish name Gündüz. He became associate professor in 1965 and a full professor in 1966. In 1968, with permission of the university, he went to the Middle East Technical University (METU) in Ankara as a visiting professor for one year. However, following the end of his term, he was offered a permanent post as a full professor, which he accepted upon the proposal of the mathematician Cahit Arf, whom he had known since his early years in Turkey.

From time to time, Ikeda was invited as a visiting professor to various universities such as the University of Hamburg (1966), San Diego State University, California (1971), and Yarmouk University in Irbid, Jordan (1984, 1985–86). In 1976, Ikeda carried out research work at Princeton University. In 1976, Ikeda went to Hacettepe University in Ankara, where he chaired the mathematics department until 1978, before he returned to METU. He retired in 1992 at METU. His scientific devotion was in Galois theory.

Among the research institutions Ikeda served were TÜBİTAK Marmara Research Center and Turkish National Research Institute of Electronics and Cryptology. Finally, he worked at the Feza Gürsey Basic Sciences Research Center in Istanbul.

Ikeda was a member of the Basic Sciences Board at the Scientific and Technological Research Council of Turkey (TÜBİTAK), and served as the head of the Mathematic Research Unit at the METU.

== Family life and death ==
Ikeda died on 9 February 2003, in Ankara. Following a religious funeral service held on 12 February at Kocatepe Mosque, he was laid to rest at the Karşıyaka Cemetery. He was the father of two sons, both born in Turkey.

== Recognition ==
In 1979, Ikeda was honored with the TÜBİTAK Science Award.

The Mathematics Foundation of Turkey established the "Masatoshi Gündüz İkeda Research Award" in Ikeda's memory.

== See also ==
- Anabelian geometry
