= Ayşe Soysal =

Turkish mathematician

Ayşe Soysal (born June 24, 1948) is a Turkish mathematician. She was the president of Boğaziçi University in Istanbul during 2004 to 2008.

== Life and career ==
Born in 1948, she received her high school diploma in 1967 from the American College for Girls in Istanbul. She received her B.Sc. with high honors in Mathematics and Physics from Boğaziçi University (formerly Robert College) in 1971.

Soysal pursued further education in the United States, where she received a M.Sc. (1973) and Ph.D. (1976) in mathematics from the University of Michigan in Ann Arbor.

She was appointed as a member of faculty in Boğaziçi University Department of Mathematics as an assistant professor in 1976. In her long term of instruction, Soysal was renowned as a polite and student-friendly professor. She was appointed associate professor in 1981 and full professor in 1991. Since 2009, Soysal is teaching at Koç University Department of Mathematics as an adjunct professor. She taught group theory, ring theory and fields, vector spaces model, topology, algebraic topology, group cohomology, differential equations, linear algebra, matrix theory, real analysis, complex analysis, probability theory, commutative algebra, geometric algebra, group representations.

Soysal also held office as vice dean of the Boğaziçi University Faculty of Arts and Sciences, and the chairman of the Department of Mathematics. Between 1992 and 2004, Soysal was elected dean of the Faculty of Arts and Sciences for four consecutive terms. She also represented Boğaziçi University in the Inter-University Council and she held board membership for the Turkey branch of UNESCO.

Between 2008 and 2012, he served as a member of the Scientific Board of the Scientific and Technological Research Council of Turkey (TÜBİTAK), the Executive Board of the TÜBİTAK Marmara Research Center and the Board of Directors of the Feza Gürsey Institute. Between 2009-2013, he served as a member of the General Assembly of the Turkish Council of Higher Education.

Soysal was appointed as the president of Boğaziçi University in 2004, and was the first woman who occupied the office. She served as president until August 2008. She retired from her position as professor at Boğaziçi University end 2014.

Later, she continued her academic career as part-time professor at Istanbul Şehir University.
