= Aral Ibrahim Okay =

Aral Ibrahim Okay (1953-2023) was a Turkish petrologist best known for his research on the Mediterranean Basin and the Black Sea. He was elected full member of the Turkish Academy of Sciences and won two awards from the Turkish Scientific Research Council.
