= Remziye Hisar =

Turkish academic and chemist

- Born: 1902; Üsküp, Ottoman Empire
- Died: 13 June 1992 (aged 89–90); Istanbul, Turkey
- Resting place: Istanbul
- Education: Istanbul University; Sorbonne University
- Spouse: Reşit Süreyya Gürsey (m. 1920–1930)
- Children: Feza Gürsey (1921–1992); Deha Gürsey Owen (1924–2012)
- Awards: TÜBİTAK
- Scientific career
- Fields: Chemistry
- Workplaces: Baku, Adana, Istanbul
- Thesis: (1933)
- Doctoral advisor: Paul Pascal

Remziye Hisar (1902 – 13 June 1992) was a Turkish academic and chemist. As the first Turkish woman with a degree from Sorbonne University, she occupied academic positions at various Turkish universities during her career and published numerous articles, mostly on metaphosphates and Turkish herbs. She is considered to be one of the first modern women scientists of Turkey.

== Early years ==
She was born 1902 in Üsküp (Skopje), then part of the Ottoman Empire, where her father Salih Hulusi was appointed as a civil servant. Her mother was Ayşe Refia. One year after the proclamation of the Second Constitution, the family returned to Istanbul in 1909.

She was enrolled in a primary school while her grandmother hosted the family in her house. Remziye finished the 3-grade school in one year only earning her first diploma. With the appointment of her father to another place in Istanbul, the family moved again and she was schooled for the secondary education at different places on both sides of Bosporus. She then followed her teacher, who was appointed to the Girls' Teachers High School (Dârülmuallimât). She studied five years at the boarding school in Çapa, Fatih including the two additional years, which enabled study at a higher educational institution. Remziye was educated in natural science at "Darülfünun" (forerunner of today's Istanbul University), where her primary interest was in chemistry. She graduated with honors on 15 July 1919.

Right after graduation, she joined a small group of her female schoolmates to go to Baku, Azerbaijan to serve there at a teacher's college. The group sailed to Batumi, and took a three-day train ride to Baku. During a dinner in Baku, given by a wealthy Azeri, Remziye met Reşit Süreyya (later surnamed Gürsey), a medicine doctor from Turkey. The couple engaged on 18 March 1920 and married one month later on 20 April. Very soon after, she and her husband left Azerbaijan, which was invaded by the Soviet Army, and returned to Istanbul.

On 7 April 1921 she gave birth to her son Feza (Gürsey), who later became a notable mathematician and physicist. She received a call from her former teacher, who in the meantime had become a director of education in the ministry, to go to Adana for serving there as a teacher. Remziye went there by sea via Mersin after leaving her one-and-half years old son to her mother and elder sister in İstanbul. She taught mathematics at a two-class school.

After one year, she followed her husband to Paris, France to complete her higher education. In 1924, her daughter Deha (Gürsey Owen) was born in Paris, who became later the Turkish member of International Psychology Association. There, she was educated in chemistry at Sorbonne University, also being a student of Marie Curie. During this time, she received a scholarship from the Turkish government, and her son was with her sister in Paris. Remziye earned a certificate in biochemistry. She was the first Turkish woman to earn a certificate in Sorbonne. Although she wanted to conduct doctoral studies, she had to return home due to omission of her scholarship with the completion of her education.

== Career ==
Arrived in Istanbul, she was appointed administrative staff at Erenköy Girls High School. Remziye did not like the post because she wanted to teach chemistry. Her application to study for her PhD degree on scholarship in Paris was initially rejected. So, she applied for a vacant chemistry teacher's position at the Mining Engineering School in Zonguldak. Thereupon, Minister of Education Cemal Hüsnü (Taray) offered her a scholarship for doctoral studies in France, and her son Feza's entry into the renowned Galatasaray High School as a free-of-charge boarding student.

In 1930, the couple divorced. She took her daughter Deha and her younger sister Mihri along with her to Paris, where the sister cared for the daughter. She conducted research on Metaphosphate by Paul Pascal (1880-1968) receiving her PhD title three years later with honors.

In 1933, Remziye returned home. She was appointed associate professor of general chemistry and physical chemistry at Istanbul University, which had recently undergone an organizational reformation. In 1936, she moved to Ankara to take the post of a specialist for biochemistry at the Pharmacodynamics Department of Public Health Institute.

In 1947, Remziye, who had adopted the surname Hisar following the commencement of the 1934 Surname Law in 1944, went to Istanbul Technical University to take again the post of associate professor in chemistry at the Faculty of Mechanical Engineering and Chemistry. She was promoted to full professor in 1959. In 1973, she retired. She published more than 20 articles during her career, mostly about metaphosphates and Turkish herbs, many of which were published in Bulletin de la Société Chimique de France.

== Later years ==
After her retirement, Remziye Hisar lived in her house at Anadoluhisarı inherited from her father. She died soon after hearing the death of her son Feza in 1992.

== Recognition ==
In 1991, she was rewarded by Scientific and Technological Research Council of Turkey (TÜBİTAK).
