= The Science Academy Society of Turkey =

The Science Academy Society (Turkish: Bilim Akademisi Derneği) is an independent, private, self-governing association founded on November 25, 2011 in Istanbul, Turkey.

The Association, henceforth known as the Science Academy Society, serves as an independent institution dedicated to uniting Turkish scientists. The primary aim of the Science Academy Society is to elevate public understanding of matters pertaining to scientific practices, policies, education, and ethics. This is achieved through the organization and supervision of conferences, meetings, and publications by experts. A key objective of the Society is to enlighten both the general public and various institutions about the impact and societal implications of scientific and scholarly research.

The Science Academy Society became an associate member of All European Academies (ALLEA) in 2014, and a full member in 2017. It is also a member of the International Science Council.

== Foundation ==
The Science Academy Society was founded when the Turkish Academy of Sciences (Turkish: Türkiye Bilimler Akademisi, TÜBA) lost its autonomous status following executive decrees on August 27, 2011, and November 3, 2011, which stipulated the appointment of TÜBA members by government agencies.

A large fraction of the regular, honorary and associate members of TÜBA then resigned on the grounds that TÜBA had lost the quality of being an independent academy of science.

Seventeen of these resigned TÜBA members founded the Science Academy Society on November 25, 2011, joined shortly after by most of the other resigned members.

== Members ==
The Science Academy Society boasts a membership comprising 235 full members and 40 honorary members. The full membership includes 137 professionals from the fields of natural sciences, mathematics, and engineering; 61 from social sciences and humanities; and 37 from medical sciences. Among the honorary members are three Nobel Laureates: Martin Chalfie, who was awarded the Nobel Prize in Chemistry in 2008; Peter Diamond, who received the Nobel Prize in Economics in 2010; and John Polanyi, Nobel Laureate in Chemistry in 1986.

== Activities ==
The Science Academy Society engages in the following activities:

- Organization of annual and monthly public conferences online and also in İstanbul and Ankara. The presentations and video recordings of these conferences are openly shared on the web page of the association.
- Investigative reports, prepared by members of the Science Academy and addressing events concerning current economic and scientific developments, are regularly published on the website of the Academy.
- In cooperation with Boğaziçi University, the Science Academy also organizes the Feza Gürsey Summer Schools on topics ranging from cosmology to mathematics.
- The Science Academy Society Young Scientists Program (BAGEP) provides grants to financially support the research of promising young scientists and scholars. The program is entirely funded by donations from many individuals and private foundations, and as such, it is the first of its kind in Turkey.
