= Ekmel Özbay =

Turkish scientist (born 1966)

- Born: March 25, 1966 (age 60); Ankara, Turkey
- Education: Middle East Technical University; Stanford University
- Awards: Adolph Lomb Medal (1997); Descartes Prize (2005); METU Parlar Foundation Science Award (2024)
- Scientific career
- Fields: Electrical engineering; Photonics
- Workplaces: Ames National Laboratory; Bilkent University
- Thesis: Breaking world records in high-speed microelectronics using resonant tunneling diodes and Schottky photodiodes (1992)
- Doctoral advisor: David M. Bloom

Ekmel Özbay is a Turkish professor of Electrical and Electronics Engineering and Physics Departments at Bilkent University and the director of the Nanotechnology Research Center, and Space Technologies Research Center (BILUZAY) in Ankara.

== Biography ==
Ekmel Özbay was born on March 25, 1966, in Ankara, Turkey. He received his B.S. degree in electrical engineering from the Middle East Technical University, Ankara, Turkey in 1987. He received his M.S. and Ph.D. in electrical engineering from Stanford University in 1989 and 1992.

From 1992 to 1993, Özbay worked as a postdoctoral research associate at Stanford University. His research in Stanford focused on high speed resonant tunneling and optoelectronic devices.

Between 1993 and 1995, he worked as a scientist in the United States Department of Energy's Ames National Laboratory at Iowa State University in the area of photonic band gap materials.

He joined Bilkent University in 1995, where he is currently a full professor in the physics and electrical electronics engineering departments. His research areas include metamaterials, photonic crystals, MOCVD growth, fabrication and characterization of nanoelectronic and nanophotonic GaN/AlGaN devices, and high-performance near-infrared semiconductor photodetectors and lasers.

Since 2002, he is a topical editor of the journal Optics Letters. He has published 410 journal articles and 435 international conference proceedings. His publications have received more than 11500 citations according to the Web of Science. Özbay holds 2 patents in the area of photonic crystals. His recent review article on plasmonics appeared as an invited review article in Jan. 13th 2006 issue of Science. Currently, he is principal investigator and executive committee member of 3 EU-FP projects: STREP project EU-DALHM (Development and Analysis of Left Handed Materials), NoE-PHOREMOST (Nanophotonics to realize Molecular-Scale Technologies), and NoE-METAMORPHOSE (MetaMaterials Organized for radio, millimeter wave, and PHOtonic Superlattice Engineering). He is currently acting as the national delegate for Turkey in the program committee of EU-NMP (nanotechnologies, manufacturing and processes) which is in the process of preparing the workprogramme for EU-FP7. Besides the EU projects, he is principal investigator on 25 national projects supported by various funding agencies. He has worked with various high-tech companies in USA, Europe and Turkey.

== Awards ==
Özbay was the 1997 recipient of the Adolph Lomb Medal of the Optical Society of America and in 2005 of the European Union Descartes Science Award. He is also the recipient of the 1995 METU Parlar Foundation Young Scientist Award, 1996 Tugac Foundation Technology Development Award, 1997 TÜBİTAK Young Scientist Award, and 1998 Sedat Simavi Foundation Science Award. In 2024, he won the METU Parlar Foundation Science Award.

== Personal life ==
Outside of the workplace, Özbay has a number of children.
