= Parlar Foundation Science Award =

Turkish annual award

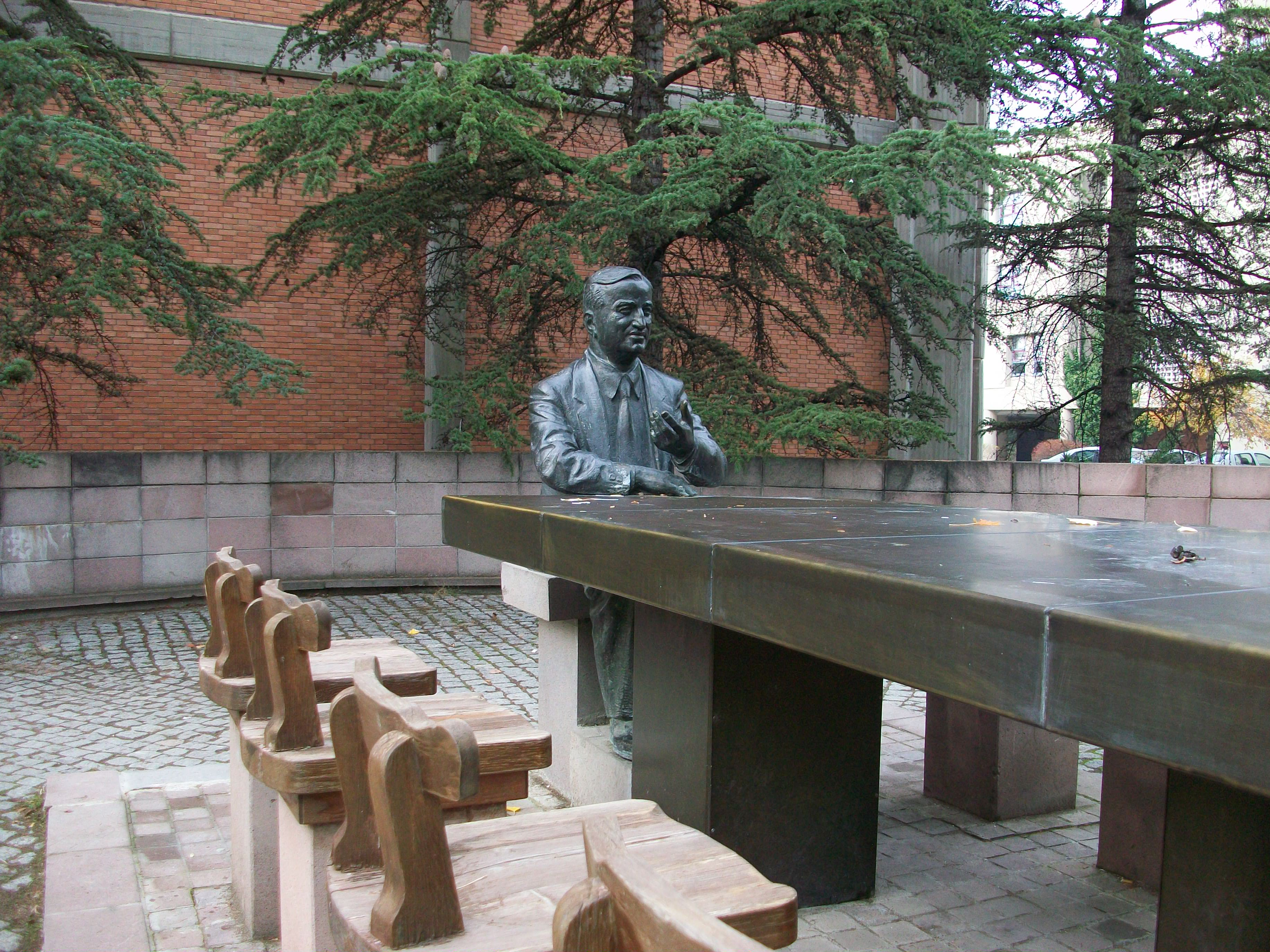
The statue of Mustafa N. Parlar is located in front of the Department of Industrial Engineering at Middle East Technical University.

The METU Parlar Foundation Science Award (Turkish: ODTÜ Mustafa Parlar Ödülü) is a science award issued by the Middle East Technical University Prof. Dr. Mustafa N. Parlar Foundation established in 1981 in Ankara, Turkey, commemorates Professor Mustafa N. Parlar, who served as the Dean of Engineering at the Middle East Technical University. The Foundation's mission is to promote advancements in science and technology and their applications in industry. Annually, it confers several prestigious awards to recognize significant contributions to science and service. These include the Service to Science and Honour Award, the Science Award, and the Service Award. Notable recipients of the Science Award include İoanna Kuçuradi in philosophy, Cahit Arf, Feza Gürsey and Erol Gelenbe in sciences, as well as Halil İnalcık in history.

== Background ==
The METU Prof. Dr. Mustafa N. Parlar Education and Research Foundation was established on January 12, 1981, in memory of Prof. Dr. Mustafa N. Parlar, a scientist and early faculty member of Middle East Technical University. The foundation aims to foster relationships between the university and industry, support research and researchers, provide technical hardware and tools, offer scholarships to METU students and financially assist lecturers.

Prof. Dr. Mustafa N. Parlar was a Turkish scientist and educator, born in 1925 in Çamlıhemşin, Rize. He studied at the Illinois Institute of Technology, Northwestern University, and Brooklyn Polytechnic Institute. Parlar worked as a research engineer and assistant professor in the Unites Satates before returning to Turkey. He held various academic and administrative roles at Middle East Technical University, including Director of Education, Chair of the Department of Electrical Engineering, and Dean of the Faculty of Engineering. He also served as Rector of METU and held positions within the Scientific and Technological Research Council of Turkey, contributing to the fields of energy and telecommunications in Turkey. Parlar was a member of the Grand National Assembly of Turkey from 1973 to 1977. In his honor, the METU Prof. Dr. Mustafa N. Parlar Education and Research Foundation was established in 1981 to support education and research.

Annually, the foundation awards several distinctions to recognize excellence within METU. These include the Honor, Science, Service, Research, and Technology Encouragement Awards. Additionally, it presents the Thesis of the Year Award to outstanding graduate and postgraduate students, the METU Lecturer of the Year Award to distinguished lecturers, the Thesis Advisor Award initiated in the 1996-1997 academic year, and the METU Excellence in Teaching Award, which is given to lecturers who have been recognized as the Year's Lecturer three times. These awards aim to evaluate the contributions of exceptional scientists and practitioners, certify their competencies, and inspire future generations.

== Award categories ==
- Annual Awards: Recognize distinguished scientists and practitioners across all scientific fields.
- Honorary Award: Highest award for significant achievements in science and service.
- Science Award: For substantial international scientific contributions or benefits to national development.
- Service Award: For contributions to social, technological, and economic development or higher education.
- Research Incentive Award: For young researchers under 40, contributing to scientific field development or solving national issues.
- Technology Incentive Award: For young researchers/developers under 40, contributing to specific industry branches.

== Nomination and selection ==
- Eligibility to Nominate: Representatives from higher education, research institutions, and previous award recipients.
- Award Jury: Consists of nine members, primarily from higher education, with one-third renewed every two years.
- Selection Process: Award Jury evaluates candidates based on expert assessments.
- Award Announcements: Made before the end of November each year.
- Award Ceremony: Held on December 19th annually, with plaques and certificates presented.

== Winners ==
Honorary award winners

- 1988 Cahit Arf
- 1989 Feza Gürsey
- 1992 Halil İnalcık
- 1994 Masatoshi Gündüz Ikeda
- 1995 Mete Sozen
- 1996 Ekrem Akurgal
- 2013 Yusuf Yağcı
- 2018 Mehmet Ali Alpar
- 2019 Aslıhan Tolun (Istanbul Technical University)
- 2024 Mustafa Pınar Mengüç (Özyeğin University)
- 2024 Muazzez İlmiye Çığ (Istanbul Archaeology Museums)

Science award winners

- 1984 Halim Doğrusöz
- 1985 Uğur Ersoy
- 1986 Ahmet Dervişoğlu
- 1987 Bahattin Baysal
- 1988 Sadrettin Sinman
- 1989 Şinasi Özsoylu
- 1990 Yalçın Mengi
- 1991 Mübeccel B. Kiray
- 1992 Tarık Ömer Oğurtani
- 1992 Murat R. Sertel
- 1993 Şerif Mardin
- 1993 Tekin Dereli
- 1994 Erol Gelenbe
- 1994 İlhan Tekeli
- 1995 Metin Heper
- 1995 Alinur Büyükaksoy
- 1996 Çiğdem Kağıçıbaşı
- 1996 Yurdanur Tulunay
- 1997 Merih Celasun
- 1997 Erdal Panayırcı
- 1998 Timur Doğu
- 1998 Çağlar Keyder
- 1999 Emel Arınç
- 1999 İ. Burhan Türkşen
- 2000 Asuman Doğaç
- 2000 Nuran Hortaçsu
- 2001 Vasıf Hasırcı
- 2001 Levent Toppare
- 2002 Bülent Sankur
- 2003 İonna Kuçuradi
- 2003 Metin Gürgöze
- 2004 Hasan Mandal
- 2005 Engin U. Akkaya
- 2006 Nevin Selçuk
- 2006 Vefa Ahsen
- 2007 Cevdet Aykanat
- 2008 Mustafa Verşan Kök
- 2010 Bilal Tanatar
- 2011 Murat Köksalan
- 2012 Haluk Sucuoğlu
- 2012 Özgür Ulusoy
- 2013 Alikram Nuhbalaoğlu (Aliev)
- 2014 Münevver Tezer
- 2015 Nesrin Hasırcı
- 2015 Mustafa Okyay Kaynak
- 2016 Aysıt Tansel
- 2018 Erhan Budak
- 2018 Yaşar Murat Elçin
- 2018 M. Lütfi Öveçoğlu
- 2019 Altan Baykal
- 2020 Burak Özbağcı (Koç University)
- 2020 Kerem Pekkan (Koç University)
- 2020 Syeda Arzu Wasti (Sabancı University)
- 2021 Seda Keskin Avcı (Koç University)
- 2021 Ali Koşar (Sabancı University)
- 2022 Zeki Kaya (METU)
- 2024 Ekmel Özbay (Bilkent University)
- 2025 Canan Başar Eroğlu (İzmir University of Economics)

== See also ==
- Middle East Technical University
- Humboldt Research Award
- Turing Award
