= RV Derinsu =

Turkish research and survey vessel

History

Turkey
- Name: Derinsu
- Owner: Derinsu Underwater Engineering, Ankara, Turkey
- Launched: 2006
- Homeport: Istanbul, Turkey
- Identification: IMO number: 9098294; MMSI number: 271042548
- Status: Active

General characteristics
- Class & type: Dredger
- Tonnage: 612 GT
- Length: 45.0 m (147 ft 8 in)
- Beam: 15.0 m (49 ft 3 in)
- Draft: 4.1 m (13 ft 5 in)

RV Derinsu is a Turkish research and survey vessel owned and operated in deep waters by Derinsu Underwater Engineering headquartered in Ankara, Turkey.

The company operates another research vessel RV Beluga.

== Vessel ==
Derinsu is 45 m (147 ft 8 in) long with a beam of 15 m (49 ft 3 in) and a max. draft of 4.1 m (13 ft 5 in). She has a tonnage of 612 GT

== Research capabilities ==
Originally a fishing boat, she was refit with state-of-the-art instruments and equipment for hydrographic, geophysical, geotechnical, oceanographic and marine environmental surveys. The vessel is capable of conducting research work in depths up to 3,000 m (9,800 ft).

== Service ==
In 2014, she was commissioned to carry out surveys in the Black Sea off Akliman, Sinop, where the construction of the Sinop Nuclear Power Plant is planned. Preliminary research works were completed by the RV TÜBİTAK Marmara.

== See also ==
- List of research vessels of Turkey
- RV Beluga
