= American Concrete Institute =

Organization

- Abbreviation: ACI
- Formation: January 17, 1905; 121 years ago
- Founded at: Indianapolis
- Type: Standards Development Organization
- Location: Farmington Hills, Michigan
- Services: Industry standards, Conferences, Publications, Certifications, Education
- Fields: Concrete, Civil engineering, Structural engineering, standards organization, construction
- Website: www.concrete.org
- Formerly called: National Association of Cement Users (NACU)

The American Concrete Institute (ACI, formerly National Association of Cement Users or NACU) is a non-profit technical society and standards developing organization. ACI was founded in January 1905 during a convention in Indianapolis. The institute's headquarters are currently located in Farmington Hills, Michigan, USA. ACI's mission is "ACI develops and disseminates consensus-based knowledge on concrete and its uses."

== ACI History ==
A lack of standards for making concrete blocks resulted in a negative perception of concrete for construction. An editorial by Charles C. Brown in the September 1904 issue of Municipal Engineering discussed the idea of forming an organization to bring order and standard practices to the industry. In 1905 the National Association of Cement Users was formally organized and adopted a constitution and bylaws. Richard Humphrey was elected its first President. The first committees were appointed at the 1905 convention in Indianapolis and offered preliminary reports on a number of subject areas. The first complete committee reports were offered at the 1907 convention. The association's first official headquarters was established in 1908 at Richard Humphrey's office in Philadelphia, Pennsylvania. Clerical and editorial help was brought on to more effectively organize conventions and publish proceedings of the institute. The "Standard Building Regulations for the Use of Reinforced Concrete" was adopted at the 1910 convention and became the association's first reinforced concrete building code. By 1912 the association had adopted 14 standards. At the December 1912 convention the association approved publication of a monthly journal of proceedings. In July 1913 the Board of Direction of NACU decided to change its name to the American Concrete Institute. The new name was deemed to be more descriptive of the work being conducted within the institute.

== ACI 318 ==
ACI 318 Building Code Requirements for Structural Concrete provides minimum requirements necessary to provide public health and safety for the design and construction of structural concrete buildings. It is issued and maintained by the American Concrete Institute. The latest edition of the code is ACI 318-19.

Previous versions: ACI 318-14 Major update, reordered chapters. ACI 318-11 ACI 318-08 ACI 318-02. Features major rewrite for seismicity.

== Concrete International ==
Concrete International is a monthly magazine published by the American Concrete Institute. Searchable abstracts of articles are available via the magazine's web page.

== Awards ==
The Wason Medal for Most Meritorious Paper has been awarded each year since 1917 to the author or authors of a paper published by ACI. Notable recipients include:

- 1922: Harold M. Westergaard
- 1927: Abraham Burton Cohen
- 1933: Charles S. Whitney
- 1936: Hardy Cross
- 1950: Chester P. Siess, George E. Beggs and Nathan M. Newmark
- 1953: Charles S. Whitney, Boyd Anderson and Mario Salvadori
- 1969: Uğur Ersoy
- 1970: W. Gene Corley and Neil M. Hawkins
- 1971: Fazlur Khan and Mark Fintel
