= Uğur Ersoy =

Turkish civil engineer and academic

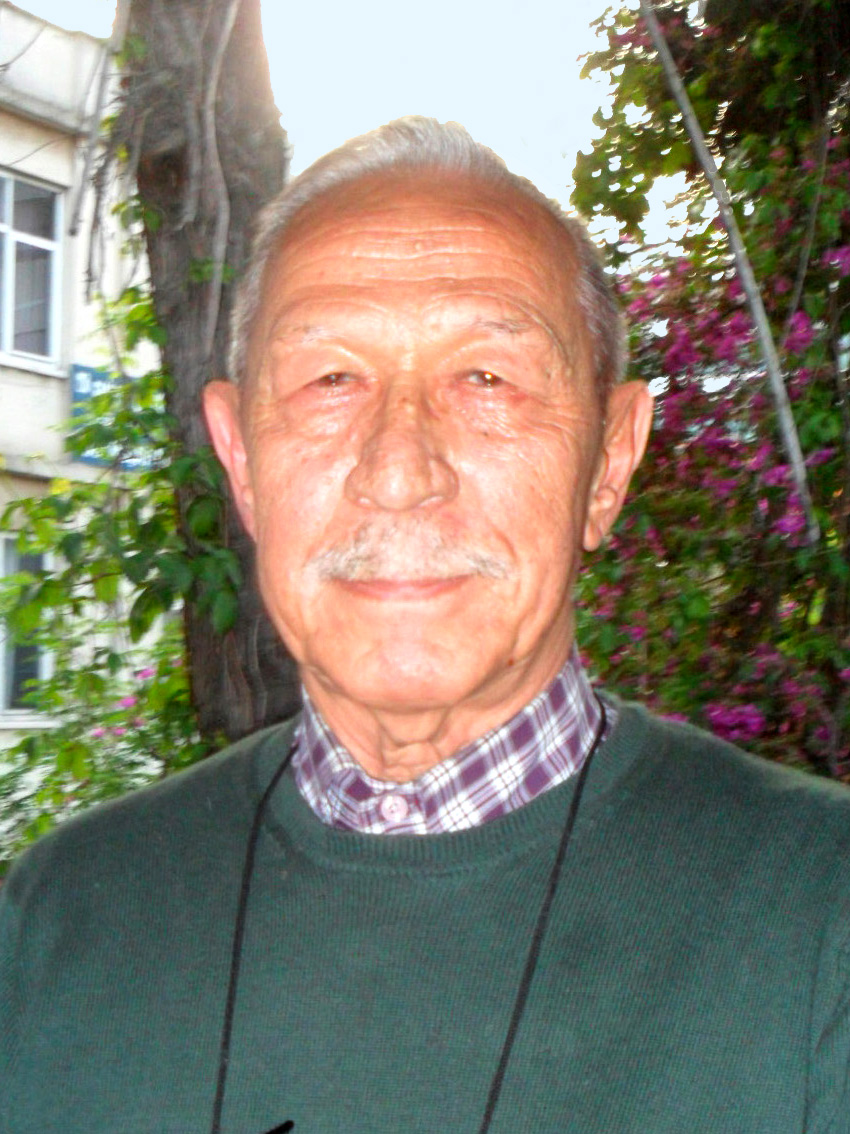
- Born: 1932; Mersin, Turkey
- Died: 18 September 2026 (aged 93–94); Istanbul
- Resting place: Mersin
- Education: University of Texas at Austin; Boğaziçi University
- Spouse: Peri Ersoy
- Awards: Wason Medal; METU Parlar Foundation Award; Turkish Prefabricate Union Award
- Scientific career
- Fields: Civil engineering, Structural Engineering

Uğur Ersoy (1932 – 18 September 2026) was a Turkish civil engineer and academic.

== Life ==
He was born in Mersin. His father Yakup Ersoy was the local chairman of the Republican People's Party (CHP). Teke, Cevdet (2023). "Içel Party Organization According To Adnan Menderes (Ertekin)'s İnspection Report". Van Yüzüncü Yıl Üniversitesi Sosyal Bilimler Enstitüsü Dergisi (Cumhuriyet Özel Sayısı). Dergipark: 366–375. doi:10.53568/yyusbed.1320174. After graduating from Tarsus American College, he earned his Bachelor of Science degree at the Robert College Department of Civil Engineering in 1955 with a high honour. He played soccer and volleyball in the Istanbul league in the same years. Then he travelled to the United States for further studies. He began his post-graduate education at the University of Texas at Austin. Ersoy also supervised and mentored by Phil M. Ferguson, a leading pioneer in developing the basic theory of design procedures for reinforced concrete structures, received his master's degree at this university in June 1956. After graduation, he worked as a project engineer at Raymond C. Reese and Associates in Toledo, Ohio for 2 years with Prof. Ferguson's recommendation. Ersoy worked on special buildings and problematic constructions in Reese's bureau. He worked as a researcher with the rank of third lieutenant at the Research and Development Office (ARGE) of Presidency of General Staff.

== Academic life ==
He started to work at Middle East Technical University (METU) in Ankara in June 1959, which was in the phase of establishment. He was the founder of the first structural research laboratory in Turkey. Uğur Ersoy became the first Vice Rector at METU and was in this position for two years. He took part in the formation and regulation throughout the establishment phase. In 1963, Ersoy left METU with permission and went back to the University of Texas, where he completed his doctorate in two years and returned in 1965. During his Ph.D. in Texas, he worked as a research associate in several important projects. In 1976, he became the founding dean of Icel Campus which was in the stage of establishment. In 1980-1981 he was a guest professor at the University of Toronto, Canada. Between 1992 and 1994, he served as Guest Professor at Boğaziçi University and founded the Building Laboratory. In 2006 he moved to Istanbul and became a member of Boğaziçi University staff.

Ugur Ersoy served twice as Head of department and three times as vice rector in METU.

He has about 150 articles and reports, 11 occupational books, 26 basic research reports. About 70 of his articles and notifications are published in international journals or refereed symposium proceeding books.

== Personal life ==
Uğur Ersoy was married with two children. His son Ahmet A. Ersoy is an academic in Boğaziçi University History Department. He has published nine story-memoir books; two of which were best sellers.

== Publications ==
He is the author of a number of books. His technical books are in English and Turkish.

- An Introduction to Limit Design (Published by the METU Civil Engineering Society), 1962.
- Betonarme Kesitlerin Taşıma Gücüne Göre Hesabı (Published by METU), 1971. (co-author)
- Betonarme: Temel İlkeler ve Hesap Yöntemleri, 1975. (co-author)
- Betonarmede Burulma, 1975.
- Taşıma Gücü El Kitabı (Published by Ministry of Environment and Urban Planning)
- Introductory Mechanics of Deformable Bodies, (Published by METU), 1983. (co-author)
- Betonarme: Temel İlkeler ve Taşıma Gücü Hesabı, 1985.
- Reinforced Concrete, METU, 1986. (Reviewed in Concrete International, American Concrete Institute)
- Yüksek Yapıların Tasarım ve Yapımında İzlenecek Temel İlkeler (Published by the Chamber of Civil Engineers, İzmir Branch) 1988. (co-author)
- Betonarme 2: Döşeme ve Temeller, 1995.
- Betonarme, 2001. (co-author)

He also wrote nontechnical Turkish books such as recollections.

- "Bir Efsane Bir Demet İnsan", (English: "A Legend, a Bunch of People"), 1995.
- "Bir Zamanlar Mersin'de", (English: "Once Upon in Mersin"), 1997.
- "Ustalarımdan Öğrendiklerim", (English: "What I've Learned from My Masters"), 1999.
- "Sislerin Ardından Kaybolmayanlar", (English: "Those who are not Lost Behind the Mists"), 1999.
- "Bozkırı Yeşertenler", (English: "Steppe Greeners"), 2003.
- "Erguvan Renkli Yıllar", (English: "Judas-Tree Colored Years"), 2004.
- "Gördüklerim, Duyduklarım ve Düşündüklerim", (English: "What I've Seen, Heard and Thought"), 2008.
- "Bozkırı Yeşertenler 2", (English: "Steppe Greeners II"), 2015.
- "Belleğimden Silinmeyenler", (English: "Inkings of Time: Indelible Reminiscences"), 2023.

== Awards ==
1. American Concrete Institute, Wason Medal for Research, with Larry E. Farmer and Phil M. Ferguson, 1969
2. METU Parlar Foundation Science Award, 1985
3. Turkish Prefabricate Union (Turkish: Türk Prefabrik Birliği ) Award, 1992
4. Turkish Education Association Rüştü Yüce Success in Profession Award, 2001
5. University of Texas at Austin Academy of Distinguished Graduates Membership, 2005
6. Turkish Chamber of Civil Engineers, Honorary Distinguished Engineer Award, 2006
7. American Concrete Institute's Highest Honor, ACI Honorary Membership, 2019

His name appeared in Honour Book of Engineers of Distinction published in the United States.
