= TÜBİTAK Marmara Research Center =

Turkish research center

TÜBİTAK Marmara Research Center TÜBİTAK Marmara Araştırma Merkezi
- Abbreviation: TÜBİTAK MAM
- Formation: 1972
- Founder: Nimet Özdaş
- Type: GO
- Purpose: Fundamental and Applied science
- Headquarters: Barış Mah. Dr. Zeki Acar Cad. 1
- Location: Gebze, Kocaeli Province, Turkey
- Coordinates: 40°47′08″N 29°26′57″E
- Chairman: Prof. Dr. İbrahim Dinçer
- Parent organization: Scientific and Technological Research Council of Turkey (TÜBİTAK)
- Website: www.mam.gov.tr/english/index.html

The TÜBİTAK Marmara Research Center (Turkish: TÜBİTAK Marmara Araştırma Merkezi), shortly TÜBİTAK MAM, is a Turkish scientific and technological center carrying out research projects through its subordinate institutes on basic and applied science fields in the area of industrial needs to contribute to the increase of the global competitive power of the country. It was established in 1972 by the Scientific and Technological Research Council of Turkey (Turkish: Türkiye Bilimsel ve Teknolojik Araştırma Kurumu, TÜBİTAK) in Gebze, Kocaeli Province bringing a number of research units of TÜBİTAK formed in the past under one umbrella. The center is currently headed by Prof. Dr. İbrahim Dinçer.

== History ==
Two years after its establishment, TÜBİTAK formed in 1965 the Operational Research Unit at the Middle East Technical University (ODTÜ) in Ankara. Founding of three more research institutions followed in 1968, namely the Electronics Research Institute at ODTÜ, the Materials Research Institute and Applied Mathematics Research Unit at Istanbul Technical University (ITU). In 1970, the Nutrition and Food Technologies Research Unit was formed at Ege University in İzmir.

In the years after 1976, research projects were conducted that were funded by UNIDO and NATO's Science for Stability Program. In the years 1982 and 1984, the number and value of contracted projects took a considerable size. And in 1991, TÜBİTAK MAM started a process of transformation adopting industrial research and development in principle as its main strategy and studies. In 1995, the center achieved a status of more dynamic and half autonomous organization.

In following years, the center underwent structural changes in the organization as a result of expansion of its subordinate research units. Electronics Research Department, National Metrology Institute and Research Institute for Genetic Engineering and Biotechnology grew enough in terms of staff and business volume so that they were reorganized as separate institutes directly reporting to TUBITAK headquarters in Ankara. In July 2006, the Research Institute for Genetic Engineering and Biotechnology was subordinated back to the Marmara Research Center. In the beginning of 2009, the Chemical and Environmental Institute was split in two institutes, namely Chemical Institute and Environment Institute. And finally in 2010, the Information Technologies Institute was transferred into Turkish National Research Institute of Electronics and Cryptology (UEKAE), an institute of TÜBİTAK Informatics and Information Security Research Center (BİLGEM).

== Organization ==
The Marmara Research Center consists of seven institutes as follows:

- Chemistry Institute
- Earth and Marine Sciences Institute
- Energy Institute
- Environment Institute
- Food Institute
- Genetic Engineering and Biotechnology Institute
- Materials Institute

== See also ==
- RV TÜBİTAK Marmara, a research vessel operated by the Environment Institute.
