= TÜBİTAK Informatics and Information Security Research Center =

Turkish scientific research center

TÜBİTAK Informatics and Information Security Research Center TÜBİTAK Bilişim ve Bilgi Güvenliği İleri Teknolojiler Araştırma Merkezi
- Abbreviation: TÜBİTAK BİLGEM
- Formation: 2010
- Type: GO
- Purpose: Fundamental and Applied science
- Location: Gebze, Kocaeli Province, Turkey
- Coordinates: 40°47′09″N 29°26′49″E
- Parent organization: Scientific and Technological Research Council of Turkey (TÜBİTAK)
- Website: bilgem.tubitak.gov.tr/en

The TÜBİTAK Informatics and Information Security Research Center (Turkish: TÜBİTAK Bilişim ve Bilgi Güvenliği İleri Teknolojiler Araştırma Merkezi), shortly TÜBİTAK BİLGEM, is a Turkish scientific and technological center carrying out research projects through its subordinate institutes on various fields of informatics. It was established in 2010 by the Scientific and Technological Research Council of Turkey (Turkish: Türkiye Bilimsel ve Teknolojik Araştırma Kurumu, TÜBİTAK) in Gebze, Kocaeli Province as an umbrella institution of the existing Information Technologies Institute (BTE) and National Research Institute of Electronics and Cryptology (UEKAE) following their transfer from the TÜBİTAK Marmara Research Center.

== History ==
In 2011, the existing Research Institute of Fundamental Sciences (TBAE) was transferred to BİLGEM relocating its facilities as well to the campus in Gebze.

The center established the Research Institute of Software Development (YTE) and the Cyber Security Institute (SGE) in 2012.

== Organization ==
BİLGEM consists of six institutes as following:

- Advanced Technologies Research Institute (İLTAREN)
- Cyber Security Institute (SGE)
- National Research Institute of Electronics and Cryptology (UEKAE)
- Artificial Intelligence Institute (YZE)
- Information Technologies Institute (BTE)
- Research Institute of Software Development (YTE)

== See also ==
- Pardus is a Linux distribution developed by the National Research Institute of Electronics and Cryptology (UEKAE).
