= Chia-Hsiung Tze =

Physicist

- Education: University of Chicago
- Scientific career
- Fields: Theoretical particle physics
- Workplaces: Virginia Tech

Chia-Hsiung Tze (often H.C. Tze) is a professor emeritus at Virginia Tech. He is a theoretical particle physicist focusing on group theory, string theory, supersymmetry, octonions and other topics in theoretical physics.

He was a colleague of the Feza Gürsey.

== Publications ==
=== Articles ===
- N. K. Pak, H. C. Tze (1976). "'t Hooft Bound State Equation: A View from two Gauges". Physical Review D. 14 (12): 3472–3481. Bibcode:1976PhRvD..14.3472P. doi:10.1103/PhysRevD.14.3472.
- N. K. Pak, H. C. Tze (1977). "Axial Anomaly and Chiral Symmetry Breaking in Schwinger Model". Physics Letters B. 71 (2): 333. Bibcode:1977PhLB...71..333P. doi:10.1016/0370-2693(77)90231-3.
- N. K. Pak, H. C. Tze (1979). "Chiral Solitons and Current Algebra". Annals of Physics. 117 (1): 164–194. Bibcode:1979AnPhy.117..164P. doi:10.1016/0003-4916(79)90048-4.

=== Books ===
- Itzhak Bars; Alan Chodos; Chia-Hsiung Tze, eds. (1984). Symmetries in Particle Physics. Plenum Press. ISBN 0-306-41801-0.
- Feza Gürsey, Chia-Hsiung Tze (1996). On the Role of Division, Jordan, and Related Algebras in Particle Physics. World Scientific. ISBN 981-02-2863-5.
