= Harold M. Westergaard =

Danish structural engineer (1888–1950)

Harold Malcolm Westergaard (9 October 1888 in Copenhagen, Denmark – 22 June 1950 in Cambridge, Massachusetts, United States) was a Danish structural engineer. He was Professor of theoretical and applied mechanics at the University of Illinois in Urbana and of Civil Engineering at Harvard.

== Biography ==
Westergaard graduated in engineering from Copenhagen Danmarks Tekniske Højskole in 1911. He continued his practice in reinforced concrete in Hamburg, London, Göttingen, and prepared his written dissertation at Königlich Bayerische Technische Hochschule München in 1915. He obtained a PhD at the University of Illinois Urbana-Champaign in 1916 and was appointed lecturer there for theoretical and applied mechanics. In 1921 he became an assistant professor, associate professor in 1924, and full professor in 1927 at the University of Illinois. For his published paper on the theory of the reinforced concrete, together with W.A. Slater, he received the Wason Medal of the American Concrete Institute (ACI) in 1922.

Westergaard worked as technical expert to the Bureau of Reclamation on the design of Hoover Dam.

In 1936 professor Westergaard was appointed to the Gordon McKay professorship for structural engineering at Harvard University. Between 1937-1946 acted as dean of the Graduate School of Engineering.

== Main Publications ==
- On the resistance of ductile materials to combined stresses in two or three directions perpendicular to one another, (1920)
- Moment and stresses in slabs, (1921)
- Buckling of elastic structures, (1922)
- Anwendung der Statik auf die Ausgleichsrechnung, (1925)
- Stress in concrete pavements computed by theoretical analysis, (1926/1)
- Computation of stresses in concrete roads (1926/2)
- One hundred years advance in structural analysis, (1930/1)
- Computation of stresses in bridge slabs due to wheel loads (1930/2)
- Water pressures on dams during earthquakes, American Society of Civil Engineers (ASCE) (1933)
- General solution of the problem of elastostatics in an n-dimensional homogeneous isotropic solid in an n-dimensional space, (1935)
- Bearing pressures and cracks, (1939)
- Theory of elasticity and plasticity, (1952)
