= Turkish Journal of Electrical Engineering and Computer Sciences =

- Discipline: Electrical and electronics engineering, computer science
- Language: English
- Edited by: Muhammet Uzuntarla

Publication details
- History: 1993–present
- Publisher: TÜBİTAK
- Frequency: 7/year
- Open access: yes
- License: CC BY 4.0
- Impact factor: 2.1 (2025)

Standard abbreviations
- ISO 4: Turk. J. Electr. Eng. Comput. Sci.

Indexing
- ISSN: 1300-0632 (print); 1303-6203 (web)
- LCCN: 2009251218
- OCLC no.: 320960523

Links
- Journal homepage; Online access

Turkish Journal of Electrical Engineering and Computer Sciences is a peer-reviewed scientific journal published by Scientific and Technological Research Council of Turkey (TÜBİTAK). Being a diamond open access journal, it covers all areas of electrical engineering and computer science. Its editor-in-chief is Muhammet Uzuntarla (Gebze Technical University).

== Abstracting and indexing ==
The journal is abstracted and indexed in:

- Inspec
- ProQuest databases
- Science Citation Index Expanded
- Scopus

According to the Journal Citation Reports, the journal has a 2025 impact factor of 2.1.
