= Feza Gürsey Institute =

Turkish physics research institute

Feza Gürsey Institute (Turkish: Feza Gürsey Enstitüsü) is a joint institute of Boğaziçi University and the Scientific and Technological Research Council of Turkey (TÜBİTAK) on physics research, founded in 1983 by Erdal İnönü with the name Research Institute for Basic Sciences. It continues as the Feza Gürsey Institute, renamed in honor of Feza Gürsey. The institute is located within the Kandilli Campus of the Boğaziçi University in Istanbul, Turkey. Currently, it hosts researchers in mathematics and theoretical physics.
