= Turkish Journal of Physics =

- Discipline: Physics
- Language: English
- Edited by: Oğuz Gülseren

Publication details
- Former names: Doğa Bilim Dergisi (1976–1980); Doğa Bilim Dergisi, Seri A: Temel Bilimler (1980–1984); Doğa Bilim Dergisi, Seri A1: Matematik, Fizik, Kimya ve Astronomi (1984–1985); Doğa: Turk Fizik ve Astrofizik Dergisi (1986–1988); Doğa: Turkish Journal of Physics (1988–1993)
- History: 1976–present
- Publisher: TÜBİTAK
- Frequency: Bimonthly
- Open access: yes
- License: CC BY 4.0
- Impact factor: 1.4 (2024)

Standard abbreviations
- ISO 4: Turk. J. Phys.

Indexing
- CODEN: TJPHEY
- ISSN: 1300-0101 (print); 1303-6122 (web)
- LCCN: 94648679
- OCLC no.: 320960523

Links
- Journal homepage; Online access

Turkish Journal of Physics is a peer-reviewed scientific journal published bimonthly by Scientific and Technological Research Council of Turkey (TÜBİTAK). Being a diamond open access journal, it covers all areas of physics. Its editor-in-chief is Oğuz Gülseren (Bilkent University).

The journal was established in 1976 under the name Doğa Bilim Dergisi, covering different branches of natural sciences. It was subsequently split into multiple journals. The physics edition, Doğa: Turk Fizik ve Astrofizik Dergisi, was established in 1986; it was retitled as Turkish Journal of Physics in 1993.

== Abstracting and indexing ==
The journal is abstracted and indexed in:

- EBSCO databases
- Ei Compendex
- Inspec
- Science Citation Index Expanded
- Scopus

According to the Journal Citation Reports, the journal has a 2024 impact factor of 1.4.
