= Turkish Journal of Mathematics =

- Discipline: Mathematics
- Language: English
- Edited by: Adnan Tercan

Publication details
- History: 1976–present
- Publisher: Scientific and Technological Research Council of Turkey (Turkey)
- Frequency: Bi-monthly
- Impact factor: 1.1 (2025)

Standard abbreviations
- ISO 4: Turk. J. Math.
- MathSciNet: Turkish J. Math.

Indexing
- ISSN: 1300-0098 (print); 1303-6149 (web)
- LCCN: 94648744
- OCLC no.: 30623123

Links
- Journal homepage; Online access

Turkish Journal of Mathematics is open-access, peer-reviewed academic journal published electronically and bimonthly by the Scientific and Technological Research Council of Turkey (TÜBITAK). The goal of the journal is to improve the research culture and help knowledge spread rapidly in the academic world by providing a common academic platform. All manuscripts published in Turkish Journal of Mathematics are licensed under CC BY 4.0 (Creative Commons license). The submission and publication is free of charge. It is published in English and available online for free at http://journals.tubitak.gov.tr and http://dergipark.gov.tr/.

The journal is indexed by Science Citation Index Expanded (SCI-E), trdizin and Zentralblatt MATH. Its 2025 impact factor was 1.1.
