= Turkish Journal of Chemistry =

- Discipline: Chemistry
- Language: English
- Edited by: Ahmet Gül

Publication details
- History: 1977-present
- Publisher: TÜBITAK (Turkey)
- Frequency: Bimonthly
- Open access: Yes
- License: CC-BY 4.0
- Impact factor: 1.239 (2020)

Standard abbreviations
- ISO 4: Turk. J. Chem.

Indexing
- CODEN: TJCHE3
- ISSN: 1300-0527 (print); 1303-6130 (web)
- LCCN: 98648002
- OCLC no.: 423564261

Links
- Journal homepage; Online access; Online archive

The Turkish Journal of Chemistry is a bimonthly peer-reviewed open access scientific journal covering research in chemistry. It was established in 1977 and is published by the Scientific and Technological Research Council of Turkey (TÜBITAK). The editor-in-chief is Ahmet Gül (Istanbul Technical University).

== Abstracting and indexing ==
The journal is abstracted and indexed in:

- Chemical Abstracts Service
- Current Contents/Physical, Chemical & Earth Sciences
- EBSCO databases
- ProQuest databases
- Science Citation Index Expanded
- Scopus

According to the Journal Citation Reports, the journal has a 2019 impact factor of 0.981.
