= Reşit Süreyya Gürsey =

Turkish writer and intellectual (1889–1962)

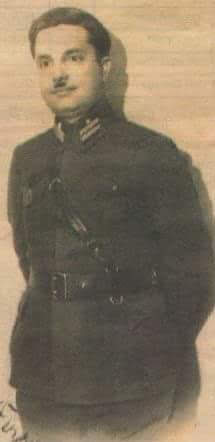
- Born: Ahmet Reşit; 1889; Bor, Ottoman Empire
- Died: 1962 (aged 72–73); United States
- Education: School of Medicine; Sorbonne University; University of Cambridge
- Occupations: M.D., teacher, poet
- Notable work: Books, essays
- Spouse: Remziye Hisar (m. 1920–1930)
- Children: Feza Gürsey; Deha Gürsey Owens
- Parent: Hasan Hüsnü - Zekiye

Reşit Süreyya Gürsey (1889–1962) was a Turkish intellectual who was a medical doctor, a radiology expert, a physicist and a poet.

== Life ==
He was born to Zekiye in Bor of Niğde Province during the Ottoman Empire era. His father Hasan Hüsnü was a sea captain in the Ottoman navy. His primary school education was in Crete (now an island in Greece) and secondary education was in Mersin. He enrolled in a military school in Istanbul. In 1908 he transferred to military medicine school. In 1914 he graduated as a military doctor. Next year he served in the mobile hospital during the Gallipoli campaign. In 1918 he travelled to Azerbaijan which experienced a brief independence after World War I. In Baku he served as a physics teacher. He returned to Turkey to serve in the Turkish War of Independence. After the war he resumed his career in Niğde and Ankara. Then he traveled abroad to study radiology in France (Sorbonne University) and United Kingdom (University of Cambridge). Marie Curie, Paul Langevin and J.J Thomson were among his teachers. He returned to Turkey as a radiology expert. However he preferred teaching. Following a brief service in Turhal and Tokat, he was appointed as the physics teacher in Kuleli Military High School in Istanbul. After his early retirement in 1935, he traveled to Germany and Austria for advanced physics career where Werner Heisenberg and Erwin Schrödinger were his teachers. Although he was enrolled during World War II in which Turkey experienced a mobilized neutrality, after the war he traveled to the United States. In an interview on 30 March 1946, Reşit Süreyya announced that he gave up medicine and his main interests were mathematics, physics and literature. He complained that his works and ideas were not appreciated in Turkey and that's why he decided to go aboard. He died on 27 August 1962 in the United States.

== Family ==
His wife was Remziye Hisar, the first woman chemist of Turkey. They married in 1919 in Baku, but divorced in 1930. His son Feza Gürsey was a leading physicist of Turkey and her daughter Deha Gürsey Owen was the sole Turkish member of International Psychology association.

== Scientific and technical books ==
Reşit Süreyya’s scientific and technological books were

- Radyumla Tedâvi (Radiation therapy)
- Riyâziye Esasları (Basics of mathematics)
- Fizik Meseleleri (Physics Problems)
- Fizik Bakaloryası (Physics Baccalauréat problems)
- Harp Zehirleri Kimyası (Chemistry of the poisons of the War)
- Top ve Mermi Sesleri (Cannon and Bullet sounds)
- Sesle Mevzi Tayini Aletleri (Acoustic location tools)

== Literature ==
Reşit Süreyya was also a poet and a satirist. He published his first poem in the literary periodical Aşiyan in 1908. He wrote in several literary magazines both in Istanbul and Baku. His literary books were the following:

- Edebiyât-ı Cedide (New literature, 1912)
- Bir Tılsımın Nakışları (Embroidery of magic, 1929)
- Geceden Şarkılar (Songs from the Night, 1941)
