= Pardus (operating system) =

Turkish Linux distribution

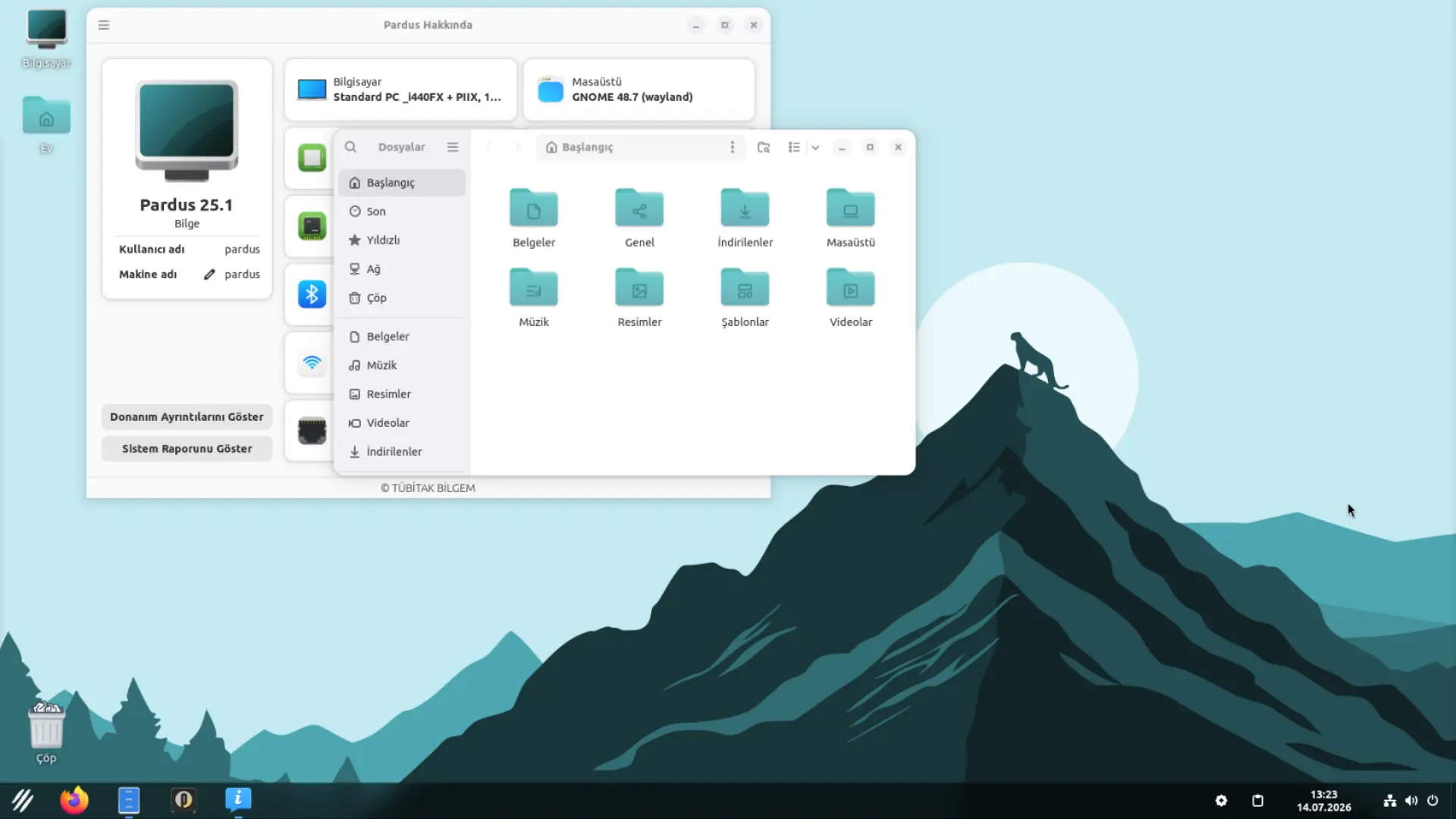
- Pardus 25.1 Gnome desktop screenshot
- Developer: Scientific and Technological Research Council of Turkey (TÜBİTAK)
- OS family: Linux (Unix-like)
- Working state: Current
- Source model: Free Software (Copyleft); Open-source software
- Latest release: 25.0 (25 November 2025; 11 months ago) [±]
- Available in: Turkish, English
- Kernel type: Monolithic kernel
- Default user interface: Xfce; GNOME; Pardus ETAP
- License: GPL v2
- Official website: www.pardus.org.tr

Pardus is a Linux distribution developed with support from the government of Turkey. Pardus' main focus is office-related work including use in Turkish government agencies. Despite that, Pardus ships in several languages. Its ease of use and availability free of charge has spawned numerous communities throughout the world.

== Development ==
Pardus was started by Turkish National Research Institute of Electronics and Cryptology (UEKAE), a division of the Scientific and Technological Research Council of Turkey (TÜBİTAK), in 2003.

The first live CD version of Pardus was a fork of Gentoo Linux in 2005. TÜBİTAK later decided to continue development of Pardus based on the stable branch of Debian from 2013. The abandoned independent Linux distribution was however continued by volunteers under the name PiSi Linux.
