= Paul Pascal =

French painter

- Born: 1839; Toulouse, France
- Died: 1905 (age 66/67); Washington, D.C.
- Education: École des Beaux-Arts, Paris
- Known for: Painter
- Movement: Orientalist

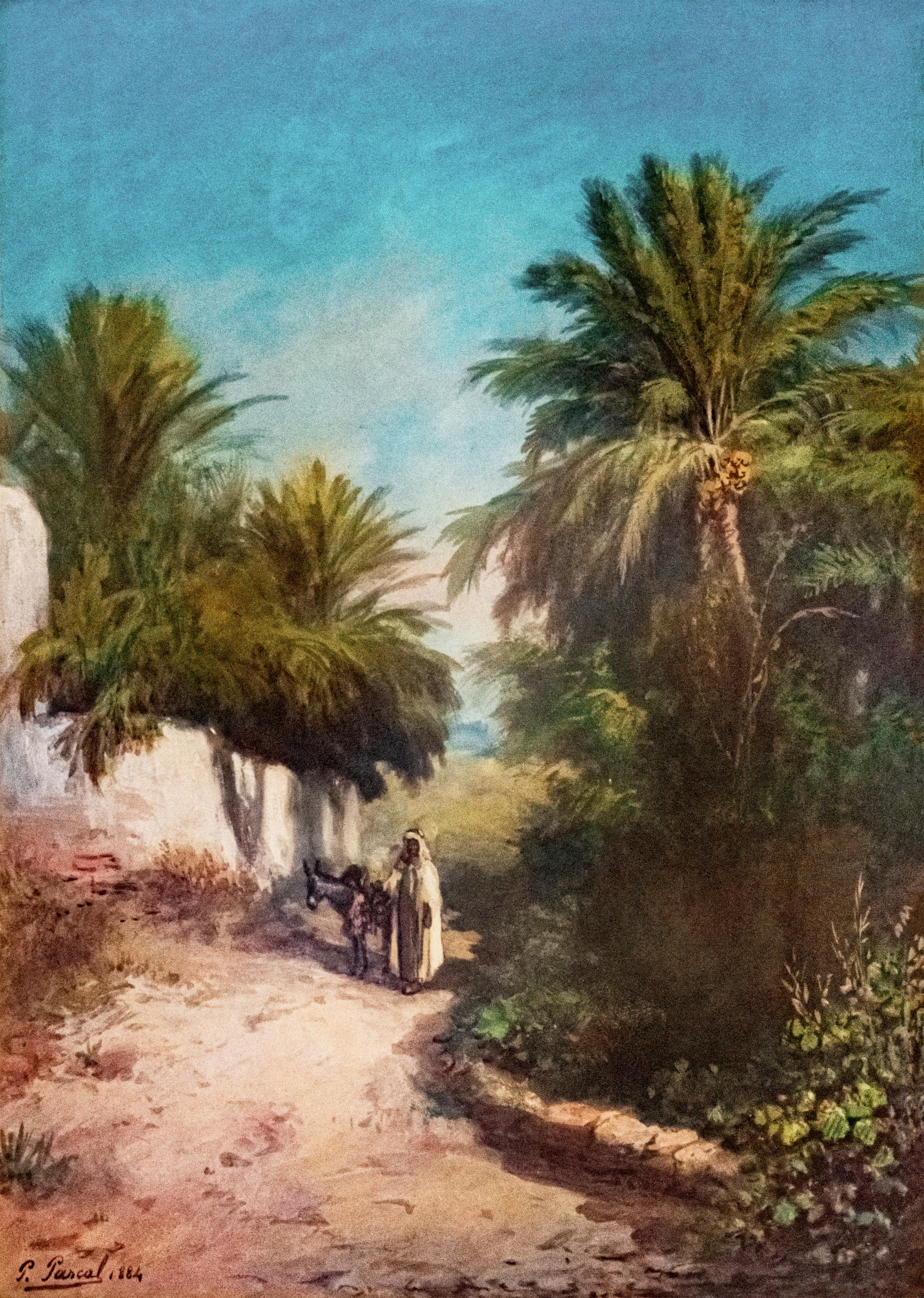
Paysage oriental (Eastern landscape) - Musée des Beaux-Arts de Narbonne

Paul Pascal (1839–1905) was a French landscape painter. He did landscape paintings of the Middle East and the Mediterranean coast with gouache. After he emigrated to the United States in 1893, he did paintings of the American wilderness with Native Americans. His artwork is exhibited in museums in France.

== Early life ==
Paul Pascal was born in 1839 Toulouse, France. His family were ébénistes (cabinet-makers). He grew up in North Africa.

Pascal graduated from the École des Beaux-Arts in Madrid.

== Career ==
Pascal began his career as a painter in Toulouse in the 1870s. By the 1880s, he moved to Paris, where he became a landscape painter. He mostly did landscapes of the Middle East, but also Italy, the Mediterranean coast and the Pyrenees. He only painted with gouache.

Pascal emigrated to the United States in 1893. He continued to do landscape paintings, including some depicting Native Americans.

== Death and legacy ==
Pascal died in poverty in 1905 in Washington, D.C.

His paintings are exhibited at the Musée Paul Dupuy in Toulouse, the Musée des Beaux-Arts de Narbonne, and the Beaux Arts Museum in Agen. They were also auctioned by Bonhams, Sotheby's, and Christie's.
