= Kuzgun (rocket family) =

Turkish rocket family

Kuzgun is a Turkish weapons family developed by TÜBİTAK-SAGE than can be launched from land, maritime surface, and air.

It should not be confused with the loitering UAV STM Kuzgun from STM Defence.

The munition family has three main variants of delivery:

- Kuzgun-SS, free-gliding missile; it uses GPS/INS for navigation and SAL/IIR for the terminal guidance. (SS: Serbest Süzülen Free Soaring)
- Kuzgun-KY, solid-propellant rocket-powered missile; it uses GPS/INS for navigation and SAL/CMOS/DUAL for the terminal guidance
- Kuzgun-TJ, turbojet-powered missile; it uses GPS/INS for navigation and SAL/IIR for the terminal guidance.

Seeker head options include semi-active laser seeker, infrared image seeker, and day vision seeker.

Kuzgun KY was revealed during IDEF 2021 as the third variant, after the SS and TJ.

== Other developments ==
In addition, there is Bozok, a mini version of Kuzgun, specifically designed for UAVs.

Under the development is Kuzgun-EW, which will be able to carry miniaturised EW payload which will act as a stand-in jammer and suppress enemy air defences to significantly increase the survivability of the aircraft of the Turkish Air Force.
