= RV TÜBİTAK Marmara =

History

Turkey
- Name: TÜBİTAK Marmara
- Owner: Scientific and Technological Research Council of Turkey (TÜBİTAK)
- Operator: Marine Research Center
- Builder: Çeksan Shipyard
- Launched: February 17, 2013
- Home port: Istanbul
- Identification: IMO number: 9633355; MMSI number: 271043343; Callsign: TCVK2
- Status: Active as of 2018

General characteristics
- Class & type: Oceanographic research ship
- Tonnage: 500 GT
- Length: 41.20 m (135 ft 2 in)
- Beam: 9.55 m (31 ft 4 in)
- Draft: 4.50 m (14 ft 9 in)
- Installed power: 2 x 1,040 kW (1,390 hp)
- Speed: 14 knots (26 km/h; 16 mph)
- Crew: 12
- Armament: None

RV TÜBİTAK Marmara is a Turkish research vessel owned by the Scientific and Technological Research Council of Turkey (TÜBİTAK) and operated by its newly established Marine Research Center for oceanographic research studies.

The vessel was designed by Soyaslan Marine, indigenously developed and built at the Çeksan Shipyard in Tuzla, Istanbul to a cost of ₺ 13.8 million. She was launched on February 17, 2013, in presence of Minister of Science, Industry and Technology Nihat Ergün, Minister of Development Cevdet Yılmaz, Governor of Istanbul Hüseyin Avni Mutlu and President of TÜBİTAK Yücel Altunbaşak. She is the first ever research vessel built in Turkey.

It is planned that the vessel will be fitted until the end of May 2013 with all the necessary advanced-technology instruments and equipment. After commissioning, the research ship will be used in the seas around Turkey, primarily in the Turkish Straits, to study marine pollution, to research on marine biology, to explore underwater oil fields, to monitor underwater faults and underwater pipelines as well as to give support in case of marine incidents and disasters. She will be capable of carrying out those studies in a depth of up to 3,000 m (9,800 ft).

On board of the RV TÜBİTAK Marmara with twelve crew, eleven scientists will work in three laboratories.

== Characteristics ==
TÜBİTAK Marmara is 41.20 m (135 ft 2 in) long, with a beam of 9.55 m (31 ft 4 in) and a max. draft of 4.50 m (14 ft 9 in). Assessed at 500 GT, the ship is propelled by two 1,040 kW (1,390 hp) diesel engines. She has a speed of 14 knots (26 km/h; 16 mph) in service.

== See also ==
- List of research vessels of Turkey
