= Turkish National Research Institute of Electronics and Cryptology =

Turkish scientific organization

- Ulusal Elektronik ve Kriptoloji Araştırma Enstitüsü
- Abbreviation: TÜBİTAK UEKAE
- Formation: 1994
- Founder: Yılmaz Tokad
- Type: GO
- Purpose: Electronics and cryptology
- Location: Gebze, Kocaeli Province, Turkey
- Coordinates: 40°47′09″N 29°26′49″E
- Parent organization: TÜBİTAK Informatics and Information Security Research Center (BİLGEM)
- Website: www.uekae.tubitak.gov.tr

The Turkish National Research Institute of Electronics and Cryptology of Turkey (Turkish: Ulusal Elektronik ve Kriptoloji Araştırma Enstitüsü), shortly UEKAE, is a national scientific organization with the aim of developing advanced technologies for information security. UEKAE is the most prominent and also the founder (first) institute of the TÜBİTAK.

The institute was founded by Yılmaz Tokad, professor at ITU (Istanbul Technical University), and four researchers under his supervision in the building of engineering at METU (Middle East Technical University) in 1972, with the name Electronic Research Unit. In 1995 the institute's name has become National Research Institute of Electronics and Cryptology and moved to Gebze, Kocaeli.

== Affiliates and facilities ==
It is affiliated with the TÜBİTAK Informatics and Information Security Research Center (BİLGEM), which is bound to Scientific and Technological Research Council of Turkey (TUBİTAK). The institute was later reorganized as the prime institute of the BİLGEM in the Gebze, Kocaeli Province campus of TÜBİTAK.

The institute consists of facilities on fields and for products as follows:

- Semiconductor Technologies Research Laboratory (YITAL)
- Cryptanalysis Center
- EMC/Tempest Test Center
- Speech and Language Technologies
- Software Development
- Surveillance Systems
- Communication and Information Security
- Electro-Optics Laboratory
- Spectrum Analysis and Management
- Open Source Software
- Government Cerficiation Authority (KSM)
- NATO Certified Products

== See also ==
- TÜBİTAK Informatics and Information Security Research Center (TÜBİTAK BİLGEM)
- Scientific and Technological Research Council of Turkey (TÜBİTAK)
- Turkish Academy of Sciences (TÜBA)
- Turkish Atomic Energy Authority (TAEK)
- Pardus, a Linux distribution
