= Feza Gürsey =

Turkish mathematician and physicist

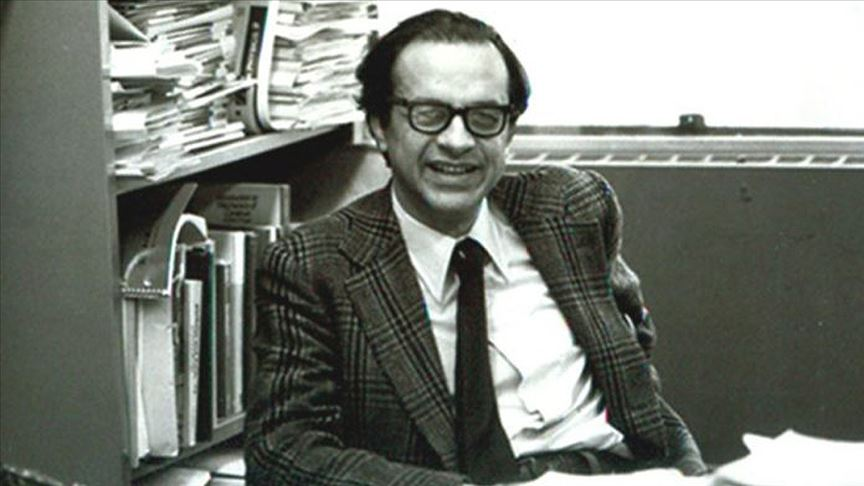
- Born: April 7, 1921; Istanbul
- Died: April 13, 1992 (aged 71); New Haven, Connecticut
- Education: Istanbul University (BS); Imperial College London (PhD)
- Known for: Chiral model; SU(6); Gürsey-Radicati mass formula
- Parents: Reşit Süreyya Gürsey; Remziye Hisar
- Scientific career
- Fields: Mathematical physics
- Workplaces: University of Cambridge; Brookhaven National Laboratory; Institute for Advanced Study; Columbia University; Middle East Technical University; Yale University; Boğaziçi University
- Thesis: Applications of Quaternions to Field Equations (1950)
- Doctoral advisor: Harry Jones
- Doctoral students: Itzhak Bars; Metin Gürses; Pierre Sikivie; Atsushi Higuchi

Feza Gürsey (Turkish pronunciation: [ˈfeza ˈɟyɾsej]; April 7, 1921 – April 13, 1992) was a Turkish mathematician and physicist. Among his contributions to theoretical physics, his work on the chiral model and on SU(6) symmetry of the quark model are the most well-known.

== Early life ==
Feza Gürsey was born on April 7, 1921, in Istanbul, to Reşit Süreyya Gürsey, a military physician, and Remziye Hisar, a chemist and a pioneering Turkish scientist. He graduated from Galatasaray High School in 1940, and received his degree in Mathematics – Physics from Istanbul University in 1944.

== Career ==
Through a scholarship from the Turkish Ministry of Education he received while he was an assistant in Istanbul University, he pursued a doctorate degree at the Imperial College London in the United Kingdom. He completed his work on the application of quaternions to quantum field theory in 1950. After spending the period from 1950 to 1951 in postdoctoral research at Cambridge University, he worked as an assistant at Istanbul University, where he married Suha Pamir, also a physics assistant, in 1952, and in 1953 he acquired the title of associate professor.

During 1957–1961 he worked at Brookhaven National Laboratory, Institute for Advanced Study in Princeton, New Jersey, and Columbia University. In 1960s, he worked on the nonlinear chiral Lagrangian, and produced results of relevance to quantum chromodynamics.

Returning to Turkey in 1961, he accepted the title of professor from Middle East Technical University (METU) and took part in the establishment of METU Department of Theoretical Physics. Continuing his work as a lecturer at METU until 1974, he formed a research group.

Being offered a position at Yale University in 1965, he started to work in both Yale University and METU, until 1974, when he decided to give up his position in METU and settle in the United States to continue with Yale. During these years, he took part in the formulation of E(6) Grand Unified Theories.

== Death and legacy ==
Gürsey died in 1992, in New Haven, Connecticut. He is survived by his son, Yusuf Gürsey. The Feza Gürsey Institute, founded by the joint effort of Boğaziçi University and TÜBİTAK in Turkey, is named in his honor.

Edward Witten notes:

Feza Gürsey was one of the most respected members of the physics community and his untimely death on April 13, 1992 was a great loss to theoretical physics. He will always be remembered for his many seminal and deep contributions to theoretical physics as well as for his kindness, civility and scholarship. For those of us who knew him he epitomized a style of physics and an epoch in the history of physics.

Feza's scientific work is marked with remarkable originality and elegance as well as intellectual courage. He never hesitated to pick problems that were not fashionable. He worked at them in depth, planting seeds that in some cases developed into whole branches of our discipline. Outstanding examples would include his conception of the pion in terms of spontaneously broken chiral symmetry, and his contributions to the introduction of exceptional gauge groups for grand unification. To the end of his life he was tackling the most difficult problems, planting new seeds in unknown soil.

In the early part of his career, Gürsey studied the conformal group and conformally invariant quantum field theories, concepts whose role in physics are now central. This developed into his long and multifaceted interest in the unitary representations of non-compact groups and their applications to space-time. In the late fifties he did his work on Pauli-Gürsey transformations and later introduced the non-linear chiral Lagrangian, one of his most seminal contributions to theoretical physics. Chiral symmetry and non-linear realizations of symmetry groups have since become an integral part of theoretical physics. In the 1960s, Feza became well known for his work on the SU(6) symmetry that combines the unitary spin SU(3) of the eightfold way with non-relativistic spin degrees of freedom of quarks. Subsequent attempts to understand the origin of SU(6) symmetry led to the introduction of the color degrees of freedom of quarks. Feza's introduction in the mid-1970s of the grand unified theory based on the exceptional group E6 -which has continued to fascinate theoretical physicists ever since- was one facet of his long interest in the possible role of quaternions and octonions in physics. This interest also led to Feza's work on quaternion analyticity, which continued practically to the end of his life.

Feza was an exceptionally inspiring teacher. He trained many Ph.D students who now hold academic positions in numerous countries of the world. Throughout his life he retained a youthful spirit and was always enthusiastic about learning new things. He had a special rapport with the young people and enjoyed their company.

Reminiscing only about Feza Gürsey the physicist would not do full justice to him. He was a very cultured man who distilled the essential and sublime elements of Western and Turkish cultures and synthesized them into a singularly unique whole in his personality and wisdom. One could have deep and penetrating discussions with him on the music of Franz Schubert and Dede Efendi, on the poetry of Yunus Emre and Goethe, on the novels of Thomas Mann and Marcel Proust, on the paintings of Van Gogh and Giotto, in short, on essentially any subject of depth and beauty.

The Gürsey Memorial Conferences that are to be held biannually are hopefully a fitting way to pay tribute to his memory. We hope that these will be conferences that Gürsey himself would have enjoyed! His memory will always be with those of us who were his friends and colleagues.

— Strings and Symmetries, Proceedings, Istanbul, Turkey, 1994, Aktas et al.

== Publications ==
- (With Chia-Hsiung Tze) On the Role of Division, Jordan, and Related Algebras in Particle Physics (1996), ISBN 981-02-2863-5

== Awards and honors ==
- 1969 Scientific and Technological Research Council of Turkey (TÜBİTAK) Science Award
- 1977 J. Robert Oppenheimer Memorial Prize together with Sheldon Glashow
- 1977 A. Cressey Morrison Prize together with R. Griffiths in Natural Sciences
- 1981 Collège de France Award
- 1983 Honorary title of "Commendatore" by the Italian Government
- 1986 Wigner Medal administered by the Group Theory and Fundamental Physics Foundation
- 1989 Award of Association of Turkish-American Scientists and Engineers
- 1989 METU Parlar Foundation Science Award
- 1990 Galatasaray Foundation Award

The Feza Gürsey Institute in Istanbul and Feza Gürsey Science Center in Ankara are named in his honor. Boğaziçi University maintains a Feyza Gürsey Archive. His bronze likeness can be encountered at a number of places in Turkey, for example a sculpture by Charlotte Langlands is present at the Nesin Mathematics Village.
