= Turkish Academy of Sciences =

Turkish scholarly society

- Türkiye Bilimler Akademisi, TÜBA

Agency overview
- Formed: September 2, 1993; 32 years ago
- Type: Academy of Science
- Jurisdiction: Turkey
- Status: Autonomous
- Headquarters: Çankaya, Ankara
- Employees: 205 (Academy Members)
- Annual budget: 15.986.000 TL
- Agency executive: Muzaffer Şeker
- Website: tuba.gov.tr/en

The Turkish Academy of Sciences (Turkish: Türkiye Bilimler Akademisi – TÜBA) is an autonomous scholarly association aimed at promoting scientific activities in Turkey. Although it is attached to the office of the Presidency and is largely funded by the government, it maintains financial and administrative autonomy. The academy is headquartered in Ankara.

In addition to conferring awards and fellowships to distinguished scientists, the academy is also responsible with determining scientific priority areas and proposing policies and needed changes in legislation to the government. The implementation and management of actual research programmes is carried out by TÜBİTAK.

Traditionally, the academy elected its own members, but beginning in November 2011 one third of the members are assigned by the Council of Ministers and one third are assigned by TÜBİTAK. Rest of the members are elected by the owners of the academy. As a response, 70 of the existing members of the academy resigned and founded another association, the Science Academy Society of Turkey. TÜBA is a member of the International Council for Science.

== History ==
The Turkish Academy of Sciences, was officially established in 1993 as an independent national academy encompassing all fields of science. This culmination was the result of a long-standing tradition of academic institutions in Turkey, dating back to the late Ottoman period. Early examples of scientific academic institutions include the Sahn-ı Seman Medrese during the reign of Sultan Mehmed II and the Encümen-i Daniş, which was established in 1851 as the first Turkish Science Academy in the modern sense. Encümen-i Daniş, modeled after the French Academy of Sciences, was a pioneering committee tasked with preparing textbooks for the Darülfünûn, a university planned to be founded in the following years. Another significant institution was the Cemiyet-i İlmiye-i Osmaniye, founded in 1861 during the Tanzimat, which published the first scientific journal, Mecmua-i Fünûn, but was closed in 1866.

This tradition of educational reform dates back to January 10, 1845, when Sultan Abdülmecid issued a decree leading to the establishment of the Temporary Education Council (Turkish: Meclis-i Maarif-i Muvakkat) on April 11, 1845. The council was responsible for devising the necessary educational reforms and in July 1846, reported their findings to the Meclis-i Vâlâ, which was tasked with preparing the legislative texts. Among the council's decisions was the proposal to establish Darülfünun in Istanbul and the formation of the Encümen-i Daniş to prepare the university's curriculum. This committee, which included notable members such as Austrian orientalist Joseph von Hammer-Purgstall, English lexicographer James Redhouse, and French orientalist Thomas Bianchi, was inaugurated on July 18, 1851, with a ceremony attended by Sultan Abdülmecid and Grand Vizier Mustafa Reşit Paşa. The ceremony also marked the presentation of the committee's first work, the Kavaid-i Osmaniyye, an Ottoman Turkish grammar book.

The foundation of the Tarih-i Osmanî Encümeni in 1909 and the establishment of the Turkish Language Association and the Turkish Historical Society in 1932 further exemplified the evolution of academy-like organizations in Turkey through the Ottoman and Republican periods. TÜBA itself was formalized under Statutory Decree No. 497, coming into effect on September 2, 1993. After the appointment of its founding members by the Prime Minister, the academy's initial general assembly was convened, the chairman and academy council members were elected, and operations officially began on January 7, 1994.

== Mission ==
The Turkish Academy of Sciences is responsible for conducting research and providing consultations on scientific topics and priorities. It aims to promote scientific approaches and thinking within society and proposes legislative changes to enhance the social status, living standards, incomes, and special privileges of Turkish scientists and researchers. Additionally, TÜBA works to increase public appreciation of science and encourages the scientific community through awards.

TÜBA's initiatives and projects encompass a wide range of areas including Science Education, the Outstanding Young Scientists Award Program (GEBİP), Scientific Monograph Awards (TESEP), TÜBA International Academy Awards, and Turkish-Islamic Scientific Cultural Heritage. The academy also focuses on compiling Turkish Scientific Terminology Dictionaries, developing Open Course Materials, and conducting Cultural Inventory studies. Through its academy and University Conferences, TÜBA facilitates discussions and research on various topics like Science and Education Policies, Cancer, Stem Cells, Food and Nutrition, and Energy. It regularly produces both periodic and non-periodic publications.

In terms of international relations and science diplomacy, TÜBA maintains bilateral cooperation agreements with over 30 national academies and holds memberships in more than ten global, continental, and regional umbrella organizations such as IAP, ISC, S-20, ALLEA, AASSA, and the Union of Academies of the Turkic World. These partnerships frame TÜBA's activities in international relations and science diplomacy.

== Membership ==
The academy features three types of membership: full members, associate members, and honorary members. The number of full members, who are professors actively working in Turkey, cannot exceed two percent of the total number of qualified professionals in the country. The number of associate members is capped at half the upper limit set for full members. Members are selected by the General Assembly of the academy. There is no limit on the number of honorary memberships.

Both full and associate members are required to submit annual reports to the Academy Council at the end of each year. These reports detail their research activities conducted during the year and outline their planned research for the following year.

== Membership selection ==
The criteria for membership selection in the academy are as follows:

1. Full Members are selected from among distinguished scientists with Turkish citizenship who meet the following conditions:
  - Have received awards or medals from nationally or internationally respected organizations.
  - Are credited with discoveries, inventions, theories, or models named after them and/or are mentioned in classic books or review articles.
  - Have received a high number of citations in international scientific citation indexes, recognized globally.
2. Associate Members are selected from among talented young scientists with Turkish citizenship who are candidates for full membership.
3. Honorary Members are chosen from Turkish scientists who meet the criteria for full membership but are ineligible due to age limits, as well as foreign scientists who meet the criteria required of full members.

== Presidents ==
- 1996-2000 Ayhan O. Çavdar
- 2000-2008 Engin Bermek
- 2008-2012 Yücel Kanpolat
- 2012-2019 Ahmet Cevat Acar
- 2019- Muzaffer Şeker

== See also ==
- Scientific and Technological Research Council of Turkey (TÜBİTAK)
- The Science Academy Society of Turkey
