= Scientific and Technological Research Council of Turkey =

Research and development Institution of the government of Turkey

- Türkiye Bilimsel ve Teknolojik Araştırma Kurumu, TÜBİTAK

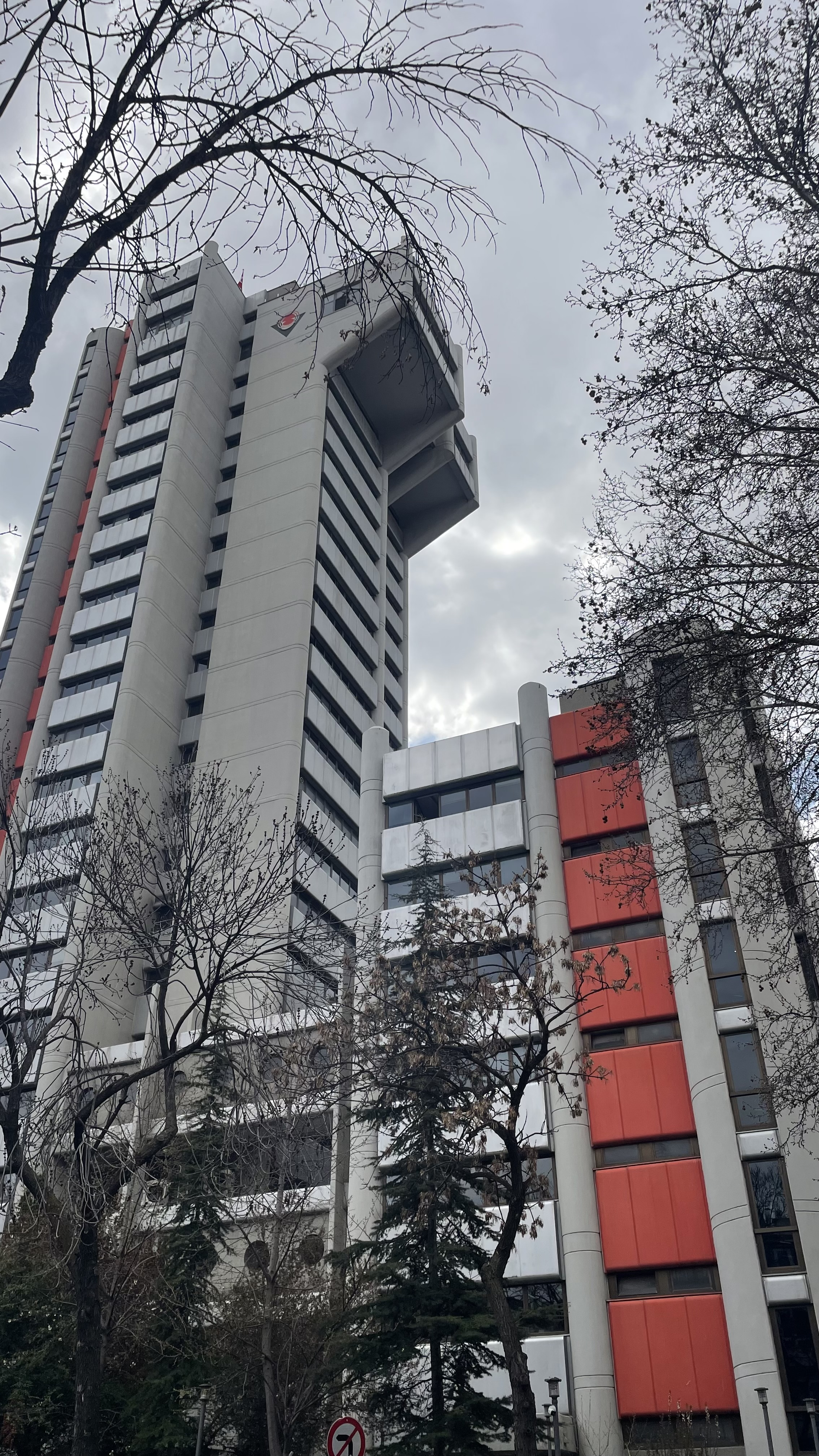

Agency overview
- Formed: 1963; 63 years ago
- Jurisdiction: Republic of Turkey
- Headquarters: Ankara
- Annual budget: 3,197,036,000 TL
- Agency executive: Orhan Aydın
- Website: tubitak.gov.tr

The Scientific and Technological Research Council of Turkey (Turkish: Türkiye Bilimsel ve Teknolojik Araştırma Kurumu, TÜBİTAK) is a national agency of Turkey whose stated goal is to develop "science, technology and innovation" (STI) policies, support and conduct research and development, and to "play a leading role in the creation of a science and technology culture" in the country.

TÜBİTAK develops scientific and technological policies and manages R&D institutes, carrying on research, technology and development studies in line with "national priorities". TÜBİTAK also acts as an advisory agency to the Turkish government and acts as the secretariat of the Supreme Council for Science and Technology, the highest science and technology policymaking body in Turkey.

== History ==
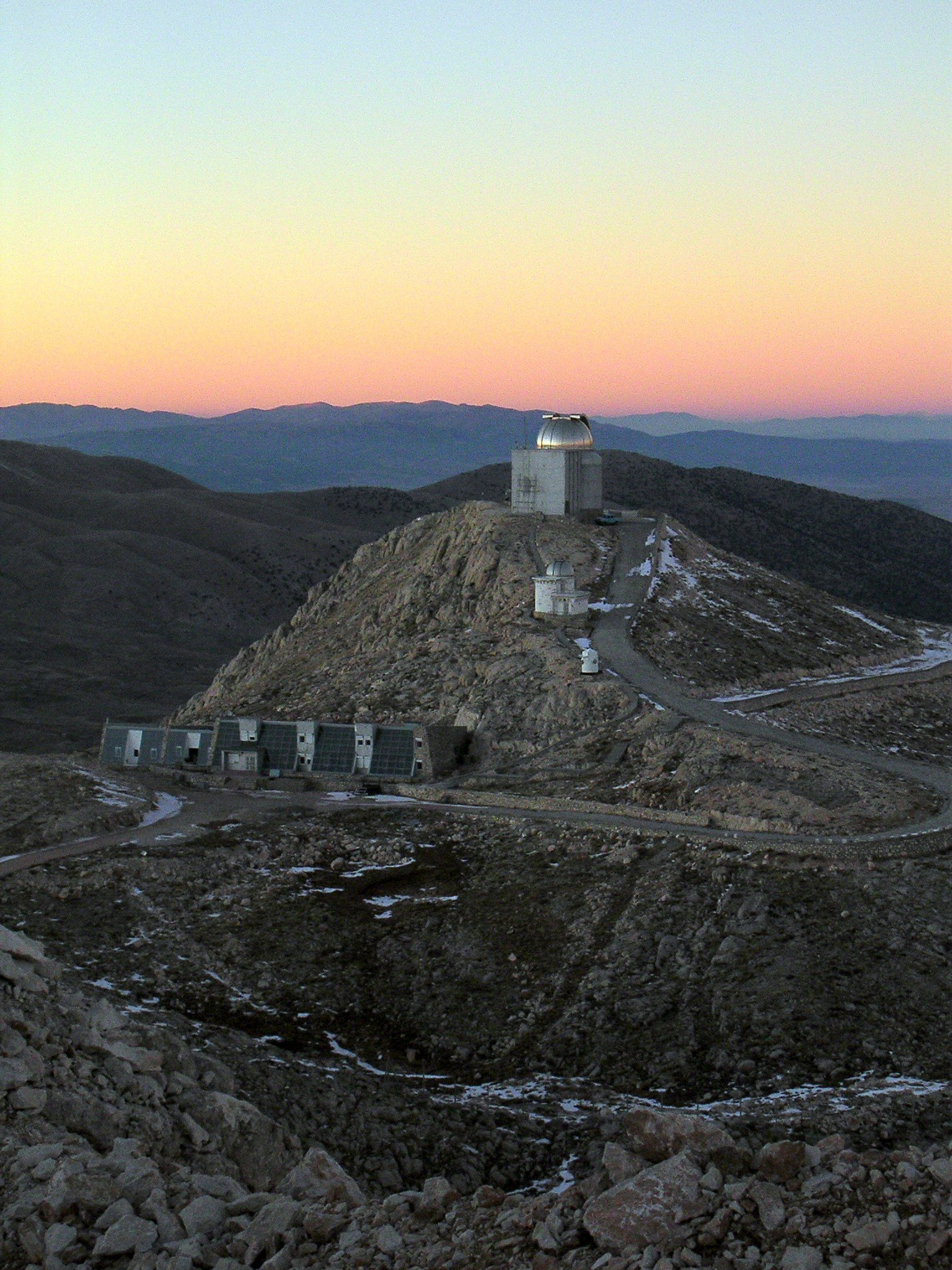
National Observatory of TÜBİTAK

TÜBİTAK was established by President Cemal Gürsel, who initially formed a scientific council in 1960 to advise the Ministry of Defense. This effort paralleled the creation of a separate scientific law council tasked with drafting the new constitution of the Turkish Republic. President Gürsel later expanded this initiative by founding the Scientific and Technological Research Council of Turkey as a broader continuation of the Ministry of Defense's Scientific Council. The primary role of TÜBİTAK was to guide the government's plans and policies.

Subsequently, the bill "278" passed on July 24, 1963, in the new era of planned economy subsequent to the first five-year development plan of the country, set the official record for the council's presence and duties. Cahit Arf, who was appointed by Gursel as the founding director and whose leading foundation work was assisted by a group of scientists including Erdal İnönü, was subsequently named as the first chairman of the Council on December 26, 1963. The council's first ten members were professors Erdal İnönü, Ratip Berker, Hikmet Binark, Mecit Çağatay, Reşat Garan, Feza Gürsey, Orhan Işık, Mustafa İnan, Atıf Şengün and İhsan Topaloğlu. They nominated Nimet Özdaş as the first secretary general of TÜBİTAK effective March 1, 1964.

At that time of its establishment, TÜBİTAK's primary tasks at the time were supporting basic and applied academic research and encouraging careers in science by providing incentives to young researchers, in particular to those working in natural sciences. To carry out these tasks, four research grant committees were set up to fund projects in the areas of basic sciences, engineering, medicine, agriculture and animal husbandry. The number now stands at ten and also includes one assigned to social sciences and humanities, all functioning under the Research Support Programmes Department. A separate “Scientist Training Group”, also set up at the time to orient promising students towards scientific careers and help their advancement thereafter, has now evolved into the present Science Fellowships and Grant Programmes Division.

TÜBİTAK was involved in a major scandal in 2009, when then vice-president Ömer Ziya Cebeci censored the March 2009 issue of the popular science magazine Bilim ve Teknik (Science and Technology) on religious grounds, and sacked its editor. This caused protests across the country, in particular among university students, —as well as widespread condemnation across the political spectrum, including from both the opposition as well as the AKP government. Court proceedings regarding the incident concluded in 2013 that the sacking of the journal's editor by Ömer Ziya Cebeci and his superior Nüket Yetiş was illegal.

Media related to Protests at the Middle Eastern Technical University demanding the resignation of Ömer Ziya Cebeci and Nüket Yetiş. (March 13, 2009) at Wikimedia Commons

Media related to Ömer Ziya Cebeci at Wikimedia Commons

== Activities ==
TÜBİTAK is responsible for the development and coordination of scientific research in line with the national targets and priorities, set by the Turkish Academy of Sciences (TÜBA). More than 2,500 researchers work at the 15 different research institutes and research centers attached to TÜBİTAK, where both contract-based and targeted nationwide research is conducted. TÜBİTAK represents Turkey in international research efforts including memberships in European Science Foundation and the European Union Framework Programmes for Research and Technological Development.

Following research centers and institutes are subordinate to TÜBİTAK:

- Marmara Research Center (MAM)
  - Energy Institute
  - Food Institute
  - Chemical Technology Institute
  - Environment and Cleaner Production Institute
  - Materials Institute
  - Earth and Marine Sciences Institute
  - Genetic Engineering and Biotechnology Institute
- Center of Research for Advanced Technologies of Informatics and Information Security (BILGEM)
  - Advanced Technologies Research Institute
  - National Research Institute of Electronics and Cryptology
  - Information Technologies Institute
  - Research Institute of Fundamental Sciences
  - Research Institute for Software Development
  - Cyber Security Institute
- Defense Industries Research and Development Institute (SAGE)
- Space Technologies Research Institute (UZAY)
- National Metrology Institute (UME)
- Turkish Institute of Management Sciences (TUSSIDE)
- Technology Free Zone and Technopark
- National Academic Network and Information Center (ULAKBİM)
- Bursa Test and Analysis Laboratory (BUTAL)
- National Observatory (TUG)
- Rail Transport Technologies Institute (RUTE)

== Scientific publishing ==
TÜBİTAK publishes 11 English-language, peer-reviewed and diamond open access academic journals in different scientific fields. TÜBİTAK's first scientific journal was established in December 1976 under the title Doğa Bilim Dergisi. TÜBİTAK's portfolio includes:

- Turkish Journal of Agriculture and Forestry
- Turkish Journal of Biology
- Turkish Journal of Botany
- Turkish Journal of Chemistry
- Turkish Journal of Earth Sciences
- Turkish Journal of Electrical Engineering and Computer Sciences
- Turkish Journal of Mathematics
- Turkish Journal of Medical Sciences
- Turkish Journal of Physics
- Turkish Journal of Veterinary & Animal Sciences
- Turkish Journal of Zoology

== Products and projects ==
- MILCEP
- RASAT
- BALISTIKA
- AKIS - Smart ID
- HGK - Guidance Kit
- TÜBİTAK-SAGE SARB-83 — Penetration bomb
- TÜBİTAK-SAGE TOGAN — Air-to-surface launched 81 mm mortar munition
- TÜBİTAK-SAGE BOZOK — Laser-guided UAV bomb
- TÜBİTAK-SAGE KUZGUN — Modular joint ammunition
- Landmine Detection by 3D
- Pardus
- Seeker Head
- ETMTS-2 — Hand-held mine detection system
- ETMTS-3 (ALPER) — Hand-held mine detection system
- OZAN — Foldable metal mine detector
- SOM (missile)
- HGK (bomb)
- KGK — Smart wing adapter kit
- TOROS artillery rocket system
- Thermal Battery
- NEB Bunker Buster
- GÖKTUĞ
- NBC-KET Project — 160.000 pieces of CBRN protective clothing sets for the Turkish Armed Forces

== See also ==
- Turkish National Research Institute of Electronics and Cryptology (UEKAE), affiliated with TÜBİTAK
- Turkish Academy of Sciences (TÜBA)
- Bilim ve Teknik
