= Ankara Science High School =

High school in Ankara, Turkey

Coordinates: 39°52′38″N 32°48′25″E

- Ankara Fen Lisesi
- The school logo omits the letter "A" for Ankara, reflecting its status as the first science high school in Turkey.
- ODTÜ Küme Evleri, Çankaya, Ankara; Turkey

Information
- Type: Public, Boarding
- Established: October 1963, 23; 62 years ago
- Principal: Durmuş Bozkurt
- Campus: Suburban (30 acres)
- Color: Red Yellow Black
- Abbreviations: AFL and Fen Lisesi
- Website: ankarafenlisesi.meb.k12.tr

Ankara High School of Science (Turkish: Ankara Fen Lisesi abbreviated as AFL) formerly known simply as Fen Lisesi (English: High School of Science), is a public boarding high school located in Ankara, Turkey. Its campus, located near the Middle East Technical University (METU), was designed by architect Behruz Çinici, who also designed the METU campus. Founded in 1964 with financial support from the Ford Foundation and USAID, it was the first institution of its kind in the country, offering a specialized curriculum with a focus on mathematics and the natural sciences for academically high-achieving students. The school was modeled after the Bronx High School of Science.

The success of its alumni in academia, science, and various professional fields contributed to the nationwide adoption of the science high school model. Similar public and private science high schools have since been established in major cities across Turkey. Notable alumni include physicist Tekin Dereli, mathematician Halil Mete Soner, mathematician Cem Yıldırım, and former Turkcell CEO Süreyya Ciliv.

== History ==
In the context of rapid scientific and technological advancements during the 1950s and the intensifying global competition in these fields, the demand for qualified professionals in science and technology increased significantly. In response, the Organisation for Economic Co-operation and Development (OECD) launched the "Science Project" in 1959, aiming to modernize science education in member countries. This initiative influenced secondary education reforms in Turkey.

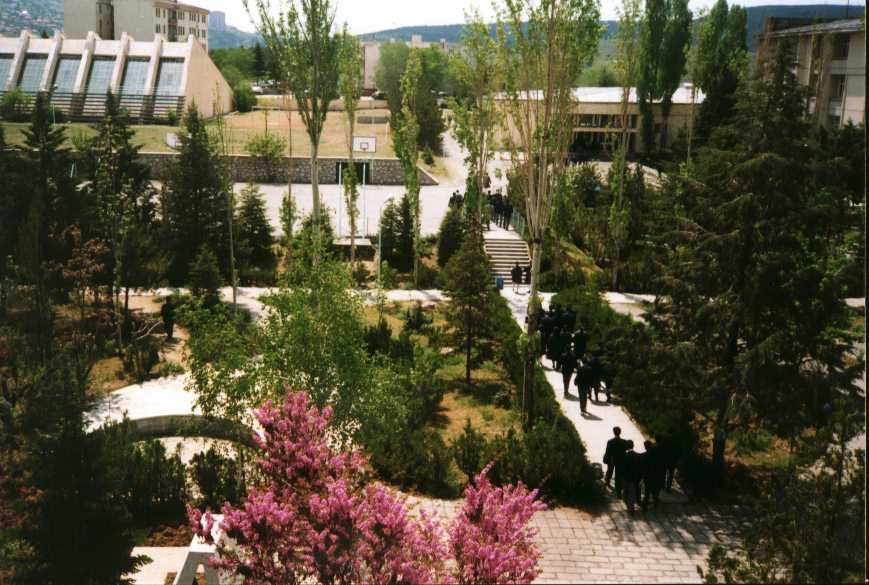
Trees from various species are present throughout the campus grounds.

Following recommendations made at the VII National Education Council, the Turkish Ministry of National Education initiated preparations to establish a specialized high school focused on science education. On April 3, 1962, Ministerial Order No. 675 authorized the creation of an investigative committee titled "Commission for the Establishment of a Science High School". The committee's report formed the basis for subsequent discussions within the ministry, and by early 1963, the proposal was developed into a collaborative "quadruple project" involving the Ministry of National Education, the Ford Foundation, Middle East Technical University (METU), and the United States Agency for International Development (USAID).

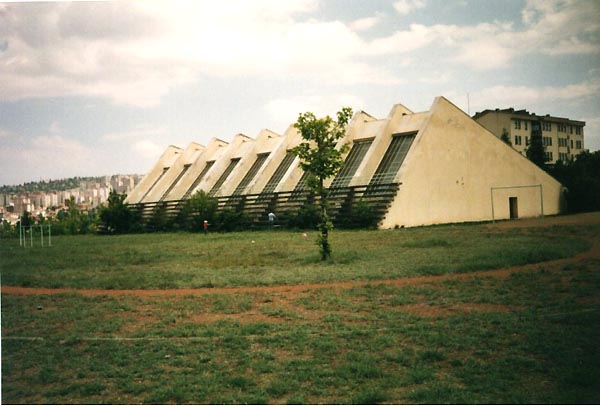
The sports center features brutalist architecture, in line with the overall campus design.

The project officially commenced on October 23, 1963. According to the plan, the program would be jointly implemented by Ankara-based universities, including METU and Ankara University, Istanbul University's Faculty of Science and Florida State University in the United States. The architectural design of the school was commissioned to Turkish architect Behruz Çinici. The campus was constructed on a remote hilltop within the METU Forest in Ankara. Prominent Turkish scientists, including Cahit Arf and Erdal İnönü, played advisory roles in the school's founding. American mathematician Eugene P. Northrop also served as an advisor to the planning commission.

The school, officially named Fen Lisesi (English: High School of Science), opened under the General Directorate of Secondary Education during the 1963–1964 academic year. It retained its unique status as the only science high school in Turkey until 1982. As more science high schools were established across the country in subsequent years, the original institution was renamed Ankara Fen Lisesi (English: Ankara High School of Science) to distinguish it from its successors.

The school's founding coincided with the introduction of the New Math movement in the United States. Educational materials developed by the School Mathematics Study Group and similar reform initiatives in physics, chemistry, and biology were translated into Turkish and integrated into the curriculum. Throughout its history, the school has attracted academic visitors. Notably, James D. Watson, recipient of the 1962 Nobel Prize in Physiology or Medicine, visited the campus and delivered a lecture during the 1960s.

== Notable alumni ==
- Ekmel Özbay, professor at Bilkent University, and the director of the Nanotechnology Research Center (NANOTAM )
- Tekin Dereli, Turkish theoretical physicist, formerly at Middle East Technical University and Koç University
- Halil Mete Soner, Turkish-American mathematician, Normal John Sollenberger Professor at Princeton University
- Abdullah Atalar, professor emeritus of Electrical Engineering and a former rector of Bilkent University
- Cem Yıldırım, Turkish mathematician who specializes in number theory at Bogazici University
- İsmail Özdağlar, Turkish politician and former government minister
- Duygu Kuzum, Turkish-American electrical engineer, professor at the University of California, San Diego
- Lale Akarun, Turkish electrical engineer and computer scientist and former vice-rector of Boğaziçi University
- Mustafa Akaydın, former Mayor of Antalya and rector of Akdeniz University
- Süreyya Ciliv, former CEO of Turkcell
- Cem Ersoy, professor at the department of computer engineering at Boğaziçi University
- Birsen Yazıcı, Turkish-American electrical engineer, professor at the Rensselaer Polytechnic Institute
- Alper Demir, professor of Electrical Engineering at Koç University
- Hilmi Volkan Demir, Turkish scientist and professor at Bilkent University
- Ozgur B. Akan, professor at the Department of Engineering, University of Cambridge
- Bülent Sivri, president of the Hacettepe University School of Medicine
- Tayfun Gönül, writer, MD, and Turkey's first conscientious objector
- Emin Alper, Turkish filmmaker and historian
- Derya Köroğlu, musician and vocal of Yeni Türkü
- Ahmet Kanneci, Turkish gitar virtuoso
- Hakan Kara, former chief economist of the Central Bank of the Republic of Turkey
- Selim Atakan, musician and member of Yeni Türkü

== See also ==
- Science High School (disambiguation)
- Bronx High School of Science
- Middle East Technical University
