= Halil Mete Soner =

Turkish American mathematician

Halil Mete Soner is a Turkish American mathematician born in Ankara and is the Norman John Sollenberger Professor at Princeton University. Soner's research interests are nonlinear partial differential equations; asymptotic analysis of Ginzburg-Landau type systems, viscosity solutions, and mathematical finance. Currently he is working on mean field games and control and related nonlinear partial differential equations on Wasserstein spaces.

== Education ==
After graduating from the Ankara Science High School, he started his university education at the Middle East Technical University in Ankara, later transferred to Boğaziçi University, Istanbul. He received a B.Sc. in mathematics and another in electrical engineering simultaneously, both in first-rank. Soner then attended Brown University in Providence, Rhode Island, U.S. on a research fellowship, where he obtained his M.Sc. and Ph.D. in applied mathematics.

== Career ==
Soner was research associate at the Institute for Mathematics and Applied Sciences in Minneapolis, MN and, assistant professor and then professor in the Department of Mathematical Sciences at the Carnegie Mellon University in Pittsburgh, PA. He was Research Associate at the Feza Gursey Institute for Basic Sciences in Istanbul and visiting professor of Mathematics at the Boğaziçi University for a year, Istanbul and the University of Paris, Paris, France. For two years, Soner was “Paul M. Whythes `55” Professor of Finance and Engineering in the Department of Operations Research and Financial Engineering at Princeton University. Then, he moved to Koç University where he served as the Dean of the College of Administrative Sciences and Economics until September 2007. From 2007 until 2009 he was the Isik Inselbag Professor of Finance in Sabancı University. From 2009 to 2019 he was a Professor of Financial Mathematics at ETH Zürich. Currently he is the chair of the department of Operations Research and Financial Engineering at Princeton.

Soner co-authored a book, with Wendell Fleming, on viscosity solutions and stochastic control; Controlled Markov Processes and Viscosity Solutions (Springer-Verlag), (second edition 2006). He authored or co-authored papers on nonlinear partial differential equations, viscosity solutions, stochastic optimal control, mathematical finance, martingale optimal transport and mean field games and control.

== Awards ==
He received the TÜBITAK-TWAS Science award in 2002, was the recipient of an ERC Advanced Investigators Grant in 2009 and the Alexander von Humboldt Foundation Research Award in 2014 and was elected as a SIAM Fellow in 2015.

== Personal life ==
He lives in Princeton with his wife Serpil and they have a son, Mehmet Ali.
