= Alper Demir =

Alper Demir is a Professor of Electrical Engineering at Koç University in Istanbul, Turkey. He was named a Fellow of the Institute of Electrical and Electronics Engineers (IEEE) in 2012 for his contributions to stochastic modeling and analysis of phase noise.

== Education and career ==
After graduating from Ankara Science High School in 1987, Demir studied electrical engineering at Bilkent University, where he got his B.S. in 1991, and then immigrated to the United States where he received his M.S. and Ph.D. degrees from the University of California, Berkeley in 1994 and 1997, respectively.

Prior to getting to a full career at Koç University, Demir worked on some summer jobs in Motorola (1995) and Cadence Design Systems (1996). He then joined Bell Labs, serving there from 1997 to 2000 and until 2002 worked at CeLight. While there, he was responsible for creation of as many as six inventions and was co-author of two books about nonlinear noise analysis and analog design methodologies. Between summer of 2002 and August 2005, he worked at the Research Laboratory of Electronics at MIT, and from 2009 to 2010, served as visiting professor at the University of California, Berkeley. Following it, Demir moved to Koç University, where, after serving as assistant professor at their Department of Electrical and Electronics Engineering from 2002 to 2007, he was promoted to associate the following year.

From February to June 2017, Demir was a visiting scientist at Massachusetts Institute of Technology and between 2011 and 2017, served as an associate editor of the IEEE Transactions on Computer-Aided Design of Integrated Circuits and Systems. Demir's research interests are in the fields of computational and quantitative biology, stochastic and nonlinear dynamical systems in electronics and biology, and the study of noises in electronic, optical, communication and biological systems.
