= Koç University Suna Kıraç Library =

Library in Istanbul, Turkey

- Location: Istanbul, Turkey, Turkey
- Established: 1993

Collection
- Size: 270,000

Other information
- Employees: 30
- Website: library.ku.edu.tr

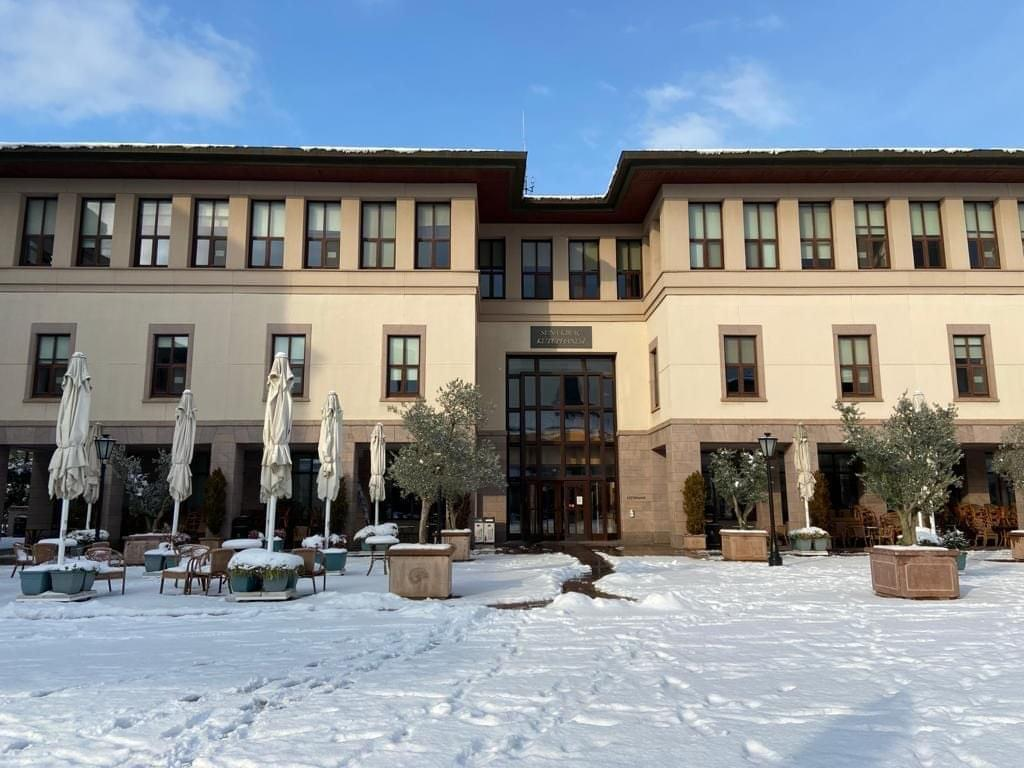
View from the campus to the library

Koç University Suna Kıraç Library, a library in Istanbul, Turkey which began as part of Koç University in 1993.

Located on the university's campus in Rumelifeneri, the library is the management and coordination center of other libraries and library services within the institution. The library, which serves in a structure of 8,300 square meters consisting of four floors, has a seating capacity of 915 people. It derives its name from business person Suna Kıraç.

== History ==
The Library opened on 12 October 1993 as a part of Koç University. The initial collection did consist of 1590 volumes and it was located on the İstinye Campus, the first campus of the university, built on the site of a former match factory. The library moved to the new campus built in Rumelifeneri in 2000.

In 1995-2003, former Library of Congress librarian Jane Ann Lindley served as the director of the Suna Kıraç Library. After the departure of Ms. Lindley in 1993, Didar Bayır was appointed as Director.

In 1999, the Health Sciences Library at the Nursing School in Nişantaşı (currently moved to the Koç University Health Sciences Campus in the Topkapı district) was opened. The second branch library called "the Research Center for Anatolian Civilizations" opened at in the "Merkez Han" in Beyoğlu district of Istanbul in 2005 for serving researchers on Turkish history, art history and archeology. The Vehbi Koç and Ankara Research Center Library & Archive opened in Keçiören district of Ankara joined the Suna Kıraç library as another branch library focusing on the photos, publications, documents, maps, postcards and documentary films on Ankara. Suna & İnan Kıraç Mediterranean Civilizations Research Center (AKMED) Library was opened in Antalya in 2016 and it also became a part of the collections of the Suna Kıraç Library.

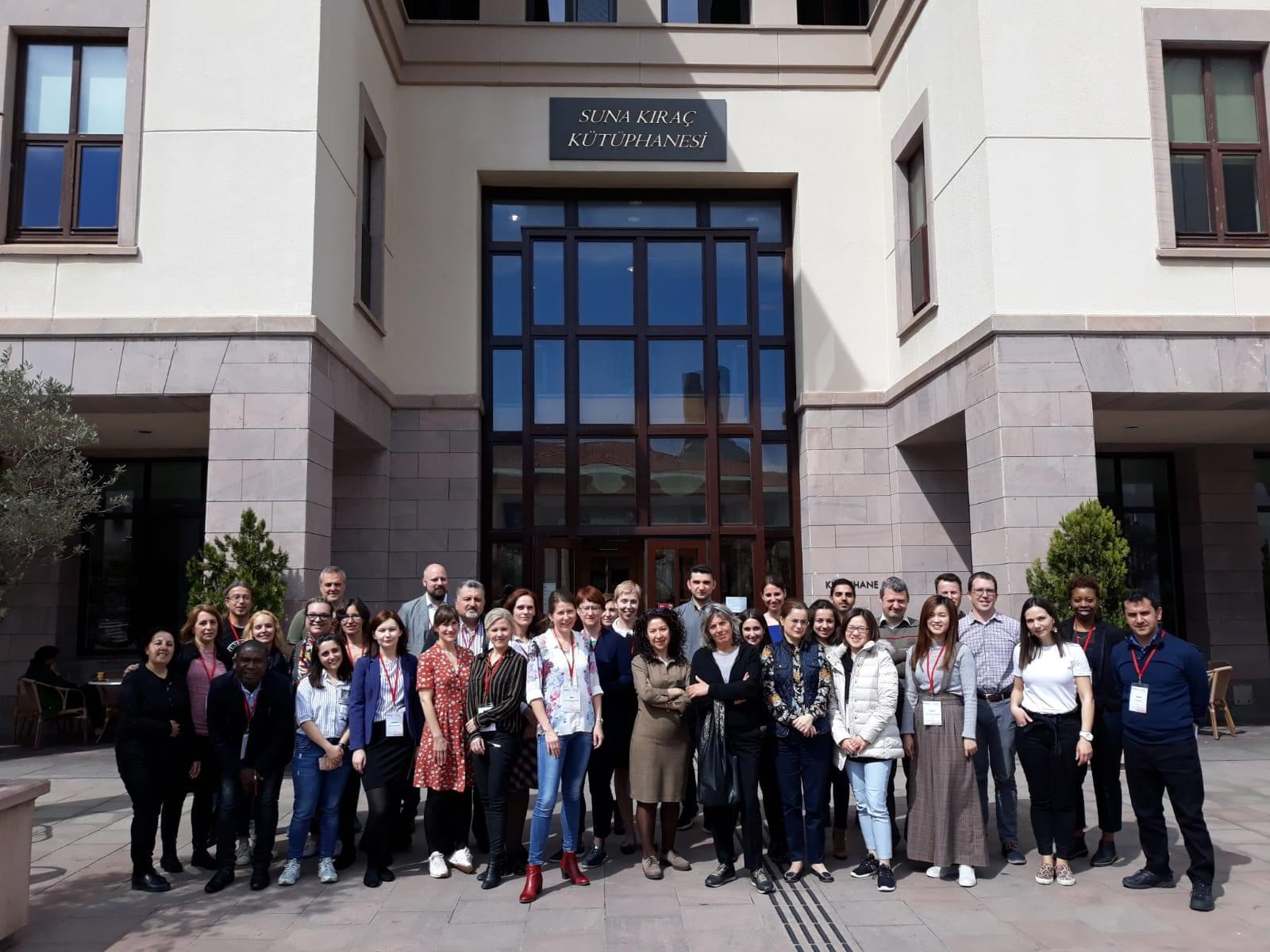
The Second International Library Staff Week was organized by Suna Kıraç Library in 2019

The administration of the Netherlands Research Institute (NIT) Library, a research center dedicated to the study of Turkey and its surrounding regions through the ages, and located at Merkez Han transferred to Koç University Suna Kıraç Library in 2016. Following the extensive restoration of the ANAMED Library in 2017, the collections of the American Research Institute in Turkey (ARIT) and the Turkish Institute of Archaeology (TEBE) containing 12,500 monographs covering Byzantine, Ottoman Empire and modern Turkey, have been added to the ANAMED Library.

Suna Kıraç Library hosted the 2000 meeting of the Anatolian University Libraries Consortium Association (ANKOS).

In 2016, the library undertook the project of BiblioPera: Beyoğlu Research Centers Network, established to encourage research on Turkey in the fields of history, archeology and social science and to give Beyoğlu a new research identity, it provides access to the databases of 13 international research centers in Beyoğlu from a single platform.

International events

Suna Kıraç Library is a member of the International Federation of Library Associations and Institutions (FLA), the International Association of Scientific and Technological University Libraries (IATUL), the American Library Association (ALA), and the European Research Libraries Association (LIBER).

The library hosted annual meetings of several local and foreign librarianship organizations. 2018 International Library Staff Week events in Istanbul hosting eight librarians from the American Beirut University Libraries in 2019, Geek and Turkish Library Staff Week and the 2nd International Library Staff Week celebrations are among the international events hosted by the Suna Kıraç Library.

Koç University Suna Kıraç Library in numbers

- Number of rare books: 7814
- Number of subscribed e-journals: 56554
- Number of subscribed databases: 119
- Number of electronic books: 235,833
- Number of branch libraries: 4
- Total employee number in libraries: 30

Technical Infrastructure

Sierra automation system of Innovative company is used for librarianship processes. It provides access to many electronic resources of various types on and off-campus.

== Collections ==
=== Printed collection ===
The works brought to the Suna Kıraç Library through donations and purchases mainly consist of English and Turkish sources. In addition to works in these two languages, there are also publications in German, French, Russian, Italian, Spanish and Chinese. As of 2022, the number of printed books is over 270 thousand and the total number of sources is more than 370 thousand.

=== Digital collection ===
The digital collections of the Library aim to provide access to materials illustrating Koç University research, science and history. All materials are protected by copyright and are for non-commercial, educational use only. Koç University collections contain approximately 300,000 digital images, including prints, photographs, slides, maps, newspapers, posters, postcards, manuscripts, streaming video and more. There are digital exhibitions of different content on the Koç University Digital Collections website.

Koç University Suna Kıraç Library Digital Collections include the following special collections:

- VEKAM Institutional Repository Collection
- Ankara State Conservatory Collection (Musiki Muallim Mektebi)
- Koç University Collection of Institutional Memory – KU-CIM
- Vehbi Koç Press Clippings Collection
- Ankara Documents Collection
- Vehbi Koç Collection
- The Soundscape of Istanbul Collection
- Ulla Johansen Anatolian Ethnology Collection
- Sounds of The Rahmi M. Koç Museum – Echoes of Industrial Legacy
- Ankara Immovable Cultural Property Collection
- Ankara Orchard House Collection
- Civil Architectural Memory Ankara 1930-1980 Structure Inventory
- Collection of İclal Danişmend Correspondence & İsmail Hami Danişmend Family
- VEKAM LoCloud Collection
- GABAM Byzantine Monuments Photographs Archive
- AKMED Stereoscopic Glass Slide Collection
- Ankara Map and Plan Archive
- Mehmet Nihat Nigizberk Collection of Architectural Photographs and Drawings
- KU Theses & Dissertations Collection
- Ankara Photograph, Postcard and Engraving Collection
- Koç University Institutional Repository (KU-IR)
- Hatice Gonnet-Bağana Hittite Collection
- Koç University Manuscripts Collection
- Josephine Powell Slides Collection
- Cahide Tamer Historic Buildings Restoration Projects Collection
- Hüseyin Hilmi Pasha Documents Collection
- GABAM Byzantine Musical Instruments Collection
- Turkish Cartoon Prints Collection
- Hadi Tamer Documents Collection
- ARHA Trips Collection
- Admiral Bristol School of Nursing Collection, 1920-1999
- MAVA Exhibitions Collection
- Military History Collection

=== Rare book collection ===
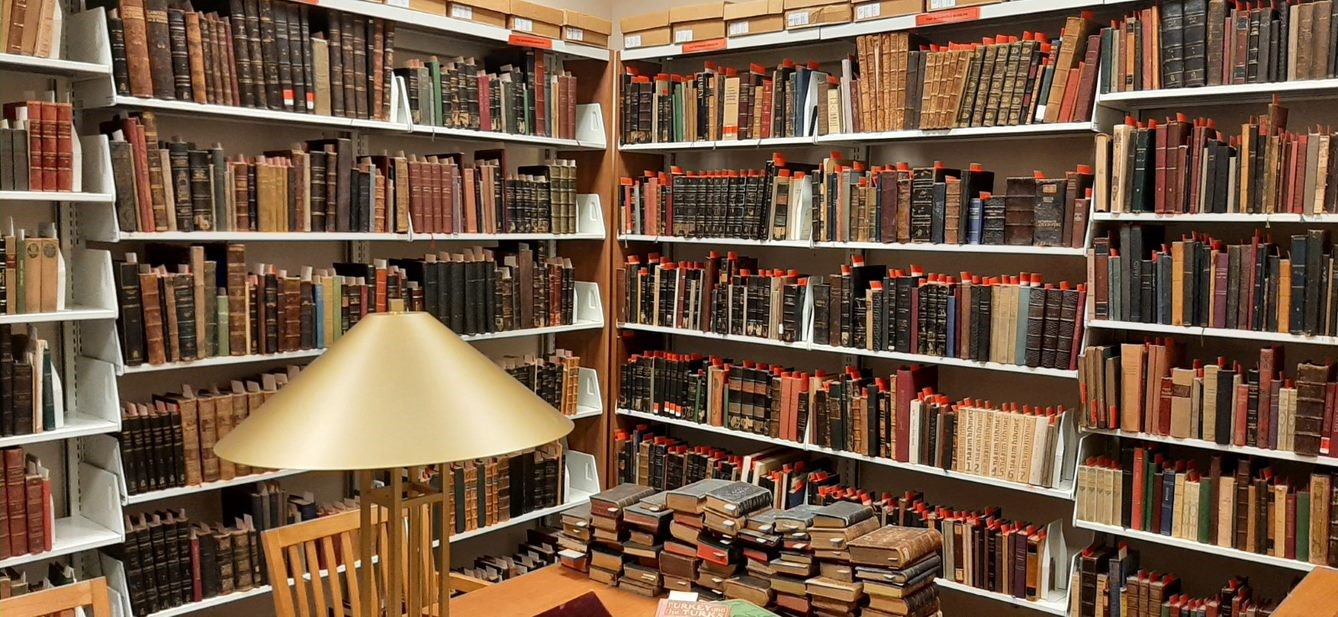
Rare materials are kept in the Nesteren and Fuat Bayramoğlu Room

The rare book collection of the Suna Kıraç Library includes approximately 8,000 rare works on European and Ottoman history, literature and religion. The majority of the works in question are Nesteren and Fuat Bayramoğlu and St. Andrews donations. Rare works belonging to Şinasi Tekin purchased by the library are also included in this collection.

In addition to books in modern Turkish, the rare works collection includes books in those languages Ottoman Turkish, French, English, Latin, Persian and Arabic. The subjects of the books in the collection are 19th and 20th-century Turkish literature, Istanbul travelogues, foreign affairs of the Roman, Byzantine and Ottoman Empires, the Turkish revolution and Mustafa Kemal Atatürk.

Books defined as "Rare Works" are found the Nesteren and Fuat Bayramoğlu Collection Room on the first floor of the library and they can not be loaned out.

=== Manuscript collection ===
Koç University Manuscripts Collection provides resources for studies in the fields of Turkish poetry, law, geography, astronomy, medicine, philosophy, logic, music, mathematics, chemistry, and especially language and cultural history. Anatolian/Ottoman Sufism (Bayrami, Melami and Mevlevi paths), Turkish Literature, Islamic morals and ethics, works on Islamic law, Qur'an studies, fatwas, hadith records have an important place in the collection.

The manuscripts in the collection mainly consist of Turkish and Arabic works. In addition to these two languages, there are manuscripts written in different languages such as Persian, Karaman, Crimean Tatar, Crimean Turkish and bilingual (Persian-Arabic or Arabic-Turkish). Works related to Turkish language and literature in Anatolia form a characteristic group of works in the collection.

The oldest copy among the dated manuscripts is the work dated 1100 named "Nazmü'l-Hilāfiyyāt [Manzumetü'n-Nesefiyye]". Ismail Haqqi Bursevi's 1969 work titled "Şerhü'l-Usūli'l-Aşere" is the latest dated copy.

The people who donated the collection include diplomat and poet Fuat Bayramoğlu, Turcologist and linguist Şinasi Tekin, photographer, traveler and Turkish nomadic culture and textile expert Josephine Powell, State Archives General Directorate consultant Midhat Sertoğlu, Konya bureaucrat and politician Salim Erel.

Detailed descriptions of 425 manuscripts out of 686 that were included in the Suna Kıraç Library Rare Works Collection by donation and purchase are included in Koç University Suna Kıraç Library Manuscripts Catalog 1, published in 2018. The catalog contains manuscripts from the personal libraries of Fuat Bayramoğlu, Midhat Sert, Josephine Powell and Şinasi Tekin, which were transferred to the Suna Kıraç Library between 1995 and 2005.

The second volume of the Koç University Suna Kıraç Library Manuscripts Catalogue is the catalog of the works donated by Salim Erel. Erel manuscripts are among the works taught in madrasahs. In the catalog section, paleography information of each of the works, visuals showing the beginning and end of the texts of the works, evaluations about the content of the work and notes about the reader's comments, and bibliographic information are presented.

=== Branch libraries ===
AKMED Library: provides service in Kaleiçi, Antalya. The collection has been created in line with the wishes of the researchers, especially on the subject of geography, Ancient history and the archeology of Antalya.

ANAMED Library: It provides service in the building called Merkez Han, located on İstiklal Street in the Beyoğlu district of Istanbul. Library use is limited to individual researchers, ANAMED scholars, students and faculty members who want to research and preserve Turkey's cultural heritage. Students, alumni, academic and administrative staff of the institution, employees, who study at Koç University; Faculty members and families of employees also use it.

Health Sciences Library: It is the branch of Koç University Libraries located in Topkapı, Koç University Health Sciences Campus. Its collection is geared towards nursing and health sciences. The services are mainly designed for the faculty and students of the Health Sciences Campus.

VEKAM Library: VEKAM Library and Archive is located in Keçiören, Ankara and functions as the city memory of Ankara. It was established in 1994 and was attached to Koç University Suna Kıraç Library in 2014. Publications are containing historical and cultural studies about Ankara.

=== Cultural activities ===
Podcast series

Within the scope of Cultural Heritage studies, the “ANAMED Library Podcast: Burada Konuşmak Serbest” podcast series, in which the library and current developments and current services in the library and archival area are discussed, has started in June 2020. The podcast series "Koç Üniversitesi Suna Kıraç Kütüphanesi İstanbul'u Dinliyorum...", in which different subjects on Istanbul history, culture was discussed, has started in April 2021 with the guests of Istanbul experts. Lastly, the "Suna Kıraç Libraries Podcast" podcast series has started in which podcasts on Suna Kıraç Library theme studies were discussed has started in November 2021.

International Archive Day Conference series

Suna Kıraç Library hosts events as part of the International Archives Day Conference series. The conferences focus on introducing different archives in various institutions, different digital humanities projects, digital preservation and new technologies.
