= Hatice Gonnet-Bağana =

Turkish archaeologist specialising in the Hittites

- Born: August 31, 1932; Istanbul, Turkey
- Died: December 6, 2025 (aged 93); Serviers-et-Labaume, France

Academic background
- Education: University of Paris I
- Thesis: La titulature royale hittite au IIe millénaire av. J.-C. (1973)

Academic work
- Discipline: Hittitology
- Institutions: French National Centre for Scientific Research

Hatice Gonnet-Bağana (31 August 1932 – 6 December 2025) was a Turkish archaeologist specialising in the Hittites. She was an emerita researcher at the French National Centre for Scientific Research.

== Life ==
Hatice Bağana was born in Istanbul in 1932. Her great-grandfather, Mehmed Said Bey (1865-1928), was an interpreter at the Ottoman court. Her father, Mehmet Ali Bağana, was one of the first administrators of the Republic of Turkey, instrumental in Turkish land reform. When he was posted to Paris to work at the OECD, she studied archaeology and history of art at École pratique des hautes études (1967) and subsequently the École du Louvre (1969). In 1969, she joined the French National Centre for Scientific Research (CNRS). She obtained her doctorate under the guidance of Emmanuel Laroche in 1973 at the University of Paris I. After Laroche's retirement, she became the head of the Hittitology department at the École pratique des hautes études. She retired in 1997 as an honorary researcher of the CNRS, and was elected as a member of the Deutsche Orient-Gesellschaft in Berlin. Between 1997 and 2011, she taught at the École du Louvre.

In 1964, Hatice Bağana married Antoine Gonnet, a French artist. He died in 2004.

In 2014, Gonnet-Bağana donated her archive of correspondence, academic research, lecture notes and extensive documentation of Hittitology to Koç University in Turkey. Her family archives are held at SALT.

Gonnet-Bağana died in 2025.

== Research ==
In 1979, Hatice Gonnet-Bağana was in the village of Beyköy, searching for traces of Hittite presence. In 1884, a stone inscription (since lost) of Hittite writing had been documented by W. M. Ramsay, while C. H. Emilie Haspels found second millennium BCE sherds in the area. Gonnet-Bağana's team, hoping to see Hittite artefacts reused locally, was unable to find any, but did establish Chalcolithic remains and determined a Phrygian presence in the area, later reused by Romans. Ramsay's inscription was deciphered in 2017 as writing in the Luwian language (on the orders of a local monarch Kupanta-Kurunta), which triggered further interest in Beyköy. Georges Perrot, a French archaeologist, had claimed that the stone was used in the construction of a local mosque, but this was dismissed by Gonnet-Bağana. Her investigations in the area continued the following year, when she discovered and annotated several rock-cut altars.

== Selected works ==
- A. Archi & H. Gonnet, eds. (2016.) Études anatoliennes de E. Laroche. Subartu 37. Brepols. ISBN 9782503566726
- (1995) 'Remarques sur le himma et le hiéroglyphe L. 306.' in ed. Carruba, O., Giorgieri, M., & Mora, C. Atti del II Congresso Intemazionale di Hittitologia. Studia Mediterranea 9. pp. 149–154.
- (1994) 'THE CEMETERY AND ROCK-CUT TOMBS AT BEYKÖY IN PHRYGIA.' Anatolian Iron Ages 3: The Proceedings of the Third Anatolian Iron Ages Colloquium Held at Van, 6–12 August 1990, ed. A. Çilingiroğlu and D.H. French, vol. 16, British Institute at Ankara. pp. 75–90..
- (1988) 'Dieux fugueurs, dieux captés chez les Hittites.' Revue de l'histoire des religions. 205, n°4. pp. 385–398.
- (1968) 'Les montagnes d’Asie Mineure d’après les textes hittites.' Revue Hittite et Asianique. 26-83. pp. 93–171.
- (1967). 'Le disque solaire Hittite d'après les documents archéologique'. Anadolu. 11. pp. 167–196. doi:10.1501/Andl_0000000100
- "Frigya'da bilinmeyen Sırakaya yapıtları". Türk Tarih Kongresi X. 1986.
- "Frikya'da Geç Bronz Çağma tarihlenebilecek kaya eserleri üzerine gözlemler". Türk Tarih Kongresi IX. 1985.
