= Tayfun Gönül =

- Born: 1958; İzmit
- Died: 30th of July 2012, Aged 54; Istanbul
- Occupations: Journalist, Activist
- Known for: Conscientious objection, activism pertaining to anarchism

Tayfun Gönül (1958, İzmit - 30 July 2012, Istanbul) was a Turkish anarchist, writer, doctor and the first conscientious objector in Turkey.

== Biography ==
Gönül's childhood years were spent in Izmir and Istanbul. After graduating from Ankara Science High School, he studied medicine at Hacettepe University Faculty of Medicine and graduated as a qualified doctor. His father was also a doctor like himself. Since his high school years, he wrote a plethora of articles for Halkın Sesi (Aydınlık). In the 1980s, he started writing for the magazines Sokak and Yeni Olgu, and in 1986 he began writing for Kara, the first anarchist magazine in Turkey. Moving from Istanbul to Izmir, Gönül founded the Izmir War Resisters Association.

In 1989, he declared his conscientious objection to the compulsory military service that existed in the Turkish state at the time, and took the Turkish state to court over this matter. During these years, Tuğrul Eryılmaz, with whom Gönül had worked at Sokak magazine, started the campaign "No to compulsory military service". Following the launch of the campaign, Gönül, together with Eryılmaz and Metin Münir, the editor-in-chief of Güneş newspaper, were put on trial on charges of "alienating the public from military service". In 1993, he worked extensively to unite all anarchist circles and publications under the Apolitika project. Finally, in 1999, he started publishing the weekly newspaper Efendisizler. Meanwhile, Gönül returned to Antalya and his illness began to take its toll.

On 15 February 2012, Gönül suffered a heart infarction. He survived, and was later discharged after two months in hospital. In 2012, he participated in the World Conscientious Objectors Day which is held every year on 15 May, and made a short speech. However, later that year, on Monday the 30th of July 2012 at around 23.30, Gönül suffered another heart attack while at home and later died in hospital. His body was taken from Zincirlikuyu cemetery morgue and buried in Kilyos cemetery by his friends on 02 of August 2012.

== Publications ==
- Düzenden Kaosa Zuhur (Gediz Akdeniz ile Söyleşi), 2008
- Anarşizm Nedir?, 2010 (Broşür dizisi)
- Akiba, 2010
