= Ziya Öniş =

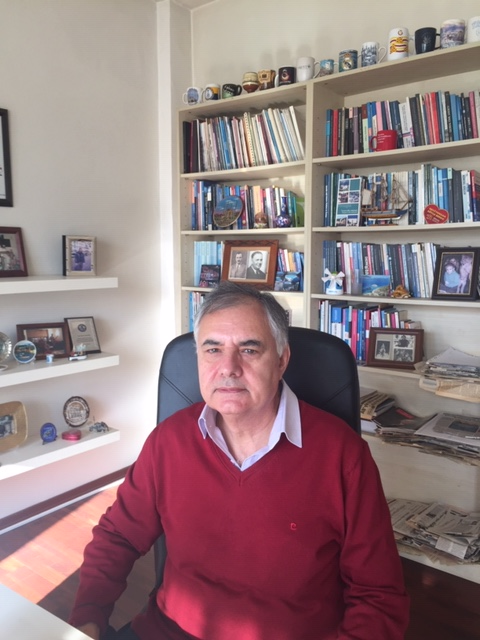
- Ziya Öniş in his office at Koç University
- Born: 12 May 1957 (age 69); Istanbul, Turkey
- Spouse: Dırahşan Öniş
- Children: Güneş Öniş Çapa; Gökhan Baki Öniş

Academic background
- Education: London School of Economics (BSc, MSc); University of Manchester (PhD)

Academic work
- Discipline: International political economy, comparative politics, Turkish politics and foreign policy
- Institutions: Koç University, Istanbul, Turkey
- Awards: Academia Europaea membership (2026); Turkish Economics Association Academic Service Award (2025); International Relations Council of Türkiye Senior Scholar Award (2024); Koç University Outstanding Teaching Award (2024); Kadir Has Outstanding Academic Achievement Award (2023); Elizabeth Meehan Prize (2020; jointly with Mustafa Kutlay); TÜBİTAK Science Award in Social Sciences (2012); Koç University Outstanding Faculty Award (2012)

Ziya Öniş (born 12 May 1957 in Istanbul) is a Turkish political economist and professor of international relations at Koç University in Istanbul, Turkey. He previously served as director of the Graduate School of Social Sciences and Humanities at Koç University.

Öniş received his BSc (1978) and MSc (1979) degrees in economics from the London School of Economics. He obtained his PhD in development economics from the University of Manchester in 1984. His research lies at the intersection of political science and economics, with a focus on international political economy, comparative political economy, development, Turkish politics and foreign policy, and the changing global order. His research has included collaborations with Fikret Şenses, Fuat Keyman, Şuhnaz Yılmaz, Selim Erdem Aytaç, James Riedel and Mustafa Kutlay.

== Life ==
Öniş is a grandson of Yusuf Ziya Öniş, the first president of the Turkish Football Federation and a former president of Galatasaray S.K.. He received much of his higher education in the United Kingdom.

== Career ==
During his doctoral studies at the University of Manchester, Öniş worked under the supervision of Colin Kirkpatrick and Frederick Nixson. He joined the economics department at Boğaziçi University in 1984, became an associate professor in 1988 and a full professor in 1995. He was also a visiting Fulbright fellow at Princeton University in 1989–1990 and worked as a consultant on projects for the OECD and the World Bank.

In September 1999, he joined the Department of International Relations at Koç University. His administrative roles there have included acting dean of the College of Administrative Sciences and Economics (2001–2002), vice-director (2003–2006) and director (2006–2009) of the Graduate School of Social Sciences and Humanities, director of the Center for Research on Globalization and Democratic Governance (GLODEM) (2010–2013), and chair of the Department of International Relations (2014–2018).

Öniş was elected a fellow of the Turkish Academy of Sciences (TÜBA) in 2012 and an honorary member in 2024. In 2012, he received the TÜBİTAK Science Award in Social Sciences. He and Mustafa Kutlay shared the 2020 Elizabeth Meehan Prize for an article published in Government and Opposition in 2019. Öniş received the Kadir Has Outstanding Academic Achievement Award in 2023, the International Relations Council of Türkiye Senior Scholar Award and Koç University's Outstanding Teaching Award in 2024, and the Turkish Economics Association Academic Service Award in 2025. In 2026, he was elected a member of Academia Europaea.

== Selected bibliography ==
The following is a selection of Öniş's books and articles.

=== Books ===
- Öniş, Ziya; Riedel, James (1993). Economic Crises and Long-Term Growth in Turkey. Washington, D.C.: World Bank.
- Öniş, Ziya (1998). State and Market: The Political Economy of Turkey in Comparative Perspective. Istanbul: Boğaziçi University Press.
- Öniş, Ziya; Rubin, Barry, eds. (2003). The Turkish Economy in Crisis. London: Frank Cass. ISBN 9780714683973.
- Öniş, Ziya; Keyman, E. Fuat (2007). Turkish Politics in a Changing World: Global Dynamics and Domestic Transformations. Istanbul: Istanbul Bilgi University Press. ISBN 9786053990055.
- Öniş, Ziya; Şenses, Fikret, eds. (2009). Turkey and the Global Economy: Neo-liberal Restructuring and Integration in the Post-Crisis Era. London: Routledge. ISBN 9780415475617.

=== Selected journal articles ===
- Öniş, Ziya. "The Logic of the Developmental State." Comparative Politics 24, no. 1 (1991): 109–126.
- Öniş, Ziya. "The Political Economy of Islamic Resurgence in Turkey: The Rise of the Welfare Party in Perspective." Third World Quarterly 18, no. 4 (1997): 743–766.
- Öniş, Ziya. "Domestic Politics, International Norms and Challenges to the State: Turkey-EU Relations in the Post-Helsinki Era." Turkish Studies 4, no. 1 (2003): 9–34.
- Öniş, Ziya. "Turgut Özal and His Economic Legacy: Turkish Neo-liberalism in Critical Perspective." Middle Eastern Studies 40, no. 4 (2004): 113–134.
- Öniş, Ziya, and Fikret Şenses. "Rethinking the Emerging Post-Washington Consensus." Development and Change 36, no. 2 (2005): 263–290.
- Öniş, Ziya, and Şuhnaz Yılmaz. "Between Europeanization and Euro-Asianism: Foreign Policy Activism in Turkey during the AKP Era." Turkish Studies 10, no. 1 (2009): 7–24.
- Öniş, Ziya; Bakır, Caner (2010). "The Regulatory State and Turkish Banking Reforms in the Age of Post-Washington Consensus". Development and Change. 41 (1): 77–106. doi:10.1111/j.1467-7660.2009.01634.x.
- Öniş, Ziya (2010). "Contesting for Turkey's Political 'Centre': Domestic Politics, Identity Conflicts and the Controversy over EU Membership". Journal of Contemporary European Studies. 18 (3): 361–376. doi:10.1080/14782804.2010.507919.
- Öniş, Ziya. "Multiple Faces of the 'New' Turkish Foreign Policy: Underlying Dynamics and a Critique." Insight Turkey 13, no. 1 (2011): 47–65.
- Öniş, Ziya (2011). "Power, Interests and Coalitions: The Political Economy of Mass Privatisation in Turkey". Third World Quarterly. 32 (4): 707–724. doi:10.1080/01436597.2011.567004.
- Öniş, Ziya. "The Triumph of Conservative Globalism: The Political Economy of the AKP Era." Turkish Studies 13, no. 2 (2012): 135–152.
- Öniş, Ziya, and Mustafa Kutlay. "Global Shifts and the Limits of the EU's Transformative Power in the European Periphery: Comparative Perspectives from Hungary and Turkey." Government and Opposition 54, no. 2 (2019).
- Öniş, Ziya, and Mustafa Kutlay. "Turkish Foreign Policy in a Post-Western Order: Strategic Autonomy or a New Form of Dependence?" International Affairs 97, no. 4 (2021).
- Öniş, Ziya, and Mustafa Kutlay. "Understanding Oscillations in Recent Turkish Foreign Policy: Pathways to Unusual Middle Power Activism." Third World Quarterly 42, no. 12 (2021): 3051–3069.

=== Recent publications ===
- Öniş, Ziya, and Mustafa Kutlay. "Liberal Democracy on the Edge? Anxieties in a Shifting Global (Dis)order." Alternatives 48, no. 1 (2023): 20–37.
- Öniş, Ziya. "Turkey's New Presidential Regime: Fragility, Resilience, Reversibility." Reflektif: Journal of Social Sciences 4, no. 1 (2023): 159–179.
- Öniş, Ziya. "Historic Missed Opportunities and Prospects for Renewal: Turkey-EU Relations in a Post-Western Order." Turkish Studies 24, nos. 3–4 (2023).
- Öniş, Ziya. "The West Versus the Rest: Russian Invasion of Ukraine and the Crisis of Post-Western Order." Transatlantic Policy Quarterly 21, no. 4 (2023): 33–52.
- Kutlay, Mustafa, and Ziya Öniş. "A Critical Juncture: Russia, Ukraine and the Global South." Survival 66, no. 2 (2024): 19–36.
- Kutlay, Mustafa, and Ziya Öniş. "Governance Crises and Resilience of Authoritarian Populism: 2023 Turkish Elections from the Perspective of Hirschman’s ‘Exit, Voice, and Loyalty’." Southeast European and Black Sea Studies 24, no. 2 (2024): 383–403. doi:10.1080/14683857.2024.2315652.
- Öniş, Ziya, and Yalkun Uluyol. "Middle Powers Between the West and the ‘Rest’: Turkey During the Russian War on Ukraine." Uluslararası İlişkiler / International Relations 22, no. 86 (2025): 5–25. doi:10.33458/uidergisi.1667320.
