= Aylin Küntay =

Linguist and psychologist

Aylin C. Küntay is a professor of psychology at Koç University in Istanbul. She specializes in psycholinguistics and multilingualism, and in particular the study of gesture and communicative development.

== Education ==
After completing a BA in psychology at Boğaziçi University in 1989, Küntay travelled to the United States for graduate study at the University of California, Berkeley, where she received an MA (1995) and then a PhD (1997) in developmental psychology, then a Master of International Studies in Information Management and Systems in 1999.

== Career and honours ==
Küntay worked as a postdoctoral researcher at UC Berkeley until 1998, before taking up a position as assistant professor of psychology at Koç University in 1999. She remained there for the rest of her career, receiving a promotion to associate professor in 2005 and to full professor in 2010. From 2012 to 2014 she was visiting professor at Utrecht University, where she occupied the Prince Claus Chair in Equity and Development.

Küntay received an Outstanding Young Scientist Award from the Turkish Academy of Sciences in 2001–2. She served as associate editor of the Journal of Child Language from 2012 to 2016. Between 2008 and 2014 she was a member of the executive committee of the International Association for the Study of Child Language.

Küntay has held a number of senior administrative roles at Koç University, among them director of the Graduate School of Social Sciences and Humanities (2018–2022) and dean of the College of Social Sciences and Humanities (2017–2024). She was elected as a member of the Academia Europaea in 2024.

== Research ==
Küntay's psycholinguistic research has dealt with topics in the study of cognitive development, heritage languages and multilingualism, gestures in language acquisition, and the use of social robots in educational settings.

== Selected publications ==
- Küntay, Aylin C., & Dan Slobin. 1996. Listening to a Turkish mother: Some puzzles for acquisition. In Dan Isaac Slobin, Julie Gerhardt, Amy Kyratzis, Jiansheng Guo (eds.), Social interaction, social context, and language: essays in honor of Susan Ervin-Tripp, 283-304. New York: Psychology Press. doi:10.4324/9781315806525
- Ervin-Tripp, Susan M. & Aylin C. Küntay. 1997. The occasioning and structure of conversational stories. In Talmy Givón (ed.), Conversation: Cognitive, communicative and social perspectives, 133-166. Amsterdam: John Benjamins. ISBN 9781556196430
- Blom, Elma, Aylin C. Küntay, Marielle Messer, Josje Verhagen & Paul Leseman. 2014. The benefits of being bilingual: Working memory in bilingual Turkish–Dutch children. Journal of Experimental Child Psychology 128, 105-119. doi:10.1016/j.jecp.2014.06.007
- Belpaeme, Tony, Paul Vogt, Rianne Van den Berghe, Kirsten Bergmann, Tilbe Göksun, Mirjam De Haas, Junko Kanero, James Kennedy, Aylin C. Küntay, Ora Oudgenoeg-Paz, Fotios Papadopoulos, Thorsten Schodde, Josje Verhagen, Christopher D. Wallbridge, Bram Willemsen, Jan De Wit, Vasfiye Geçkin, Laura Hoffmann, Stefan Kopp, Emiel Krahmer, Ezgi Mamus, Jean-Marc Montanier, Cansu Oranç & Amit Kumar Pandey. 2018. Guidelines for designing social robots as second language tutors. International Journal of Social Robotics 10, 325–341. doi:10.1007/s12369-018-0467-6
- Kanero, Junko, Vasfiye Geçkin, Cansu Oranç, Ezgi Mamus, Aylin C. Küntay & Tilbe Göksun. 2018. Social robots for early language learning: Current evidence and future directions. Child Development Perspectives 12, 146-151. doi:10.1111/cdep.12277
