= Tekin Dereli =

Turkish theoretical physicist (born 1949)

- Born: November 30, 1949 (age 76); Ankara, Turkey
- Education: Ankara Science High School; Middle East Technical University (BS, PhD)
- Scientific career
- Fields: Theoretical physics
- Workplaces: Middle East Technical University; Ankara University; Lancaster University; Koç University

Tekin Dereli (born November 30, 1949) is a Turkish theoretical physicist.

== Life and academic career ==
He studied at Ankara Science High School and the Middle East Technical University.

He was an associate professor and a Professor of Physics at Middle East Technical University (1984–1987, 1993–2001); professor at Faculty of Science at Ankara University (1987–1993), Leverhulme Visiting Professor at Lancaster University (2000–2001) and since 2001, he is a professor at the department of physics at Koç University.

TÜBİTAK honored him with TÜBİTAK Junior Science Price in 1982 and TÜBİTAK Science Prize in 1996. He also was awarded prestigious Turkish prizes for science by Sedat Simavi Trust in 1989 and METU Mustafa Parlar Foundation Science Award in (1993).

He is a member of Turkish Academy of Sciences (TAS) since 1993.

== Research interests ==
His research interests are Yang-Mills gauge theories, supersymmetry, supergravity, quaternion and octonion algebras, spin structures, generalised theories of gravity, cosmological solutions, integrable systems and phase space quantisation.

== Personal life ==
He is married with two children.
