= Metin Sitti =

Professor in the field of robotics

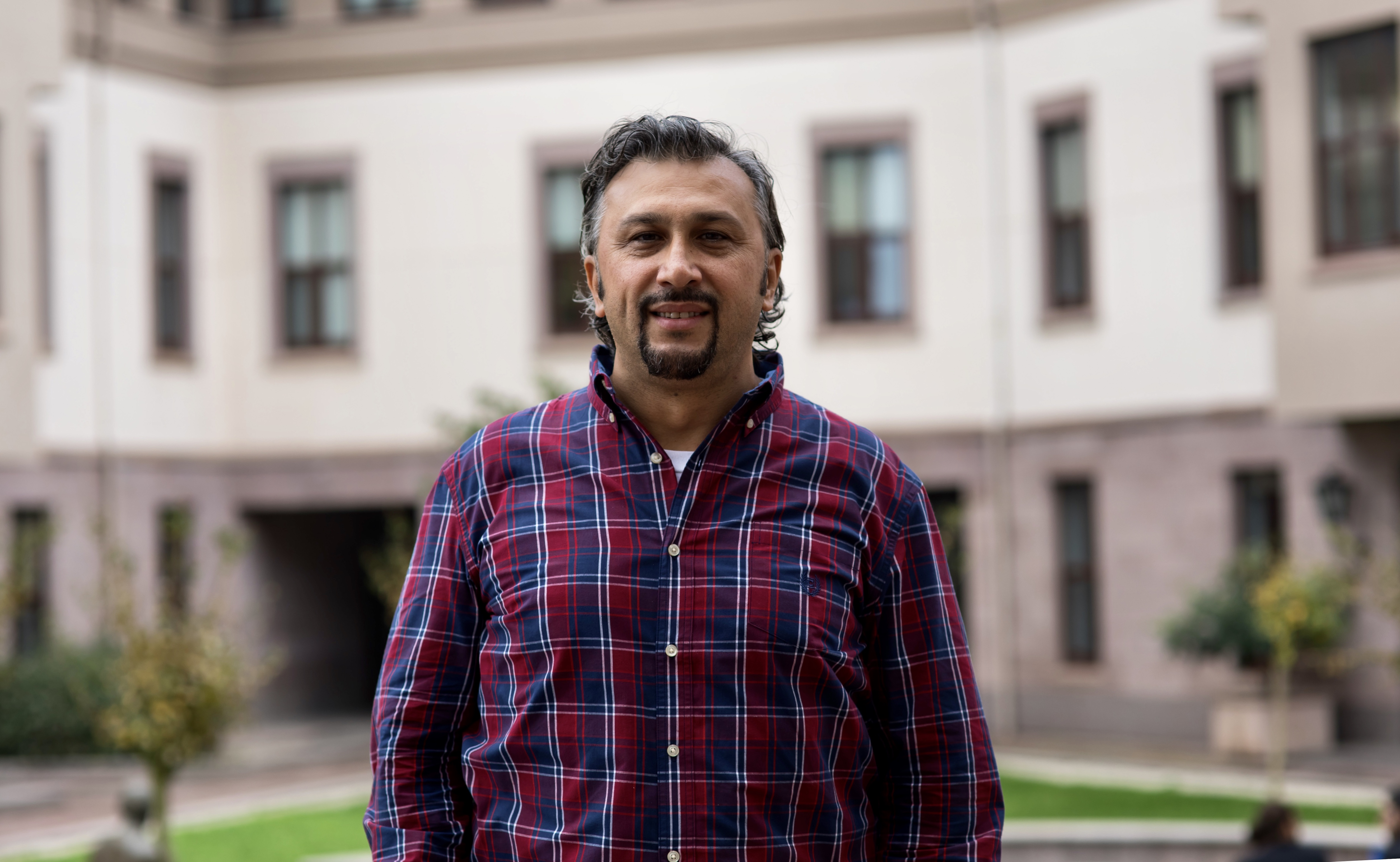
- Metin Sitti; Director, Max Planck Institute for Intelligent Systems in Stuttgart, Germany
- Born: July 29th 1970 (age 55–56); Kırşehir
- Education: Boğaziçi University (BS, MS); University of Tokyo (PhD)
- Known for: Microrobotics; Medical Devices; Bio-inspired engineering; Physical Intelligence; Soft robotics
- Awards: Falling Walls Breakthrough of the Year Award (Engineering and Technology Category) (2020); ERC Advanced Grant (2019); Member, Turkish Academy of Sciences (2019); Rahmi Koç Science Prize (2018); Best Paper Award, RSS (2019); Best Medical Robotics Award Finalist, ICRA (2018, 2017); IEEE/ASME Best Mechatronics Paper Award (2014); IEEE Fellow (2014); Best Poster Award, Adhesion Conference (2014); SPIE Nanoengineering Pioneer Award (2011); Best Paper Award, IROS (2009 and 1998); Distinguished Lecturer, IEEE Robotics and Automation Society (2006-2008); National Science Foundation CAREER Award (2005); Best Biomimetics Paper Award, ROBIO (2004); Best Video Award, ICRA (2002); Japanese Ministry of Education PhD Fellowship (1996–1999)
- Scientific career
- Fields: Robotics; Materials Science; Microtechnology; Nanotechnology; Biomedical engineering; Medicine
- Workplaces: Max Planck Institute for Intelligent Systems; ETH Zurich; Koç University; University of Stuttgart
- Website: pi.is.mpg.de/person/sitti

Metin Sitti is the Director of the Physical Intelligence Department at the Max Planck Institute for Intelligent Systems in Stuttgart, which he founded in 2014. He is also a Professor in the Department of Information Technology and Electrical Engineering at ETH Zurich, a Professor at the School of Medicine and College of Engineering at Koç University and co-founder of Setex Technologies Inc. based in Pittsburgh, USA.

== Biography ==
Sitti received his BSc and MSc degrees in electrical and electronics engineering from Boğaziçi University in Istanbul in 1992 and 1994, respectively, and his Ph.D. degree in electrical engineering from the University of Tokyo in 1999. He was a research scientist at UC Berkeley from 1999 to 2002 and a Professor at the Department of Mechanical Engineering and Robotics Institute at Carnegie Mellon University from 2002 to 2014. He became a Director at the Max Planck Institute for Intelligent Systems in Stuttgart in 2014.

On November 9, 2020, Sitti was presented with the «Breakthrough of the Year» Award 2020 in the Engineering and Technology category at Falling Walls. In March 2019, he received an Advanced Grant from the European Research Council (ERC). In 2019, Sitti and his team received the Best Paper Award at the Robotics Science and Systems Conference for their invention of a jellyfish-inspired soft millirobot with medical functions.

Sitti also received the Rahmi Koç Medal of Science (2018), Best Paper Award in the Robotics Science and Systems Conference (2019), IEEE/ASME Best Mechatronics Paper Award (2014), SPIE Nanoengineering Pioneer Award (2011), Best Paper Award in the IEEE/RSJ Intelligent Robots and Systems Conference (1998, 2009), and NSF CAREER Award (2005). He is the editor-in-chief of both Progress in Biomedical Engineering and Journal of Micro-Bio Robotics, and an associate editor for both Science Advances and Extreme Mechanics Letters.

Sitti has published two books and over 460 peer-reviewed papers, over 300 of which have appeared in archival journals. His group's research breakthroughs have been featured in the popular press, such as New York Times, Wall Street Journal, Le Monde, The Economist, Der Spiegel, Forbes, Süddeutsche Zeitung, Science, New Scientist Science News, Nature News, MIT Technology Review, IEEE Spectrum Magazine and Stuttgarter Zeitung. He has given over 200 invited keynote, plenary or distinguished seminars in universities, conferences and industry. He has over 12 issued patents and over 15 pending patents.

== Research ==
=== Overview ===
Metin Sitti is a pioneer in wireless tiny medical robots, gecko-inspired adhesives, and bio-inspired miniature robots. His group, called the Physical Intelligence Department, strives to understand the principles of design, locomotion, control, perception, and learning of small-scale mobile robots. Sitti and his team aim to encode intelligence (e.g., sensing, actuation, control, memory, logic, computation, adaptation, learning and decision-making capabilities) into robots. They use smart stimuli-responsive materials, structures and mechanisms to encode intelligence into the physical body of a robot.

== Entrepreneurship ==
Metin Sitti co-founded Setex Technologies Inc. in Pittsburgh, USA in 2012 to commercialize his lab's gecko-inspired microfiber adhesive technology as a new disruptive adhesive material (branded as Setex®) for a wide range of industrial applications.
