= Ozgur B. Akan =

Professor in Electrical Engineering

Özgür Barış Akan is a Professor at the Department of Electrical and Electronics Engineering and the Head of the Internet of Everything (IoE) Group, Department of Engineering, University of Cambridge, and the Director of the Centre for NeXt-Generation Communications (CXC), Koç University in Istanbul, Turkey. He was named a Fellow of the Institute of Electrical and Electronics Engineers (IEEE) in 2016 for contributions to wireless sensor networks. Since the same year, he is also a fellow of the Vehicular Technology Society.

== Early life and education ==
Akan was born in Ankara, Turkey. He attended Ankara Science High School, and after graduation from it, went to study in Bilkent University. After obtaining BSc in electrical and electronics engineering from Bilkent in June 1999, he studied for an MSc degree at Middle East Technical University, where in January 2002 he graduated with it in the same field. Akan received the PhD degree in electrical and computer engineering in 2004, after studying at the Broadband and Wireless Networking Laboratory at Georgia Tech under the supervision of Ian Akyildiz. Following graduation, he joined the Department of Electrical and Electronics Engineering at the Middle East Technical University, serving there until August 2010. From January 2013 to May 2016, Akan served as associate and then as director of Graduate School of Sciences and Engineering.
