= İrşadi Aksun =

Turkish electrical engineer (born 1957)

M. İrşadi Aksun
- Born: 5 April 1957 (age 69)
- Education: Middle East Technical University,University of Illinois
- Occupations: electrical and electronics engineer
- Awards: TÜBİTAK

M. İrşadi Aksun (born 5 April 1957) is a Turkish professor of electrical and electronics engineering and the dean of College of Engineering at Koç University. He received his bachelor's and master's degrees from Middle East Technical University and his Ph.D. degree from the University of Illinois in 1990.

He returned to Turkey when he started to work in Bilkent University back in 1992. He passed to Koç University in 2001 as a professor of engineering and became the dean of College of Engineering in 2004. He received a TÜBİTAK award for his project on multi layer electronic circuits.
