= Süreyya Ciliv =

Turkish American business executive

Sureyya Ciliv
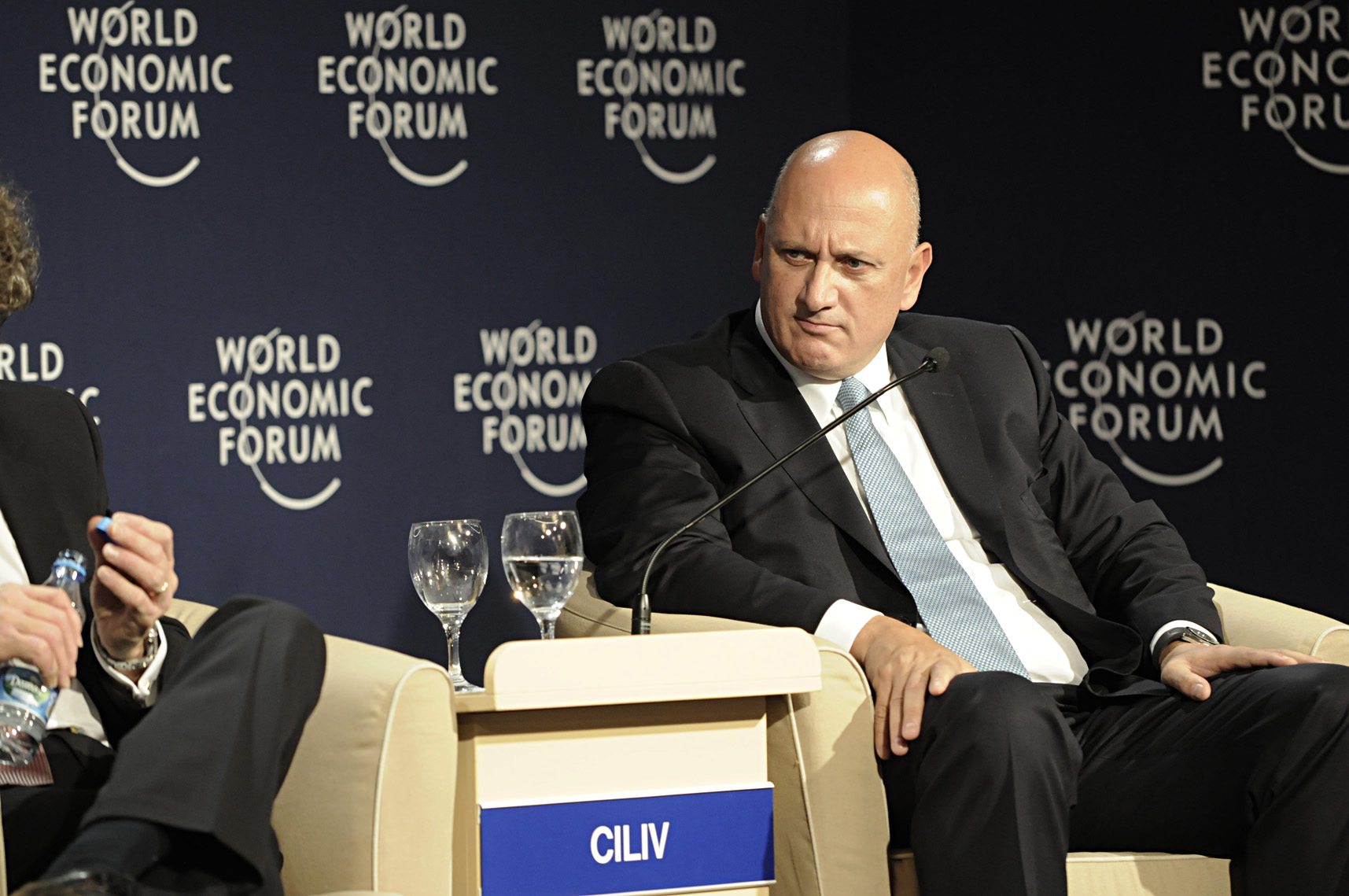
- Sureyya Ciliv at the World Economic Forum on Europe and Central Asia in Istanbul, 2008.
- Born: 1958 (age 67–68); Zonguldak, Turkey
- Education: Ankara Science High School; Middle East Technical University; University of Michigan (BS); Harvard Business School (MBA)
- Occupations: Chairman of System Capital; Chairman of Kuika; Former CEO of Turkcell

Sureyya Ciliv is a business executive who is currently Chairman of System Capital, System Morgan and Kuika Inc. Between 2007 and 2015, Ciliv was the Chief Executive Officer (CEO) of Turkcell Group, the leading technology and communications company in Turkey, a NYSE-listed company with 72 million subscribers in 8 countries. Previously, he held executive positions at Microsoft Corporation between 1997 and 2007. Sureyya Ciliv received the Global CEO of the Year Award at World Communication Awards in 2009.

== Biography ==
After spending a year at Middle East Technical University in 1976, Sureyya Ciliv graduated summa cum laude from the University of Michigan in 1981 with degrees in Industrial and Operations Engineering and Computer Engineering. He completed his MBA at Harvard Business School in 1983.

Ciliv served as the president and CEO of Novasoft Systems Inc., a company he co-founded in Boston, MA. In 1997, he was appointed as the CEO of Microsoft Turkey, and held the position for 3 years. Between 2000 and 2007, he served in various executive management positions at Microsoft Office, Global Sales, Marketing in Redmond, WA. In 2007, he was appointed as the CEO of Turkcell. Under his tenure, Turkcell was globally recognized as a leader in telecommunications and mobile services, elected as the "Most Admired Company" in Turkey seven times in 8 years.
