= Lale Akarun =

Turkish electrical engineer and computer scientist

- Born: 10 March 1962 (age 64); Ankara, Turkey
- Education: Boğaziçi University (BS, MS); Polytechnic University (PhD)
- Scientific career
- Fields: Gesture recognition, human–computer interaction, biometrics
- Institutions: Boğaziçi University
- Doctoral advisor: Richard A. Haddad

Lale Akarun (born 10 March 1962) is a Turkish electrical engineer and computer scientist researching sign language and gesture recognition, human–computer interaction, and biometrics. She is a professor in the computer engineering department and ex-vice rector at Boğaziçi University.

== Early life and education ==
Lale Akarun was born on 10 March 1962 in Ankara. She completed a B.S. (1984) and M.S. (1986) in electrical engineering at Boğaziçi University. She earned a Ph.D. in electrical engineering from Polytechnic University in 1992. Her dissertation was titled Decimated Rank Order Filtering.

== Career and research ==
Akarun joined the faculty at Boğaziçi University in 1992 as an assistant professor. She was promoted to the rank of professor in the computer engineering department in 2002. She served as departmental chair from 2010 to 2012. In 2012, she became vice rector of the university.

Akarun researches sign language and gesture recognition, human–computer interaction, and biometrics.
