= Cem Ersoy =

Cem Ersoy is a professor at the department of computer engineering at Boğaziçi University, and the President of the IEEE Communications Society Turkish Chapter. Following his election as the head of society, IEEE COMSOC Turkey Section received the Region 8 achievement award for its activities. Also, he is representing Turkey in the European Union ICT COST Action WiNeMO: Wireless Networks for Moving Objects.

== Early life and education ==
Cem Ersoy received his BS and MS degrees in electrical engineering from Boğaziçi University, Istanbul, in 1984 and 1986, respectively. He received his Ph.D. in electrical engineering from Polytechnic University, Brooklyn, New York in 1992.

== Career ==
Ersoy joined Boğaziçi University as a faculty member in 1992. He initiated the IEEE student branch of Boğaziçi University as its counsellor and also initiated a series of IEEE Student Summer Conferences. He established the first computer networks research laboratory (NETLAB) in Turkey together with M. Ufuk Caglayan.

He was in the organizing committee of IEEE International Symposium on Computer Communications 2003 and IEEE International Symposium on Computer Networks 2006. He was TPC member for many national and international scientific meetings such as Symposium on European Wireless Sensor Networks (EWSN 2012), Wireless Personal Mobile Computing (WPMC 2012), International Conference on ITS Telecommunications (ITST’2011), Learning Intelligent Optimization (LION 2007).
