= Duygu Kuzum =

Electrical engineer and academic

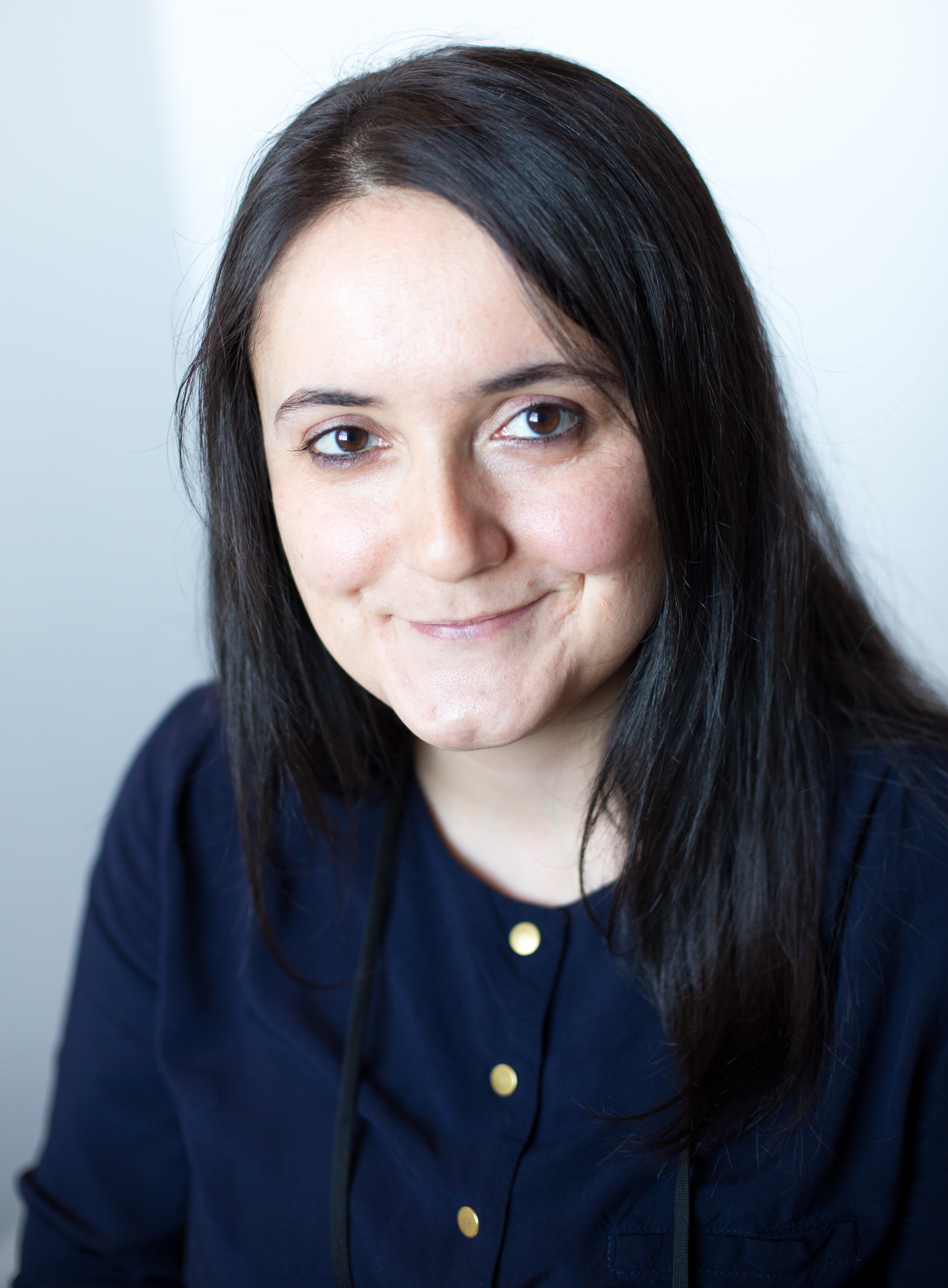
- Kuzum at PopTech 2013
- Born: 1983 (age 42–43); Ankara
- Education: Stanford University; Bilkent University
- Scientific career
- Workplaces: Jacobs School of Engineering, UCSD; University of Pennsylvania
- Thesis: Interface-engineered Ge MOSFETs for future high performance CMOS applications (2010)

Duygu Kuzum (born 1983) is a Turkish-American electrical engineer who is a professor at the University of California, San Diego's Jacobs School of Engineering. She develops transparent neural sensors based on single-layer materials. She was awarded a National Institutes of Health New Innovator Award in 2020.

== Early life and education ==
Kuzum was born in Ankara, Turkey. She became interested in science as a child. She attended Bilkent University and was a doctoral researcher at Stanford University. Her doctoral research considered MOSFETs for CMOS applications. During her doctorate, she completed an internship at Intel. In 2011, she joined the University of Pennsylvania as a postdoctoral researcher, working in the Center for Neuroengineering and Therapeutics on the development of transparent neural electrodes.

== Research and career ==
Kuzum joined the University of California, San Diego in 2015. Her research focuses on innovative computation strategies based on neural networks. She combines molecular neural sensors with machine learning to better understand neural processes. She has built self-assembled structures from stem cells embedded with controllable neural sensors to mimic the embryonic human brain.

== Awards ==
- 2013 Poptech Fellow
- 2014 MIT Technology Review Innovators under 35
- 2016 Office of Naval Research Young Investigator Award
- 2017 IEEE Nanotechnology Council Young Investigator Award
- 2018 NSF Career Award
- 2018 National Institutes of Health NIBIB Trailblazer Award
- 2020 National Institutes of Health New Innovator Award
- 2025 Presidential Early Career Award for Scientists and Engineers

== Selected publications ==
- Duygu Kuzum; Rakesh G D Jeyasingh; Byoungil Lee; H-S Philip Wong (14 June 2011). "Nanoelectronic programmable synapses based on phase change materials for brain-inspired computing". Nano Letters. 12 (5): 2179–2186. doi:10.1021/NL201040Y. ISSN 1530-6984. PMID 21668029.
- Duygu Kuzum; Shimeng Yu; H-S. Philip Wong (2 September 2013). "Synaptic electronics: materials, devices and applications". Nanotechnology. 24 (38) 382001. doi:10.1088/0957-4484/24/38/382001. ISSN 0957-4484. PMID 23999572.
- Duygu Kuzum; Hajime Takano; Euijae Shim; et al. (20 October 2014). "Transparent and flexible low noise graphene electrodes for simultaneous electrophysiology and neuroimaging". Nature Communications. 5 5259. Bibcode:2014NatCo...5.5259K. doi:10.1038/NCOMMS6259. ISSN 2041-1723. PMC 4331185. PMID 25327632.
