= Koç University =

Private university in Istanbul, Turkey

- Koç Üniversitesi
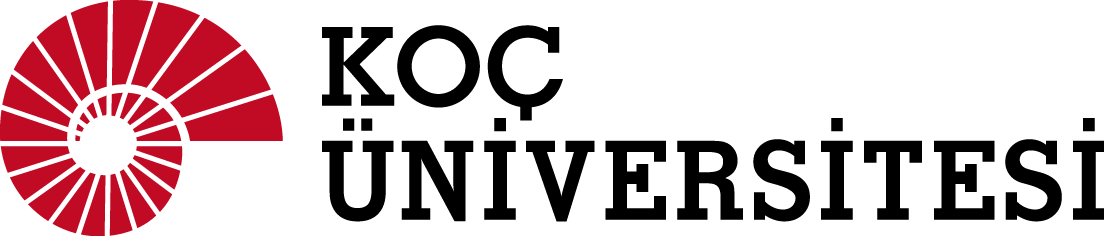
- Type: Private (Non-profit)
- Established: 1993; 33 years ago
- Affiliations: VKV; Erasmus; Bologna Process; EQUIS; CEMS; EFMD; AACSB; ANCC; TÜBİTAK; YÖK
- Chairman: Cem Kozlu
- President: Metin Sitti
- Vice-president: Hakan Ürey (Research and Development); Funda Acar Yağcı (Academic Affairs)
- Founder: Vehbi Koç
- Location: Sarıyer, Rumelifeneri, Istanbul, Turkey; 41°11′52″N 29°03′54″E
- Campus: Urban (Main campus in Rumelifeneri, other campuses in İstinye, Zekeriyaköy, ANAMED in Beyoğlu, Koç University Hospital in Topkapı, KWORKS in Şişli, AKMED in Antalya, VEKAM in Ankara.)
- University press: Koç University Press
- Nickname: Koç Rams
- Website: www.ku.edu.tr

Koç University (Turkish: Koç Üniversitesi) is a private non-profit research university in Istanbul, Turkey. Koç University comprises the Colleges of Social Sciences and Humanities, Administrative Sciences and Economics, Science, Engineering, Law, Nursing and Medicine. Koç University offers 22 undergraduate, 43 master's and 30 Ph.D. programs. The university is home to more than 8,000 students. The university accepts international students from various countries and has a network of over 250 partner-universities including the University of California, Northwestern University, Cornell University and Georgetown University.

The majority of classes at Koç University, exceeding 95%, are taught in English, with only a few exceptions in the School of Law and the School of Nursing.

== History ==
The university first began operations in 1993 in converted factory buildings in İstinye, Sarıyer. After the university moved to its new home at Rumelifeneri, the Istinye campus was remodelled to serve as a high-end conference and training center. Koç University's additional campuses and locations include the West Campus dormitories and residences in Rumelifeneri, Sarıyer; Koç University Hospital in Topkapı; ANAMED in Beyoğlu; KWORKS in Şişli, Istanbul; AKMED in Antalya; and Vehbi Koç Ankara Studies Research Center in Ankara. Koç University's central campus at Rumelifeneri is located north of Istanbul, overlooking the Bosphorus and the Black Sea. The campus has 60 buildings, covering 230,000 square meters of built area.

The Koç University Suna Kıraç Library has five branches and holds some 322,000 print volumes plus nearly 160,000 ebooks and 64,000 online serial titles. The library also holds about 2,000 rare materials in the areas of Ottoman and European history, literature and religion.

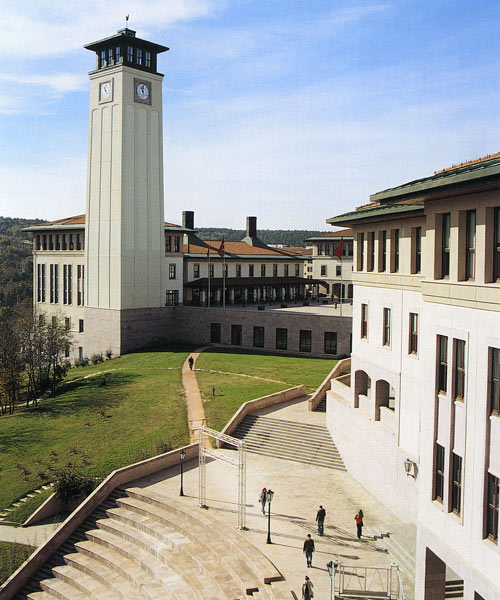
A view of Koç University's Clocktower in Rumelifeneri

Koç University's Rumelifeneri campus was designed by prominent Boston based American-Iranian architect Mozhan Khadem. Khadem is the chief design architect of all Koç University buildings as well as the master planner of its campus. According to Khadem, the architecture of the campus was inspired by light and the significance of the university's geographical location on the border between Europe and Asia. Khadem also sites inspiration from Turkish artistic and poetic heritage, the works of the Sufi poet Rumi, and Turkish and Ottoman architectural elements.

The campus is designed along an east–west axis, with its architecture symbolizing a gateway of knowledge and light. This concept is embodied in the university's Portal of Knowledge, the arched main entrance that represents both a gateway to knowledge and a connection between East and West. Situated among hills overlooking the Black Sea, the stepped architecture allows the campus to integrate within the steep contours of the surrounding terrain. The campus consists of a series of connected buildings surrounding a variety of interlocking courtyards. These courtyards draw on Ottoman architectural tradition and are replete with symbols of Turkish history and culture. The campus is compact and designed for pedestrians. Students and staff can move from place to place either through open courtyards or under cover. The campus utilizes a four by four meter modular design to accommodate different spatial needs.

The final stage of the Rumelifeneri campus construction plan was realized in 2018 with the completion of a sixth faculty building, an extension to the library, and several new dormitory buildings. Additionally, students of Koç University founded the American football team Koç Rams, also known as the Istanbul Rams which will play in the European League of Football in the 2022 season.

== Research ==
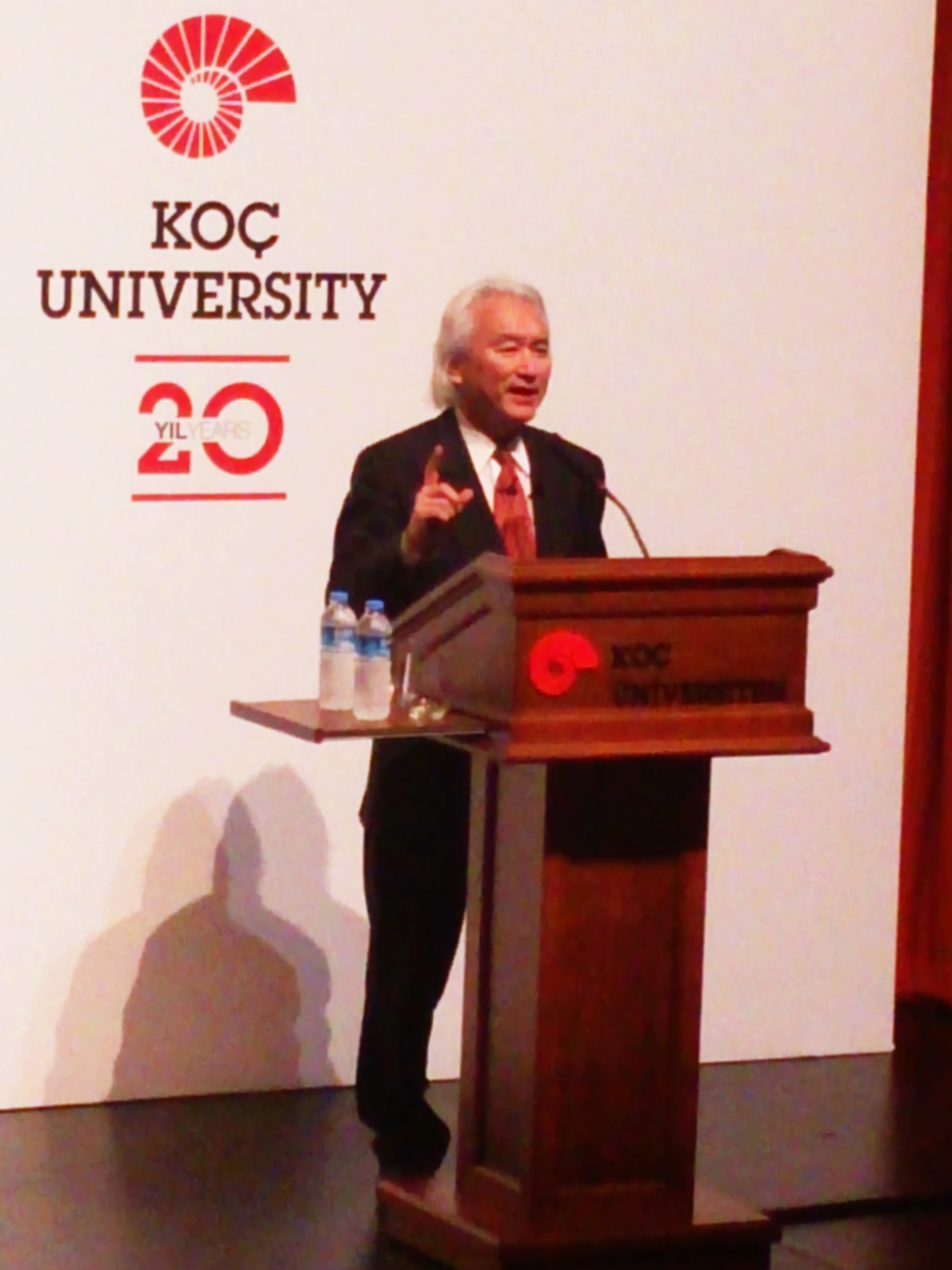
Michio Kaku's conference on "How Will Science Revolutionize the 21st Century?" for 20th anniversary of Koç University

Koç University is one of the leading research universities in Turkey and the region. The university strives to be a global center of research and aims to influence intellectual, technological, economic and social developments on a global scale.

Koç University has been the top recipient of the Scientific and Technological Research Council of Turkey research awards. Koç University is also the most successful higher education institution in Turkey in bids for European Research Council grants, coordinating 8 of the 15 active projects in Turkey as of March 2018. In addition, Koç University is the best performing institution, including industry organizations, in Turkey after TÜBİTAK in the European Commission's Horizon 2020 funding scheme. The university is currently hosting 10.2 million Euros worth of Horizon 2020 projects. Between 2004 and 2017 the university was awarded a total of 761 externally funded projects valued at US$86 million.

The university has 132 research laboratories, 20 research centers, and 5 research and education forums.

== Faculties, departments and schools ==
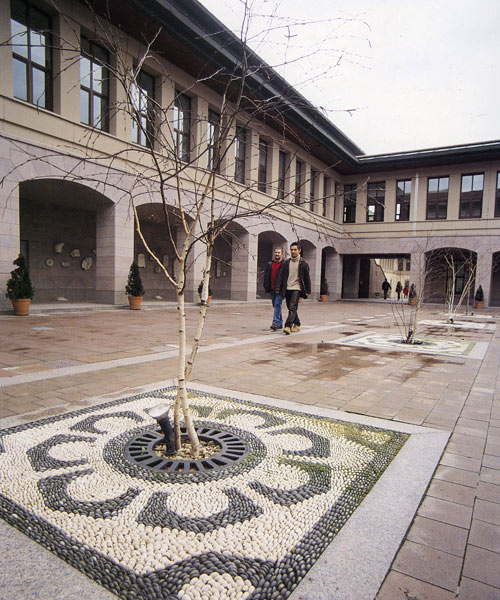
The courtyard of Koç University's Rumelifeneri Campus

Koç University has the following academic units:

- College of Administrative Sciences and Economics (CASE)
- College of Sciences (CS)
- College of Social Sciences and Humanities (CSSH)
- College of Engineering (CE)
- Law School
- School of Medicine (SOM)
- School of Nursing (SON)
- Graduate School of Business (GSB)
- Graduate School of Sciences & Engineering (GSSE)
- Graduate School of Social Sciences & Humanities (GSSSH)
- Health Sciences Institute (GSHS)

== Rankings ==
The Times Higher Education World University Rankings ranked Koç University as follows:

University rankings

Global – Overall
- CWTS World: 1031 (2020)
- QS World: 323 (2026)
- THE World: 301-350 (2026)
- USNWR Global: =679 (2023)

Regional – Overall
- QS Emerging Europe and Central Asia: 15 (2022)

Year	Turkey	Asia	BRICS and Emerging Economies	Young Universities	World
2013	3rd	31st	N/A	31st	226-250th
2014	5th	40th	20th	41st	276-300th
2015	6th	47th	29th	51st	301-350th
2016	1st	21st	13th	36th	251-300th
2017	1st	27th	15th	36th	251-300th
2018	1st	31st			301-305th
2022	1st				401-501st

The same organization listed Koç University as follows in their annual World University Rankings by Subject:

Year	Subject	Turkey	In the world
2018	Social Sciences	1st	151-175th
2018	Engineering & Technology	1st (Jointly with Bilkent)	201-250th
2018	Physical Sciences	1st	301-400th
2018	Clinical, Pre-Clinical & Health	1st	401-500th

Other rankings such as the QS World University Rankings largely agree with the Times Rankings.

=== Graduate School of Business ===
The QS World University Rankings: Business Masters Rankings 2018 ranked Koç University Graduate School of Business Master programs in Finance and Management as follows:

Year	Program	Turkey	In the world
2018	Masters in Finance	1st	52nd
2018	CEMS Masters in International Management	1st	93rd

The Financial Times rankings place Koç University Graduate School of Business and its programs as follows:

Financial Times European Business School Ranking

Year	Turkey	In Europe
2015	1st	66th
2016	1st	67th
2017	1st	65th
2018	N/A	N/A

Financial Times Executive MBA Ranking

Year	Turkey	In Europe	In the world
2015	1st	28th	59th
2016	1st	31st	64th
2017	1st	37th	76th
2018	N/A	N/A	N/A

In 2017, the CEMS Masters in International Management (CEMS MIM) was ranked 9th in the Financial Times Masters in Management Ranking. Koç University Graduate School of Business is one of the 30 university members of the CEMS Alliance of Business Schools offering this program.

== People ==
=== Presidents ===
- Seha Tiniç (1993–2001)
- Attila Aşkar (2001–2009)
- Ümran İnan (2009–2021)
- Metin Sitti (2023–)

=== Notable faculty ===
- Ümran İnan – Scientist, B.Sc. and M.Sc. at Middle East Technical University, Ph.D. at Stanford University
- İrşadi Aksun – Engineer, B.Sc. and M.Sc. at Middle East Technical University, Ph.D. at University of Illinois
- Tekin Dereli – Theoretical physicist, B.Sc. and Ph.D. at Middle East Technical University
- Barış Tan – Industrial engineering professor, B.Sc. at Boğaziçi University, M.E. and Ph.D. at University of Florida
- Ziya Öniş – Political economist, B.Sc. and M.Sc. at London School of Economics, Ph.D. at University of Manchester
- Özgür Barış Akan – Engineer and information theorist, B.Sc. at Bilkent, M.Sc. at METU, Ph.D. at Georgia Tech
- Bertil Emrah Oder – Legal scholar, LL.B. at Istanbul University, LL.M. at Marmara, Ph.D. University of Cologne
- Can Yeğinsu – Barrister, international lawyer, and scholar, B.A. at University of Oxford, M.A. at Princeton University, LL.B. at City, University of London, LL.M. at Harvard Law School
- Zeynep Gürhan Canlı – Management scholar, B.Sc. and M.Sc. at Boğaziçi University, Ph.D. at New York University
- Alphan Sennaroğlu – Engineer and physicist, B.Sc., M.Sc. and Ph.D. at Cornell University
- Hakan Ürey – Engineer, B.Sc. at METU, M.Sc. and Ph.D. at Georgia Tech
- Aylin Küntay – Psychologist, B.Sc. at Boğaziçi University, M.Sc. and Ph.D. at University of California, Berkeley
- Attila Gürsoy – Computer scientist, B.Sc. at METU, M.Sc. at Bilkent, Ph.D. at University of Illinois Urbana-Champaign
- Funda Yağcı Acar – Medical researcher, B.Sc. and M.Sc. at Boğaziçi University, Ph.D. at University of Southern Mississippi
- Şükrü Dilege – Physician, M.D. at Istanbul University
- İhsan Solaroğlu – Physician, M.D. at Eskişehir Osmangazi University
- Şuhnaz Yılmaz Özbağcı – International relations scholar, B.Sc. at Bilkent, M.Sc. and Ph.D. at Princeton University

== Gallery ==
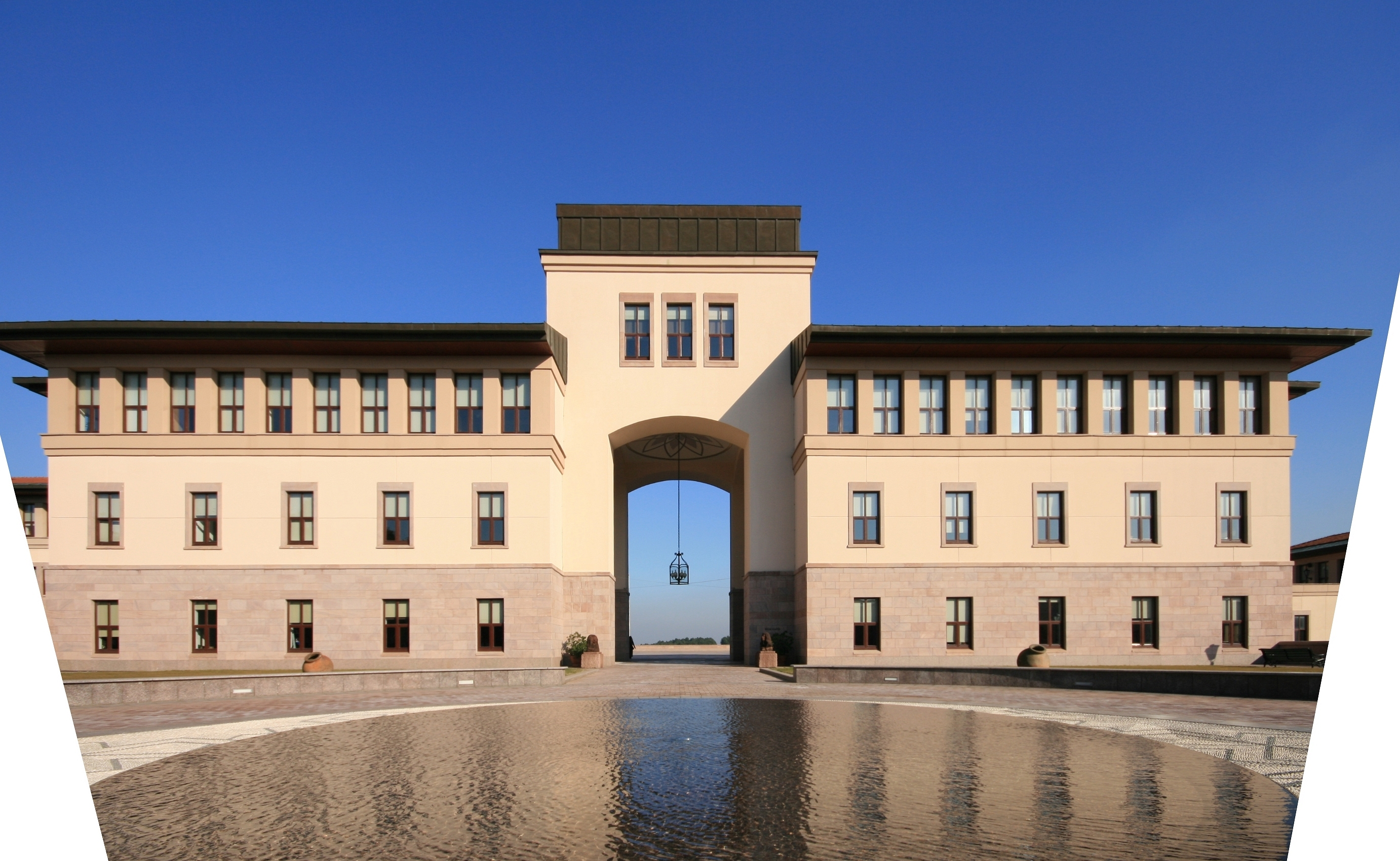
The Portal of Knowledge

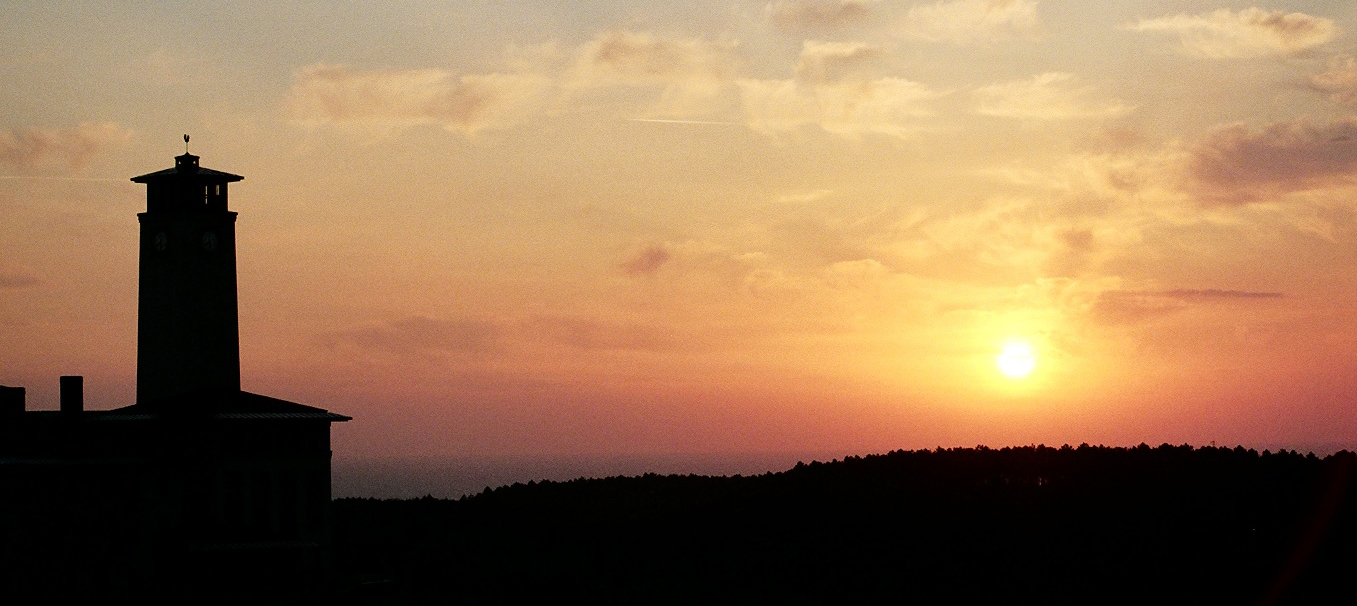
Sunrise at Koç University

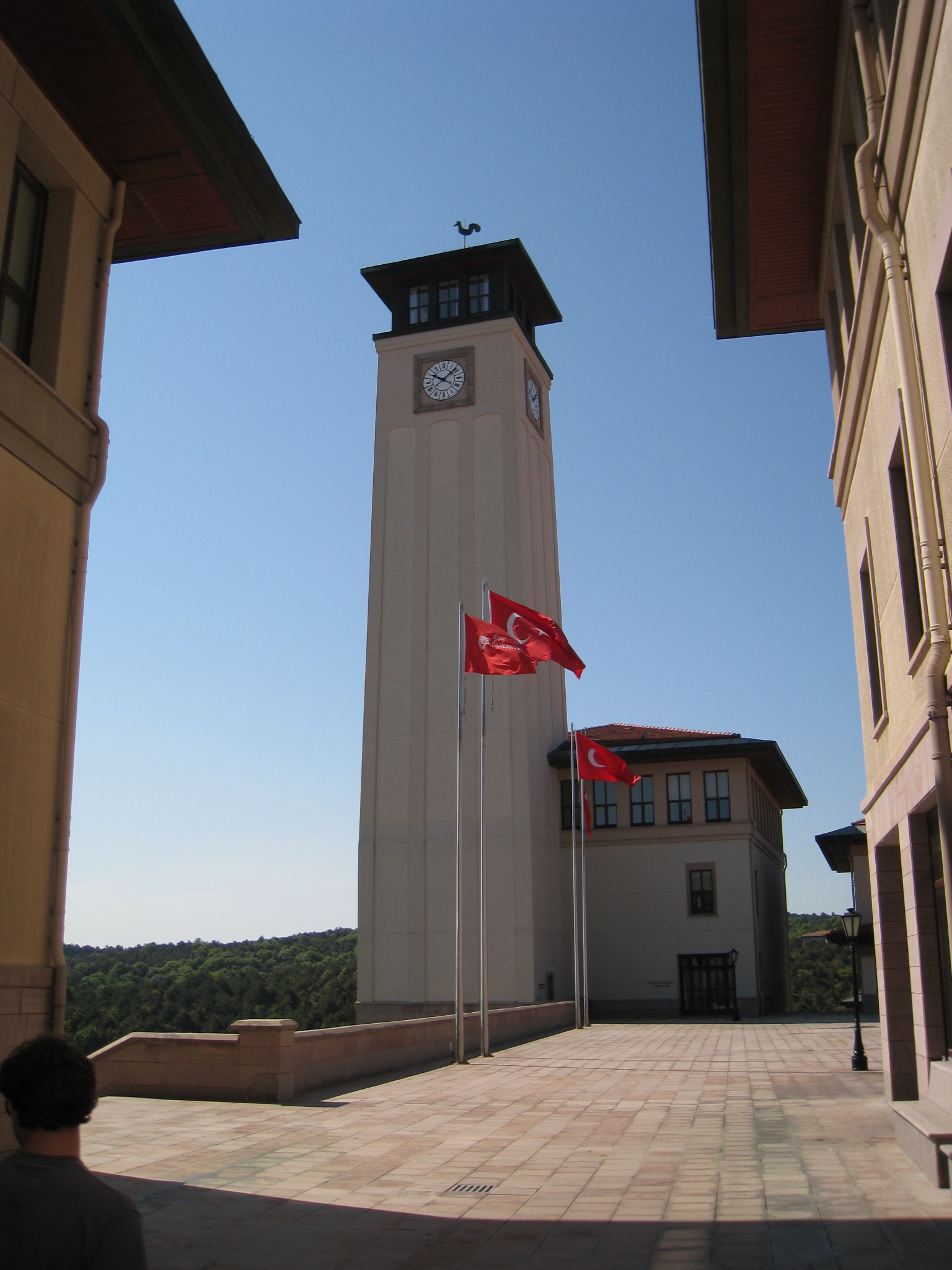
The Clock Tower

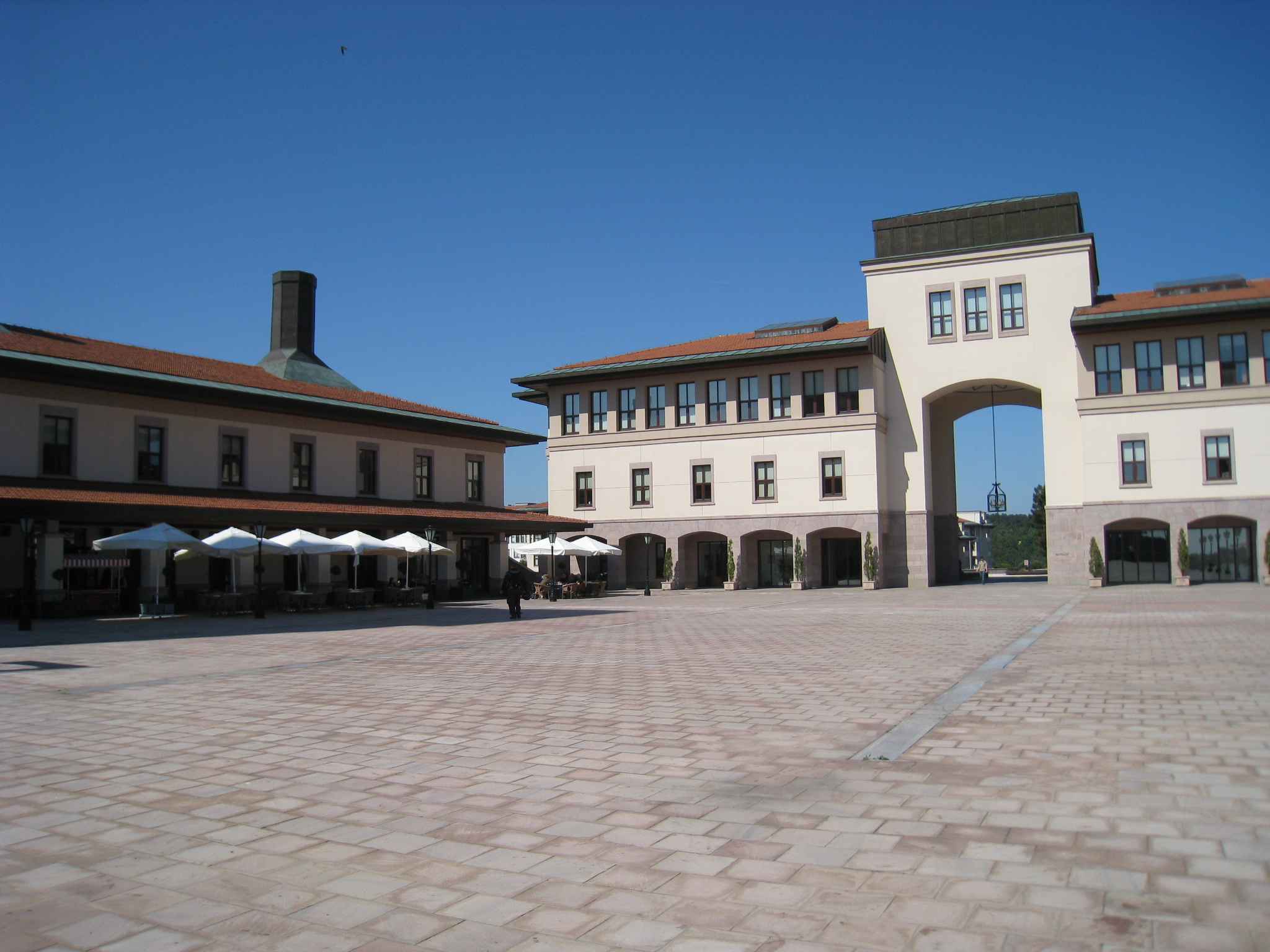
Main Plaza and Student Union

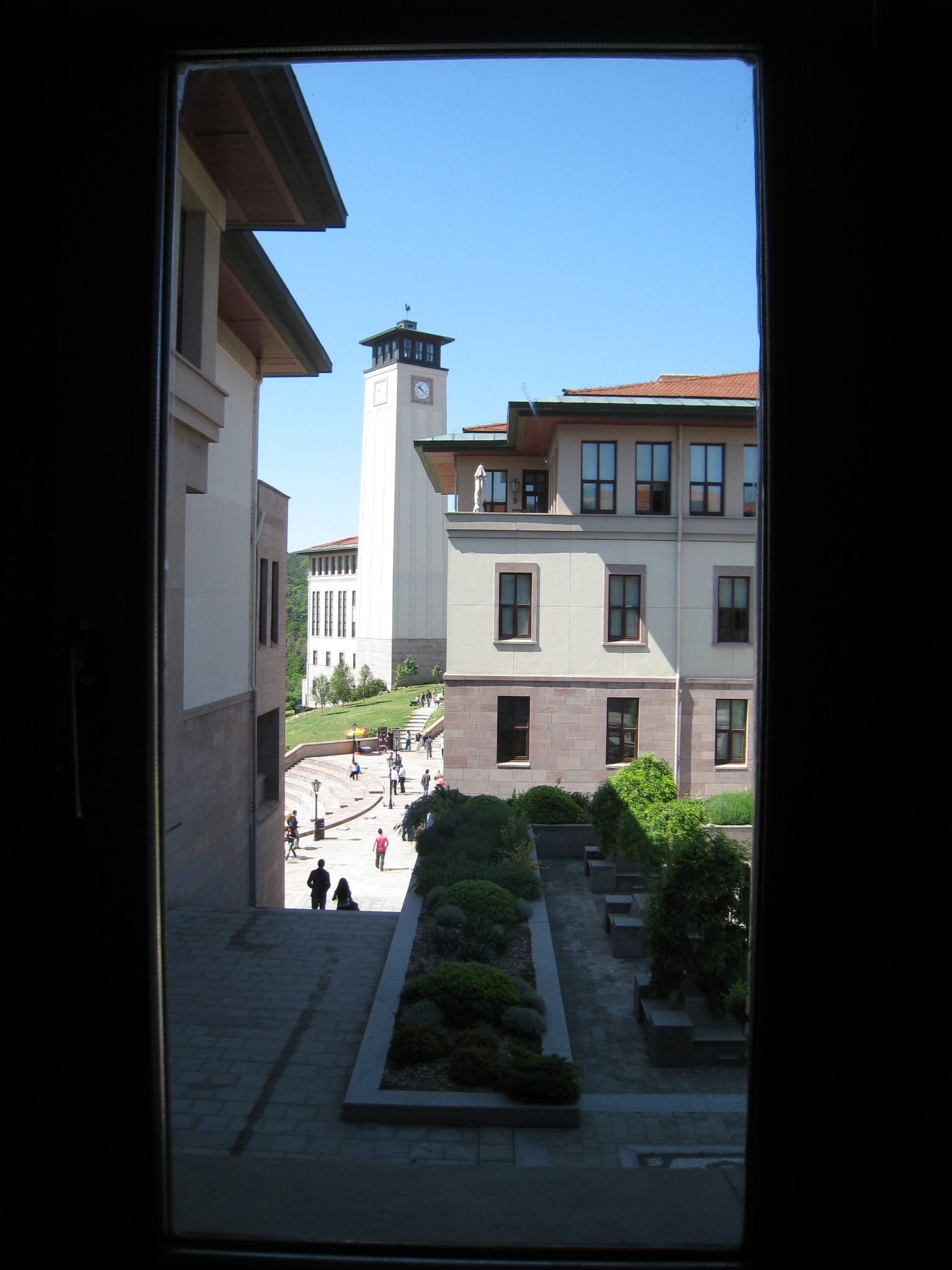
Interior of the Main Campus

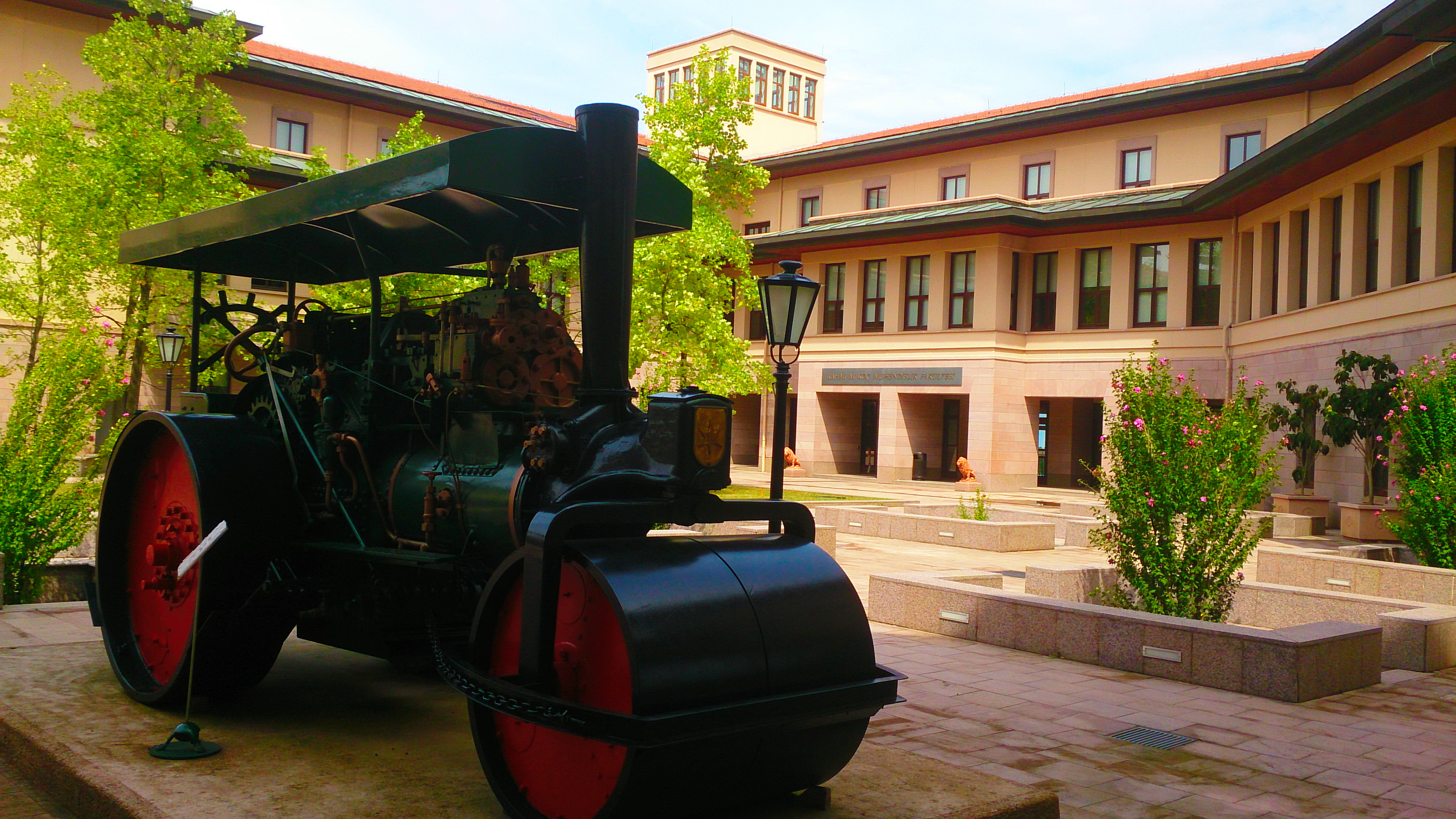
Rahmi M. Koç Faculty of Engineering

== See also ==
- Koç University Suna Kıraç Library
- Vehbi Koç Foundation
- Koç Holding
- Koç School
- Koç Rams
