= List of Turkish Americans =

The following is a list of notable Turkish Americans, including both original immigrants of full or partial Turkish descent who obtained American citizenship and their American descendants.

Most notable Turkish Americans have come from, or originate from, Turkey but there are also notable Americans of Turkish origin who have immigrated from, or descend from, the other former Ottoman territories, especially Turks from the Balkans, the island of Cyprus (e.g. Erden Eruç, Halil Güven, Hal Ozsan, Abdul Kerim al-Qubrusi, and Vamık Volkan, are of Turkish Cypriot origin), North Africa (e.g. Leila Ahmed and Nonie Darwish are of Turkish-Egyptian origin, and Mustapha Osman was of Turkish-Tunisian origin), and the Levant (e.g. Etel Adnan is of Turkish-Syrian origin; and Salih Neftçi are of Turkish-Iraqi origin; Nabila Khashoggi is from the Khashoggi family who are of Turkish origin).

Some Turkish Americans have also come to the US from areas where there is a modern Turkish diaspora; for example, Turhan Bey had a Turkish-Austrian background; Timothy Guy Kent has a Turkish Canadian background; Marie Tepe had a Turkish-French background; Ergun Caner has a Turkish-Swedish background; Kasim Edebali has a Turkish-German background; and Didem Erol has a Turkish Australian background.

== Academia ==
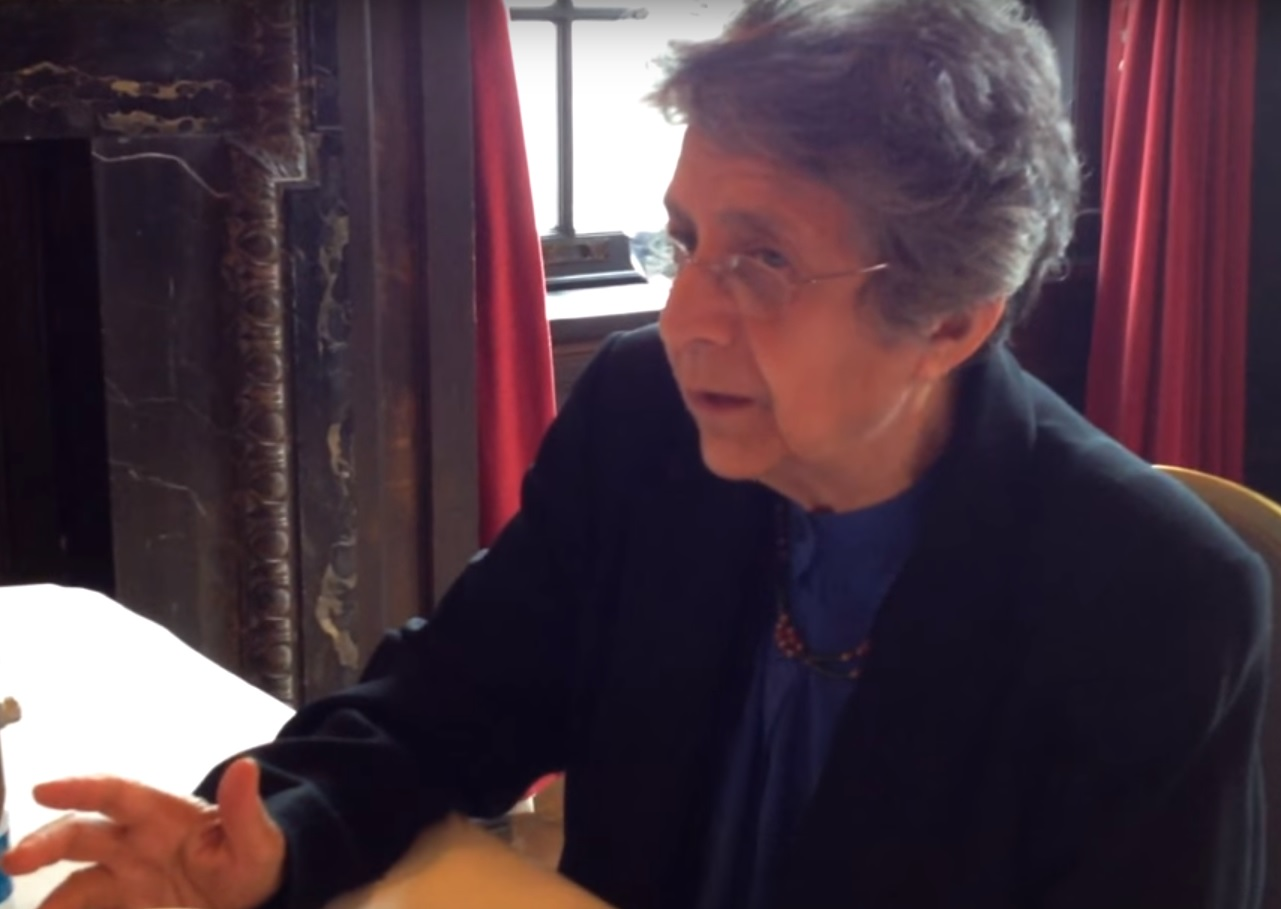
Leila Ahmed

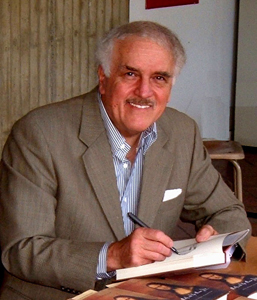
Bülent Atalay

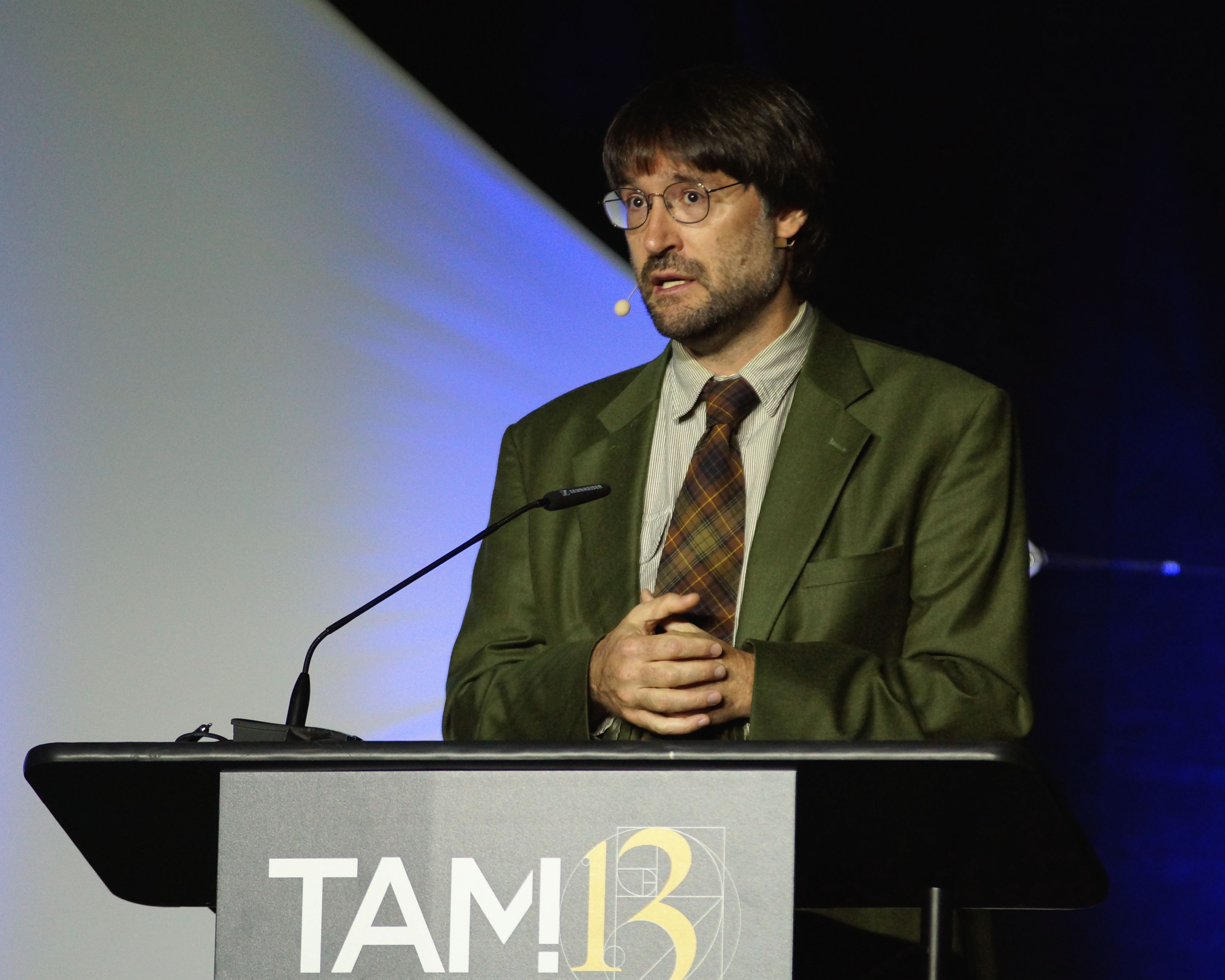
Taner Edis

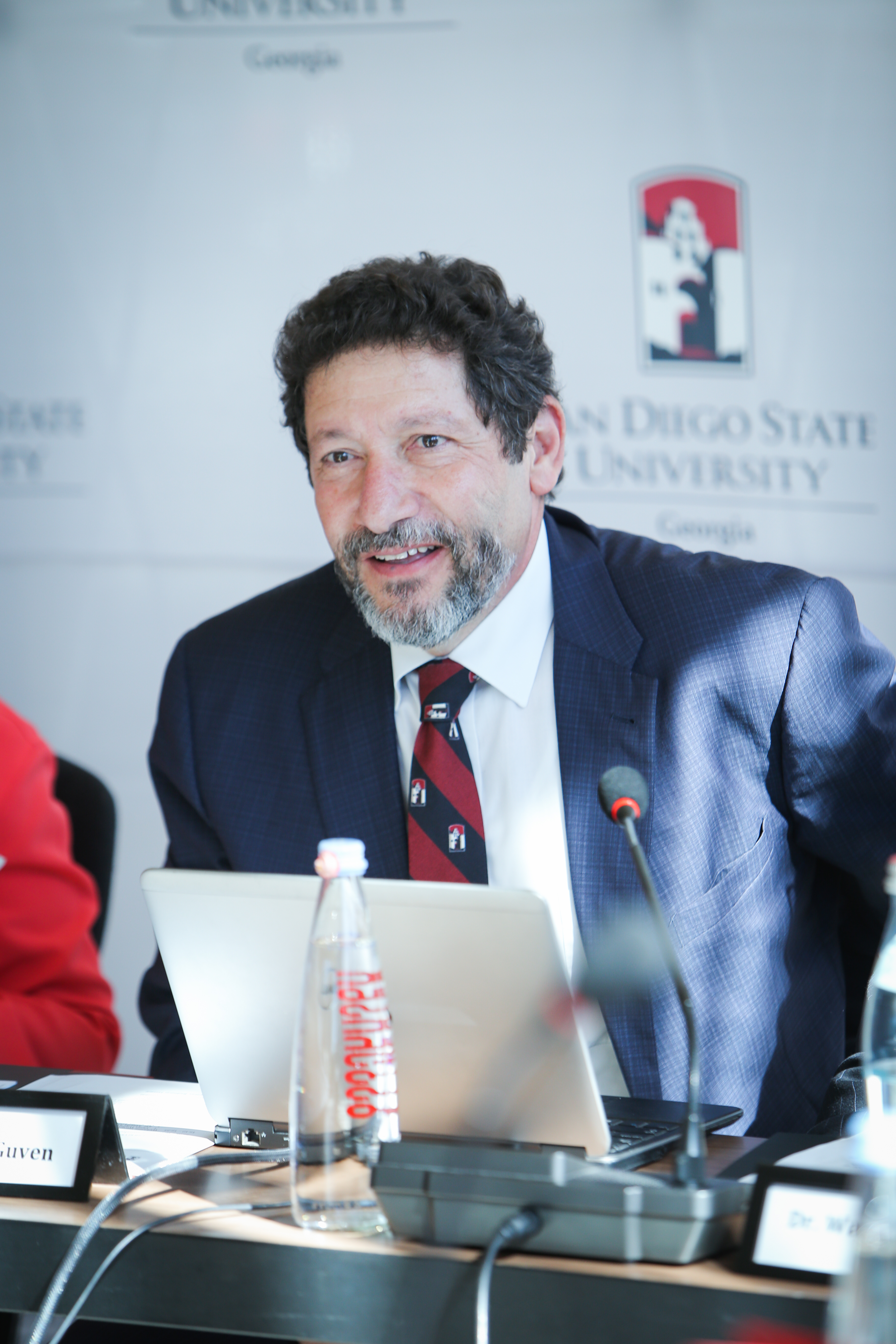
Halil Güven

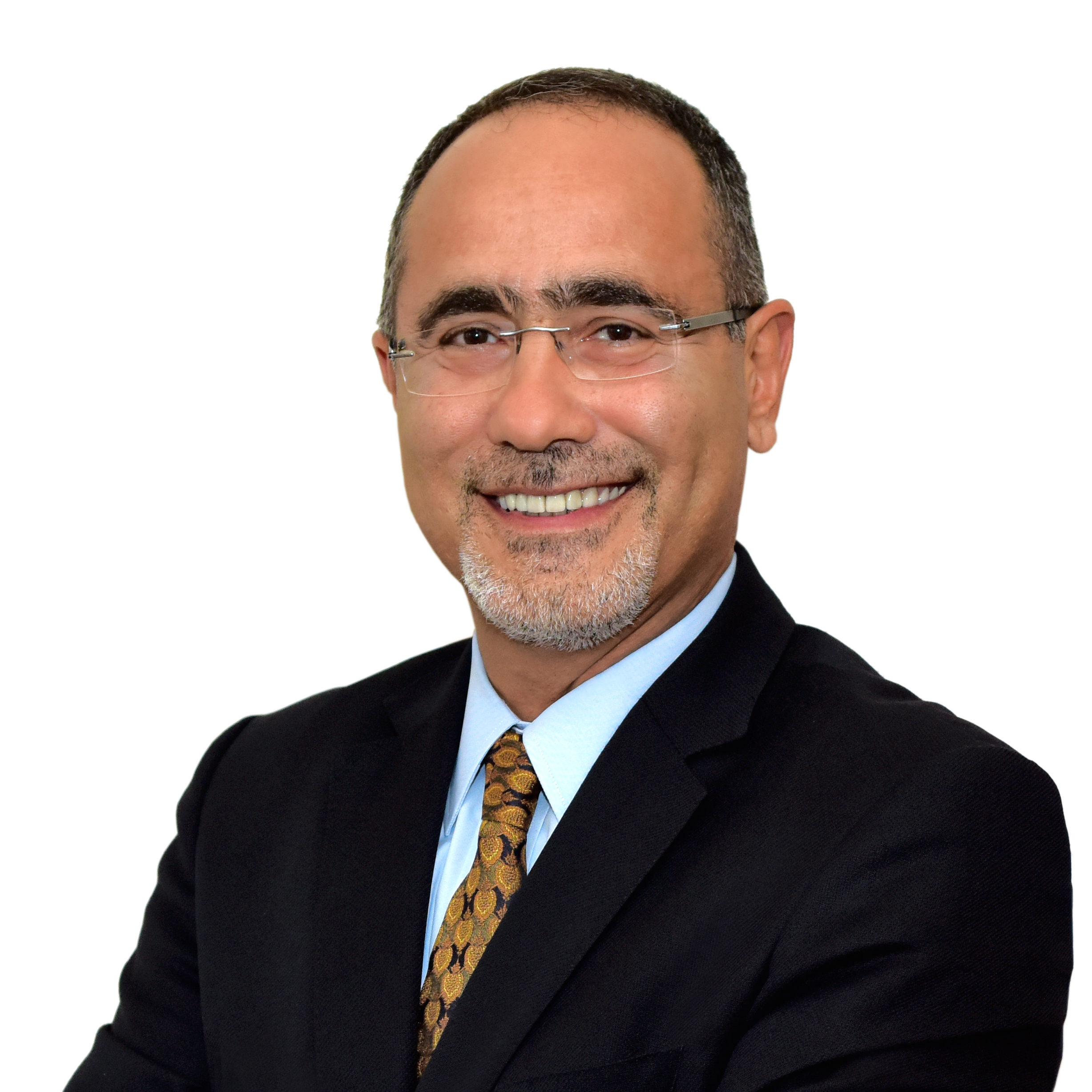
Gökhan S. Hotamisligil

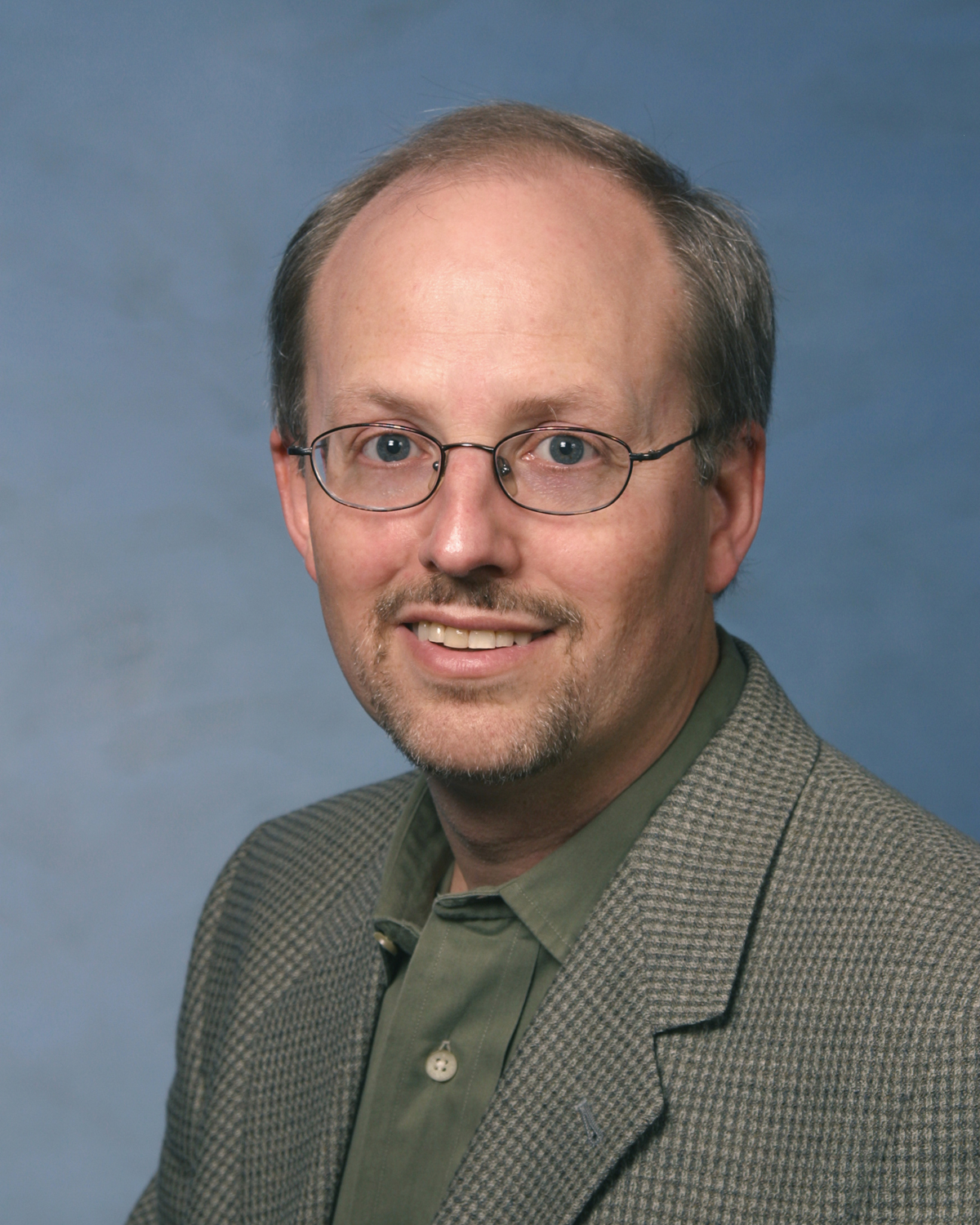
Timur Kuran

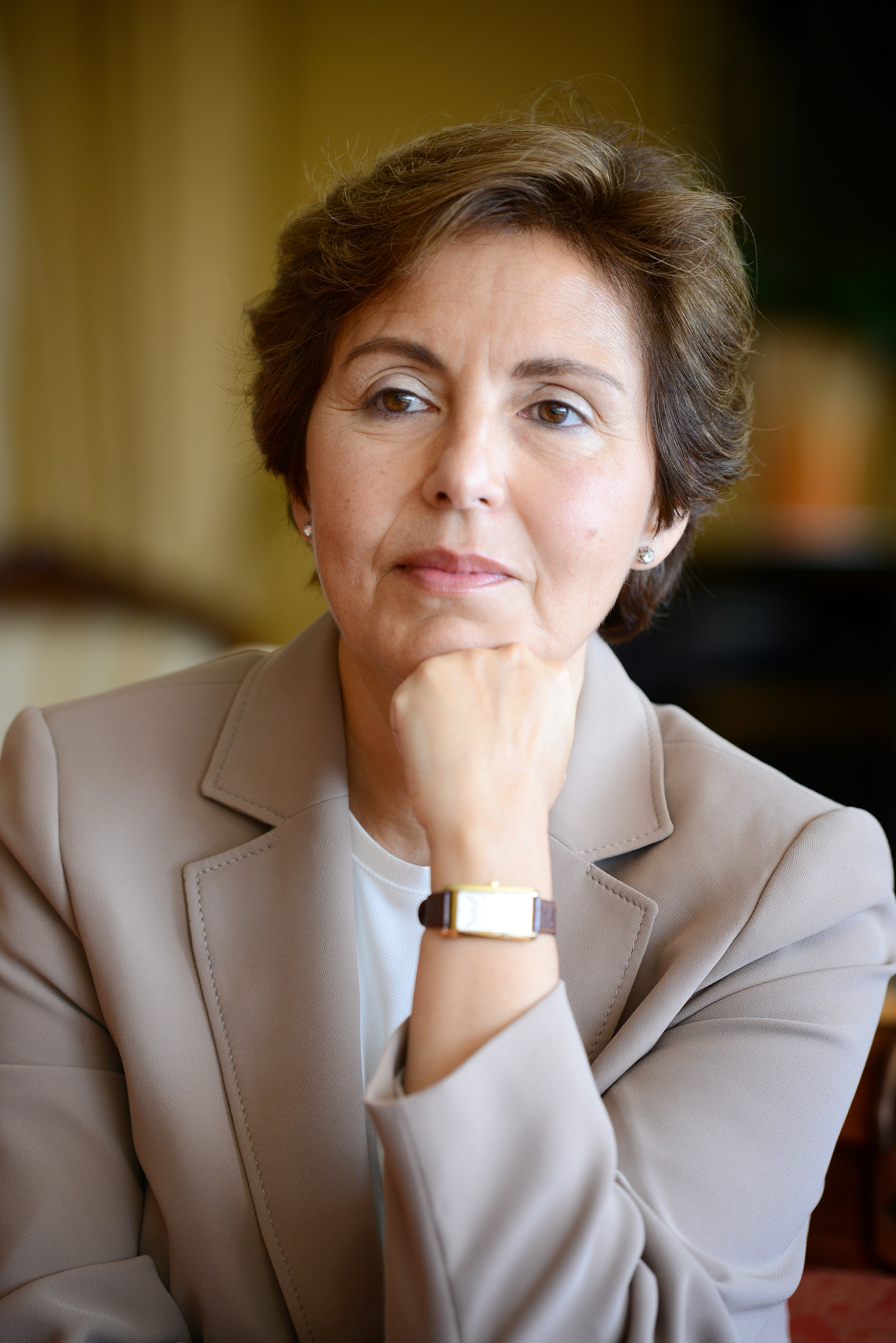
Gülru Necipoğlu

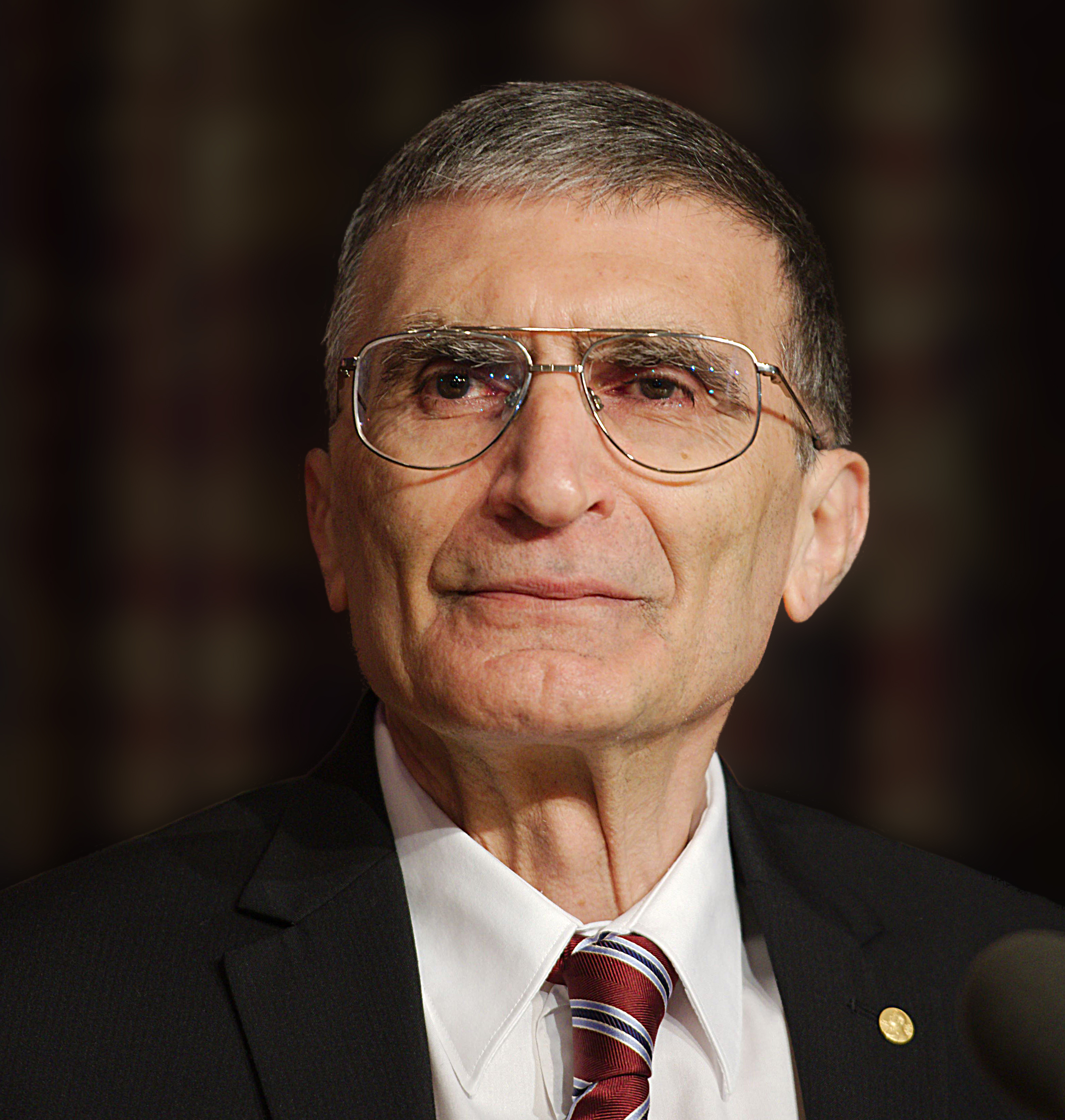
Aziz Sancar

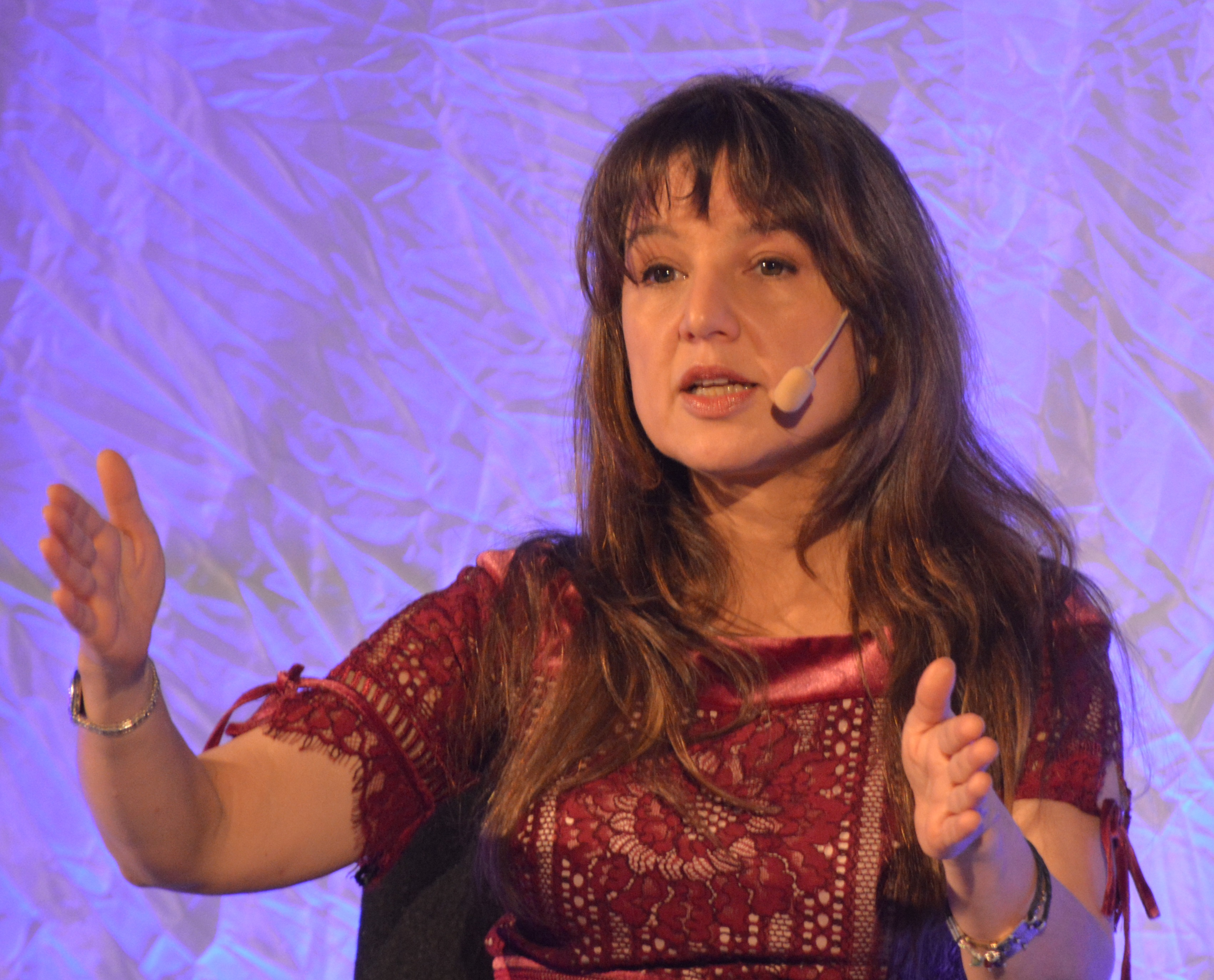
Zeynep Tufekci

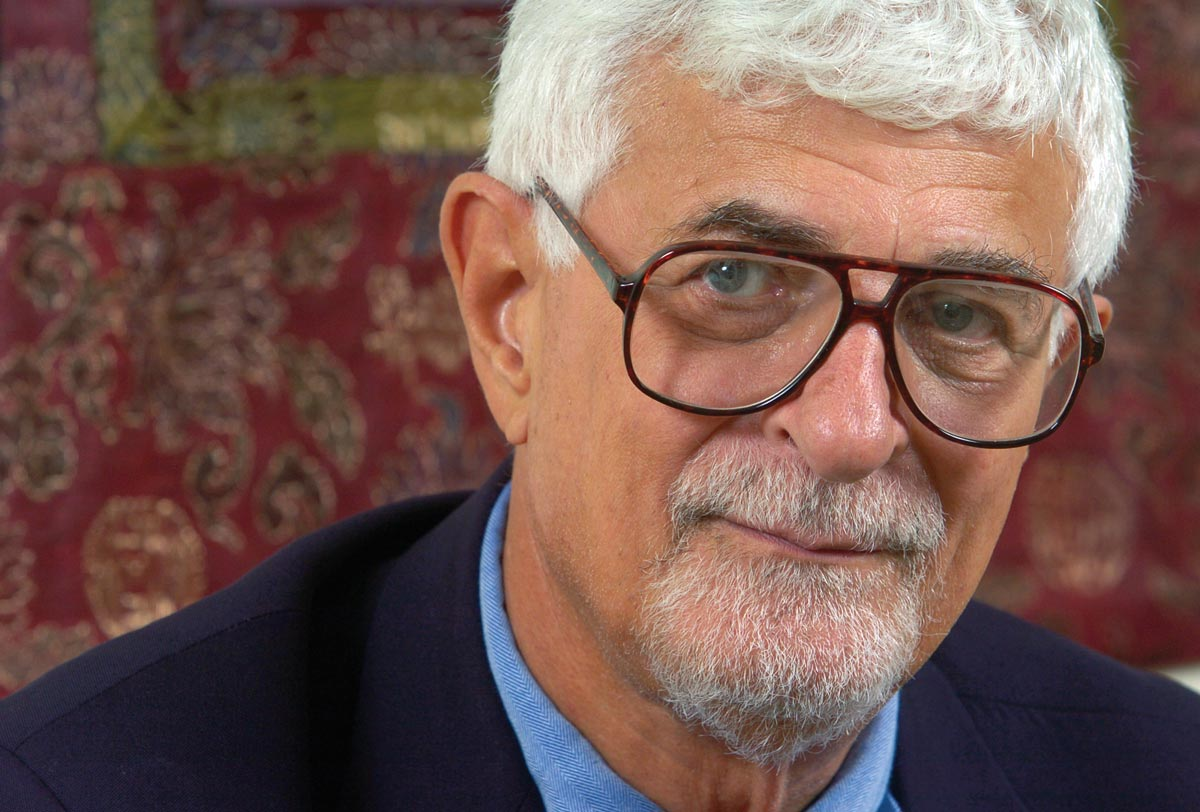
Vamık Volkan

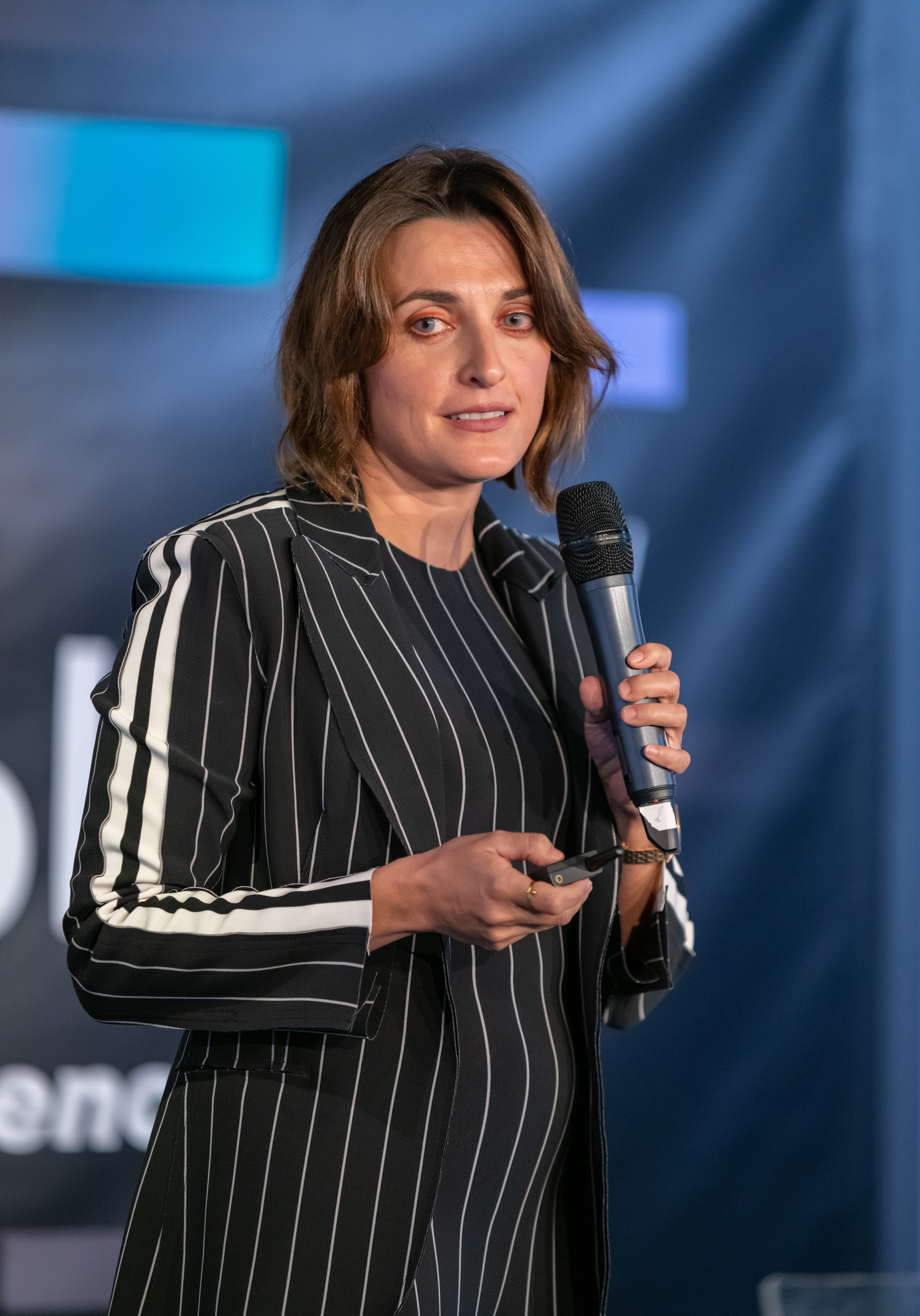
Pınar Yoldaş

- Sibel Adalı, Professor of Computer Science at Rensselaer Polytechnic Institute
- Leila Ahmed, Professor of Women's Studies in Religion at Harvard Divinity School
- Ali Akansu, Professor of Electrical and Computer Engineering at NJIT
- Murat Arcak, Professor of electrical engineering and computer science from the University of California, Berkeley
- Esra Akcan, Professor of Architecture at Cornell University
- Bilal Akin, Electrical engineer and faculty member of The University of Texas at Dallas.
- Mustafa Aksakal, professor of history at Georgetown University
- İlhan Aksay, Professor in Engineering and Emeritus Professor of Chemical and Biological Engineering at Princeton University
- Asuman Aksoy, Professor of Mathematics at Claremont McKenna College
- Serap Aksoy, Professor of Epidemiology (Microbial Diseases) at Yale University
- Ian F. Akyildiz, Chair Professor in Telecommunications
- Ilkay Altintas, Chief data science officer at the University of California
- H. Efsun Arda, Turkish developmental and systems biologist
- Ali Argon, Professor Emeritus at the Massachusetts Institute of Technology
- Ilke Arslan, Microscopist and Director of the Center for Nanoscale Materials and the Nanoscience and Technology division at Argonne National Laboratory
- Muzaffer Atac, Professor of Physics
- Sonya Atalay, professor of anthropology at the Massachusetts Institute of Technology
- Bülent Atalay, Professor of physics at the University of Mary Washington and the University of Virginia
- Esin Atıl, historian of Islamic art and curator of Islamic art at the Freer Gallery of Art
- Ozlem Ayduk, social psychologist at U.C. Berkeley
- Özalp Babaoğlu, Professor of computer science at University of Bologna
- Ivet Bahar, Professor of Computational Biology at University of Pittsburgh
- Mert Ozan Bahtiyar, Professor of Obstetrics, Gynecology & Reproductive Sciences
- A. Baha Balantekin, Professor of Physics at the University of Wisconsin
- Asım Orhan Barut, Professor of physics at the University of Colorado at Boulder
- Itzhak Bars, theoretical physicist at the University of Southern California in Los Angeles
- Tamer Başar, Professor at University of Illinois at Urbana-Champaign
- Elif Batuman, academic and journalist
- Nihat Berker, scientist, theoretical chemist, physicist and emeritus professor of physics at MIT
- Burcin Becerik-Gerber, Professor of Civil and Environmental Engineering at the University of Southern California
- Koray Caliskan, is a Turkish economic sociologist and organizational designer
- Soner Cagaptay, director of the Turkish Research Program at the Washington Institute for Near East Policy
- Gunduz Caginalp, Professor of Mathematics at University of Pittsburgh
- Emir Caner, President of Truett McConnell University
- Ergun Caner, Professor of Theology and Church History
- Tuncer Cebeci (1934–2021), engineer and academic
- Zeynep Çelik-Butler, Professor of Electrical Engineering at the University of Texas at Arlington.
- Aslı Çelikyılmaz, is an engineer
- Mine Çetinkaya-Rundel, Associate professor of the practice in statistics at Duke University
- Erhan Çınlar, Professor Emeritus at Princeton University
- Canan Dağdeviren, assistant professor at the Massachusetts Institute of Technology (MIT)
- Melik Demirel, Professor of Engineering Science and Mechanics at Pennsylvania State University
- Utkan Demirci, Professor at Stanford University School of Medicine
- Arif Dirlik, Professor at the University of British Columbia
- Servet A. Duran, Professor of Materials Science at Washington State University
- Gül Dölen, neuroscientist
- Dilek Huseyinzadegan, associate professor of philosophy at Emory University
- Taner Edis, Professor of physics at the Truman State University
- Merve Emre, Associate professor of American literature at Oxford University
- Mustafa Emirbayer, Professor of sociology at University of Wisconsin-Madison
- Ali Erdemir, Professor of Mechanical Engineering at Texas A&M University
- Fazıl Erdoğan, Professor and Dean of Mechanical Engineering and Mechanics at Lehigh University
- Tuncer Edil
- Funda Ergun, Professor of computer science at Indiana University Bloomington
- Ahmed Cemal Eringen, Professor of continuum mechanics at Princeton University
- Alev Erisir, Professor of Psychology and the department chair at the University of Virginia
- Elza Erkip, Professor and wireless technology researcher at New York University
- Cagla Eroglu, associate professor of cell biology and neurobiology at Duke University in Durham, North Carolina. Eroglu is also a leader in the field of glial biology
- Okan Ersoy, Professor of electrical engineering and Director of Statistical and Computational Intelligence Laboratory at Purdue University
- R. Cengiz Ertekin, professor of Marine Hydrodynamics
- Alper Erturk, Professor in the George W. Woodruff School of Mechanical Engineering at Georgia Institute of Technology
- Ozlem Goker-Alpan, physician-scientist
- Erdağ Göknar, Associate Professor of Turkish and Middle Eastern Studies at Duke University
- Selda Gunsel, Vice President (VP) for Global Commercial Technology at Royal Dutch Shell
- Murat Günel, Professor of Neurosurgery at Yale University
- Faruk Gül, Professor of Economics, Princeton University
- Umut A. Gurkan, Mechanical and biomedical engineer.
- Feza Gürsey, mathematician and physicist
- Suha Gürsey, physicist and mathematician
- Halil Güven, Dean of San Diego State University – Georgia
- Tuba Özkan-Haller, earth scientist
- M. Şükrü Hanioğlu, Professor of Near Eastern Studies, Princeton University
- Çiğdem Balım Harding, Senior lecturer at Indiana University
- Zeynep Hansen
- Peter Harzem, Professor of Psychology at Auburn University
- Ali Hortaçsu, Professor of Economics at the University of Chicago
- Gökhan S. Hotamisligil, Professor of Nutrition & Division of Biological Sciences at Harvard University
- Alp Ikizler, nephrologist, holder of the Catherine McLaughlin Hakim chair in Medicine at Vanderbilt University School of Medicine
- Ataç İmamoğlu, physicist
- Murat Iyigun, Professor of Economics at the University of Colorado
- Cemal Kafadar, Professor of Turkish Studies at Harvard University
- Pinar Karaca-Mandic, Professor of Healthcare Risk Management at the University of Minnesota
- Merve Kavakçı, George Washington University Professor and former Fazilet Party Parliamentarian
- Çetin Kaya Koç, cryptographic engineer, author, and academic
- C. Emre Koksal , professor of Electrical and Computer Engineering at Ohio State University
- Sebnem Kalemli-Ozcan, economist and the Schreiber Family Professor of Economics at Brown University
- Kemal Karpat, historian
- Dilhan M. Kalyon, chemical engineer
- Sündüz Keleş, statistician
- Pınar Keskinocak, Professor of Industrial and Systems Engineering at Georgia Institute of Technology
- Behram Kurşunoğlu, physicist
- Timur Kuran, Professor of Economics and Political Science, and Gorter Family Professor in Islamic Studies at Duke University
- Duygu Kuzum, professor at the University of California, San Diego's Jacobs School of Engineering
- Yahya M. Madra, Associate Professor of Economics at Drew University
- Naci Mocan, Ourso Distinguished Chair of Economics at Louisiana State University
- Gülru Necipoğlu, Professor and Director of the Aga Khan Program for Islamic Architecture at Harvard University
- Salih Neftçi, Professor of Economics at the New School University (Turkish-Iraqi origin)
- Caglar Oskay, engineer and Cornelius Vanderbilt Professor of Engineering at Vanderbilt University
- Necmiye Ozay, control theorist
- Banu Onaral, Professor of Biomedical Engineering and Electrical Engineering at Drexel University
- Dost Öngür, Turkish-American psychiatrist and researcher
- Özalp Özer, Professor of Management Science at the University of Texas at Dallas
- İbrahim Tarık Özbolat, scientist and academic at the Pennsylvania State University
- Aydogan Ozcan, Professor of Electrical and Computer Engineering at University of California, Los Angeles
- Fatma Özcan, computer scientist
- Ümit Özkan, chemical engineer
- Mihri Özkan, Professor of Electrical and Computer Engineering at University of California, Riverside
- Meral Özsoyoglu, Professor Emeritus of Computer Science at Case Western Reserve University
- Asuman Özdağlar, professor at the Massachusetts Institute of Technology (MIT)
- Furkan Özturk,
- Hande Özdinler
- Burçin Mutlu-Pakdil, astronomer and astrophysicist at the University of Arizona
- Şevket Pamuk economics and he was the president of European Historical Economics Society
- Jacob L. Moreno, scientist
- Dani Rodrik, professor of International Political Economy at the John F. Kennedy School of Government at Harvard University
- Sema Salur, Professor of Mathematics at the University of Rochester
- Aziz Sancar, Professor of Biochemistry and Biophysics at the University of North Carolina School of Medicine
- Ezel Kural Shaw, historian and wife of Stanford J. Shaw
- Muzafer Sherif, Professor of Sociology at Pennsylvania State University
- Eshref Shevky, Professor of Sociology at the University of California
- Ergin Sezgin
- Oktay Sinanoğlu, youngest full Professor in Yale's 20th-century history
- Emin Gün Sirer, Associate Professor of Computer Science at Cornell University
- Nevzat Soguk, professor of political science at the University of Hawaiʻi at Mānoa,
- Halil Mete Soner, Professor of Financial Mathematics at ETH Zürich
- Tayfun Sönmez, Professor of Economics at Boston College
- Ayşegül Şahin, professor of Economics and Public Affairs at Princeton University
- Ayşe Şahin, chair of the Department of Mathematics and Statistics at Wright State University
- Damla Şentürk, Professor of biostatistics in the University of California
- Candan Tamerler, bioengineer and materials scientist
- Aysegul Timur, academic administrator who serves as the 5th president of Florida Gulf Coast University
- Serap Z. Tilav, US Antarctic Program field team member; the Tilav Cirque is named after her
- Mehmet Toner, Professor of surgery at the Harvard Medical School and Professor of biomedical engineering at the Harvard-MIT Division of Health Sciences and Technology
- Sefaattin Tongay, Professor of Materials Science and Engineering at Arizona State University
- Nafi Toksöz
- Zeynep Tufekci, Associate professor of Sociology at the University of North Carolina
- Dilek Hakkani-Tür, professor of computer science at the University of Illinois Urbana-Champaign
- Güneş Murat Tezcür professor of Political Science, is the Director of School of Politics and Global Studies at Arizona State University
- Kamil Ugurbil, physicist and biomedical imaging scientist known for his contributions to magnetic resonance imaging (MRI), functional magnetic resonance imaging (fMRI), and ultra-high-field human brain imaging
- Galip Ulsoy, Professor Emeritus of Mechanical Engineering and W.C. Ford Professor Emeritus of Manufacturing at University of Michigan
- Sennur Ulukus,
- Muzaffer Uysal, Professor in the Department of Hospitality and Tourism Management
- Mustafa Cenk Gursoy, Professor of electrical engineering and computer science at Syracuse University
- Turgay Üzer, Professor Emeritus at Georgia Institute of Technology
- Turhan Nejat Veziroğlu, is a professor emeritus at the University of Miami
- Vamık Volkan, Emeritus Professor of Psychiatry at the University of Virginia,
- Nur Yalman, Professor of Social Anthropology and Middle Eastern Studies at Harvard University
- Osman Yaşar, Professor and chair of the computational science department at State University of New York College at Brockport
- Nilay Yapici, neuroscientist at Cornell University
- Ece Yaprak, professor of engineering technology at Wayne State University
- Birsen Yazici, Turkish-American electrical engineer
- K. Aslıhan Yener, University of Chicago archaeologist who uncovered a new source of Bronze Age Anatolian tin mines
- Yaman Yener, Professor of Engineering at Northeastern University
- Aylin Yener, holds the Roy and Lois Chope Chair in engineering at Ohio State University
- Ahmet Yıldız, Associate Professor of Physics and Molecular Cell Biology at the University of California
- Bilge Yildiz, Professor of Nuclear Science, Materials Science and Engineering at the Massachusetts Institute of Technology
- Bilge Yılmaz, Wharton Private Equity Professor and Professor of Finance at the Wharton School
- Pınar Yoldaş, architect, artist and Professor at University of California San Diego
- Pinar Zorlutuna, professor of Bioengineering at the University of Notre Dame

== Activism ==
- Ayşenur Ezgi Eygi, Turkish-born American human rights activist and peer mentor
- Nonie Darwish, founder of Arabs for Israel
- Furkan Doğan, student, known for being killed in the 2010 Gaza flotilla raid

== American Civil War ==
- Marie Tepe, vivandière who fought for the Union army

== Architecture and design ==
- Kalef Alaton, interior designer
- Ayla Karacabey, architect

== Arts and literature ==
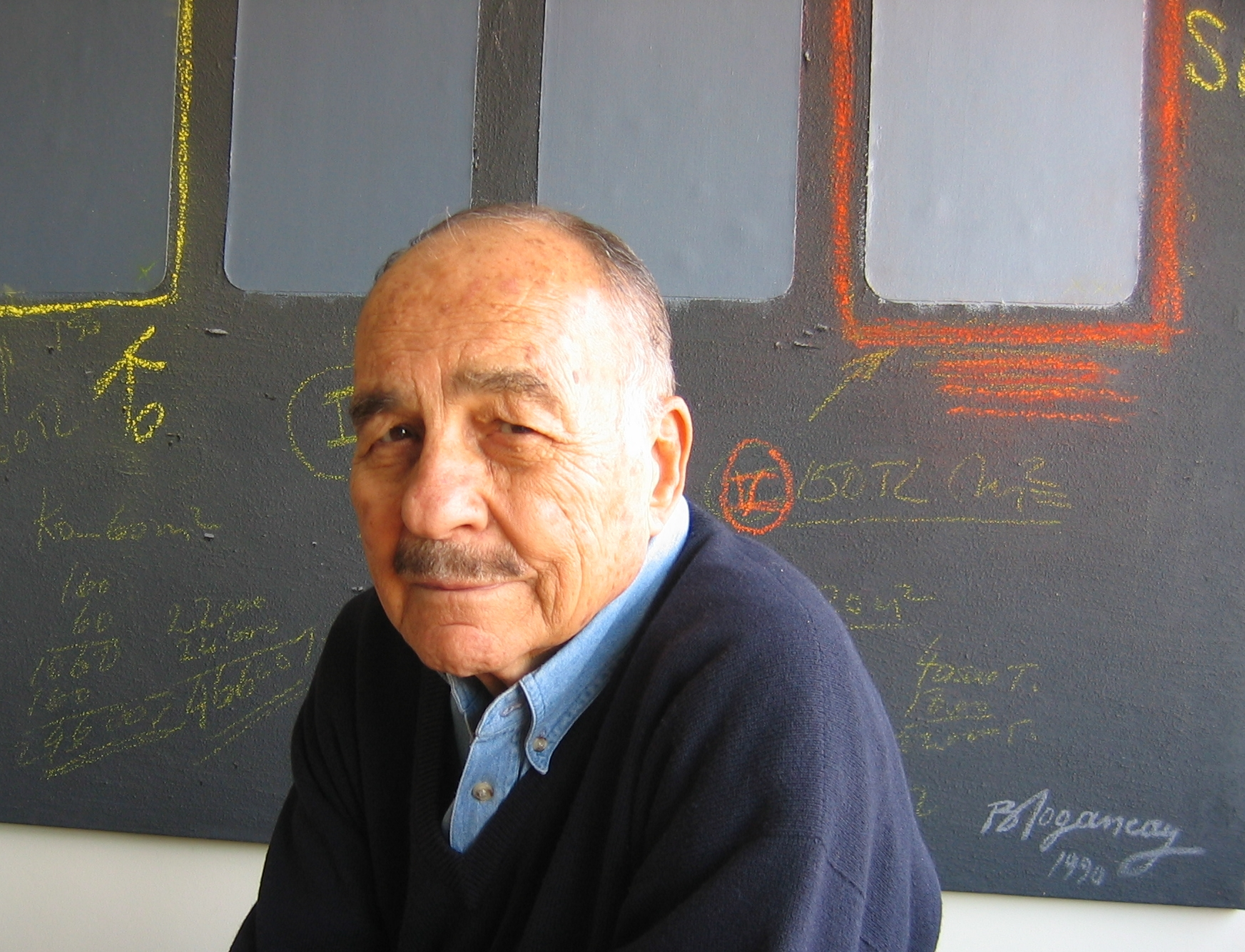
Burhan Doğançay

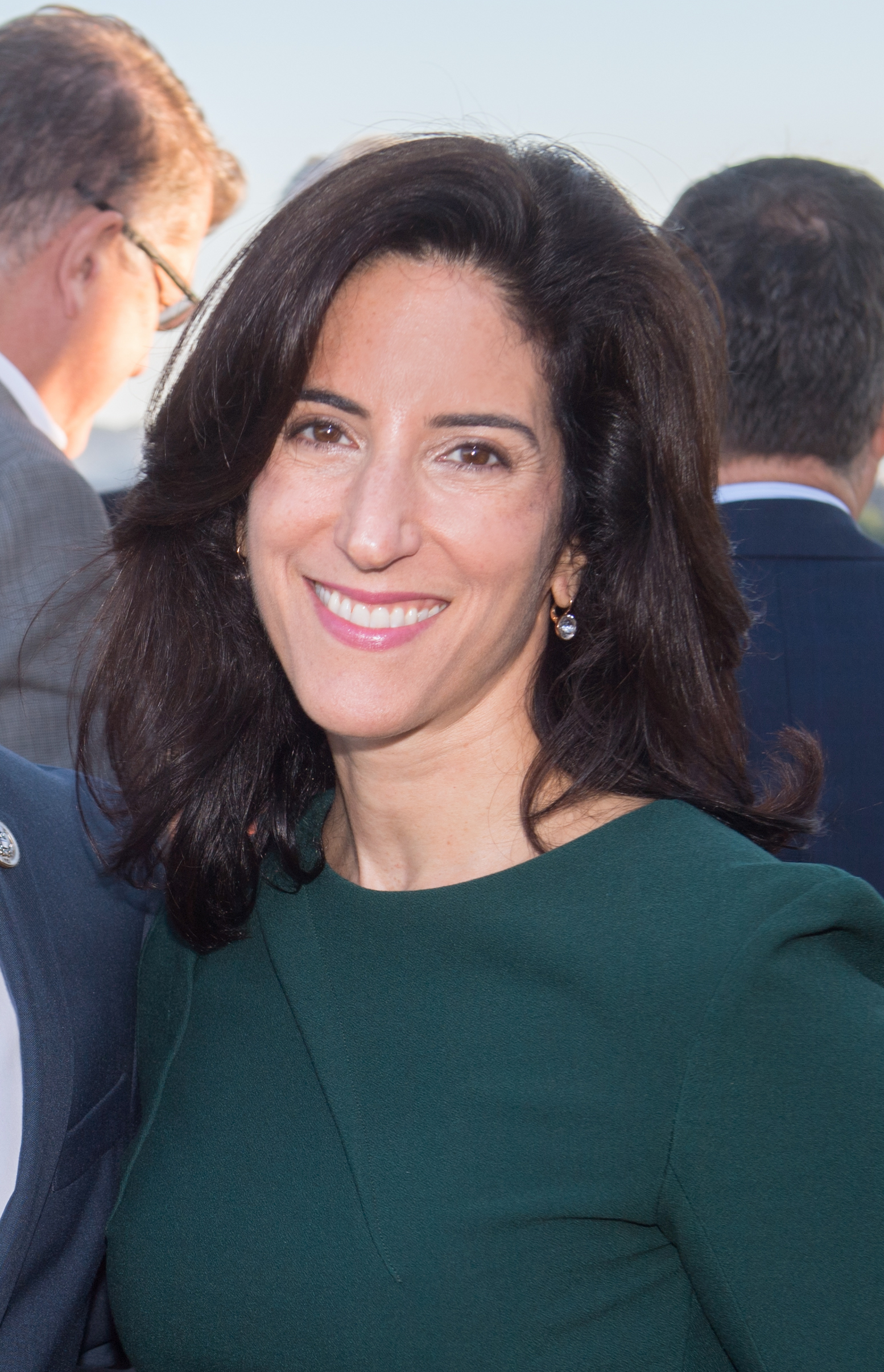
Rana Foroohar

- Mehemed Fehmy Agha, was a Russian-born Turkish designer, art director, and pioneer of modern American publishing.
- Etel Adnan, poet and visual artist
- Haluk Akakçe, artist
- Refik Anadol, media artist
- Atif Akin, artist and designer
- Arden Pala – author and philanthropist
- Nancy Atakan, visual artist
- Kutluğ Ataman, contemporary artist and filmmaker
- Sinem Banna, artist
- Elmira Bayrasli, educator and author
- Ayse Birsel, industrial designer and author
- Deniz Camp, comics writer
- Alev Croutier, writer
- Sevgi Çağal, painter and sculpture
- Adam Darius, dancer, mime artist, writer and choreographer
- Nerin E. Gun Journalist and survivor of Nazi concentration camps
- Burhan Doğançay, painter, photographer, and former soccer player
- Ipek Duben, contemporary visual artist
- Bilge Ebiri, New York Magazine film critic
- Selma Ekrem, writer
- Rana Foroohar, business columnist and an associate editor at the Financial Times
- Sururi Gümen, Illustrator and ghost artist behind Alfred Andriola's comic strip Kerry Drake
- Talât Sait Halman, he was a long-time member of the Poetry Society of America and a member of the Editorial Board of World Literature Today
- Ben Ali Haggin, portrait painter and stage designer
- Timothy Guy Kent, artist
- Jarett Kobek, author of the 2016 novel I Hate the Internet
- Reha Kutlu-Hutin, journalist, animal rights activist, and President of 30 millions d'amis
- Deniz Kuypers, writer
- LeRoy Neiman, artist known for his brilliantly colored, expressionist paintings and screenprints of athletes, musicians, and sporting events.
- Mustapha Osman, caricaturist, model maker and set designer
- Kenan Orhan, writer
- Hilde Limondjian, concert impresario
- Serkan Özkaya, conceptual artist
- Hayal Pozanti, artist
- Gizem Saka, contemporary artist
- Ali Sar, journalist
- Ozge Samanci, artist and Professor at Northwestern University
- Canan Tolon, artist
- Hakan Topal, artist and founder of Xurban collective
- Özel Türkbaş, belly dancer
- Doğan Uluç, journalist
- Ayse Wilson, artist
- Chantal Zakari, is an interdisciplinary artist
- Jihan Zencirli, visual artist

== Astronomy ==
- Betul Kacar, astrobiologist
- Janet Akyüz Mattei, astronomer and director of the AAVSO
- Feryal Özel, astrophysicist

== Business ==
- Bulent Altan, aerospace executive and venture capitalist; early leader of SpaceX

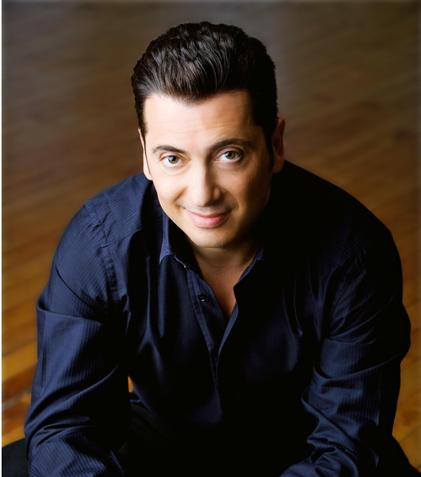
Melih Abdulhayoğlu

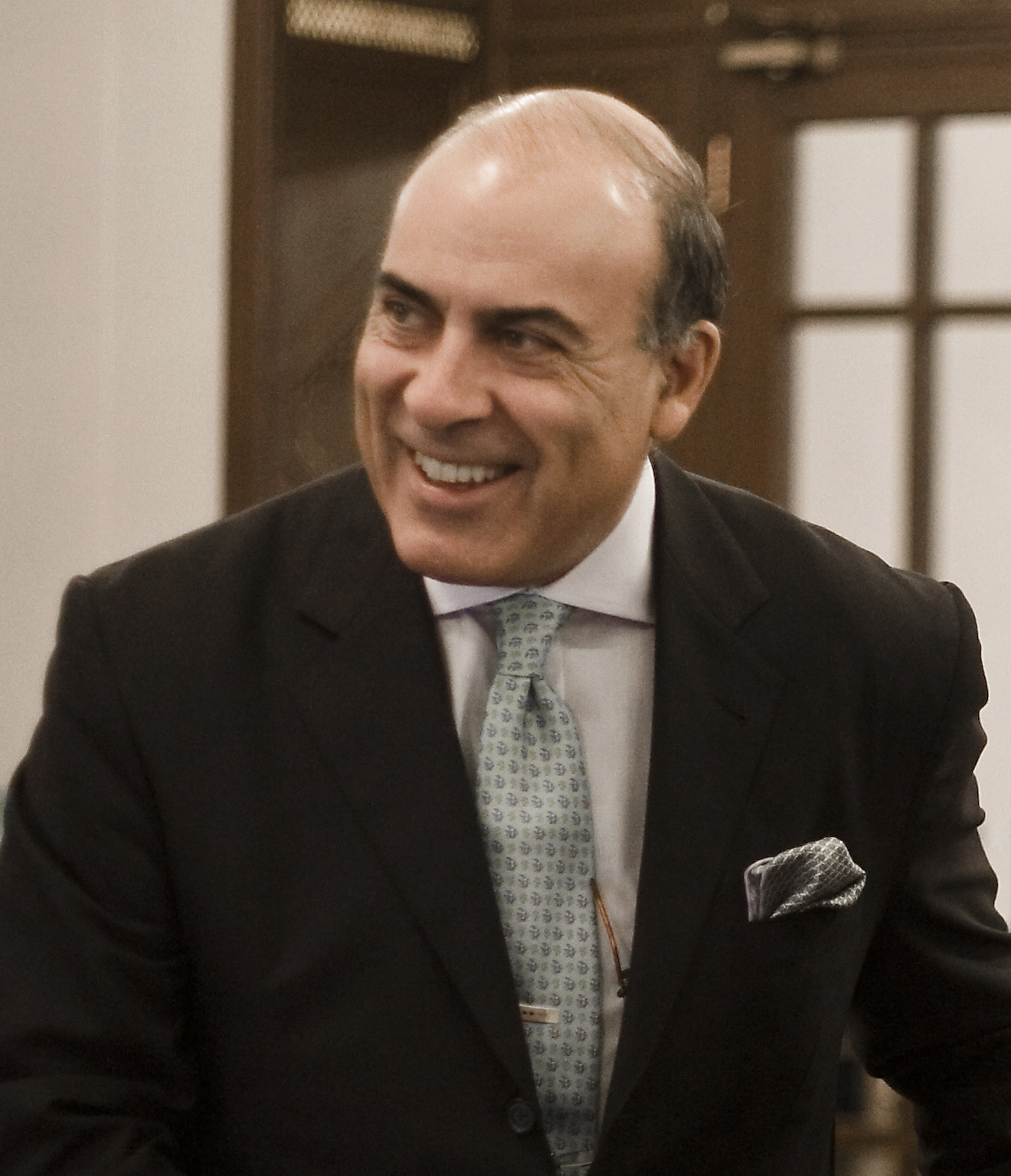
Muhtar Kent

- Melih Abdulhayoğlu, billionaire; founder, CEO, and president of Comodo Group
- Tevfik Arif, founder of the Bayrock Group
- Murat Aktihanoglu, venture capitalist
- Yalcin Ayasli, business executive
- Eren Bali, Founding CEO of Udemy and cofounder of Carbon Health
- Ahmet Bozer, business executive
- Süreyya Ciliv, former CEO of Turkcell
- Zach Erdem, television personality and entrepreneur
- Tugce Ergul, investor
- Hafize Gaye Erkan, was the former governor of the Central Bank of Turkey
- Hikmet Ersek, former CEO of Western Union
- James Ben Ali Haggin, investor and founder of the Ben Ali Stakes
- Osman Kibar, billionaire; founder and CEO of Samumed
- Koray Kavukcuoglu (SVP} of Google DeepMind
- Yalman Onaran, financial journalist
- John Olcay, financier
- Eren Ozmen, billionaire; co-owner and president of Sierra Nevada Corporation
- Fatih Ozmen, billionaire; co-owner of Sierra Nevada Corporation
- Cemil Ozyurt, founder of U.S.-based Turk of America
- Muhtar Kent, former CEO and chairman of The Coca-Cola Company
- Ergun Kirlikova,
- Nabila Khashoggi, businesswoman
- Murat Köprülü, investment professional and chairman of the American Turkish Society, and founder and chairman of the American Immigrant Society
- Richard Lounsbery, businessman and founder of the Richard Lounsbery Foundation
- Erol Onaran, founder of Erol's
- Ahmet Mücahid Ören, CEO of İhlas Holding
- Sadettin Saran, businessman
- Mike Sarimsakci, businessman
- Izak Senbahar, entrepreneur, hotelier and real estate developer
- Aydin Senkut, American investor and tech executive
- Metin Sitti, co-founder of Setex Technologies Inc. based in Pittsburgh, USA.
- Leila Steinberg, business woman and the first manager of rapper Tupac Shakur (Mexican-Turkish mother)
- Kenan Şahin, establishing partner in Lucent Technologies
- Altina Schinasi, inventor of Cat eye glasses
- Joe Ucuzoglu is a businessman and Global CEO of Deloitte
- Hamdi Ulukaya is a Turkish billionaire businessman
- Arda Ural,
- Vim Wright, American entrepreneur, academic, political activist, and environmentalist.

== Cinema and television ==
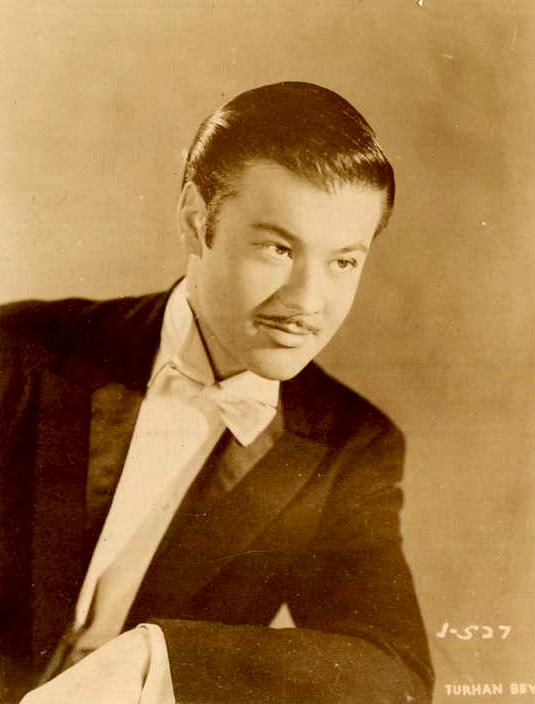
Turhan Bey

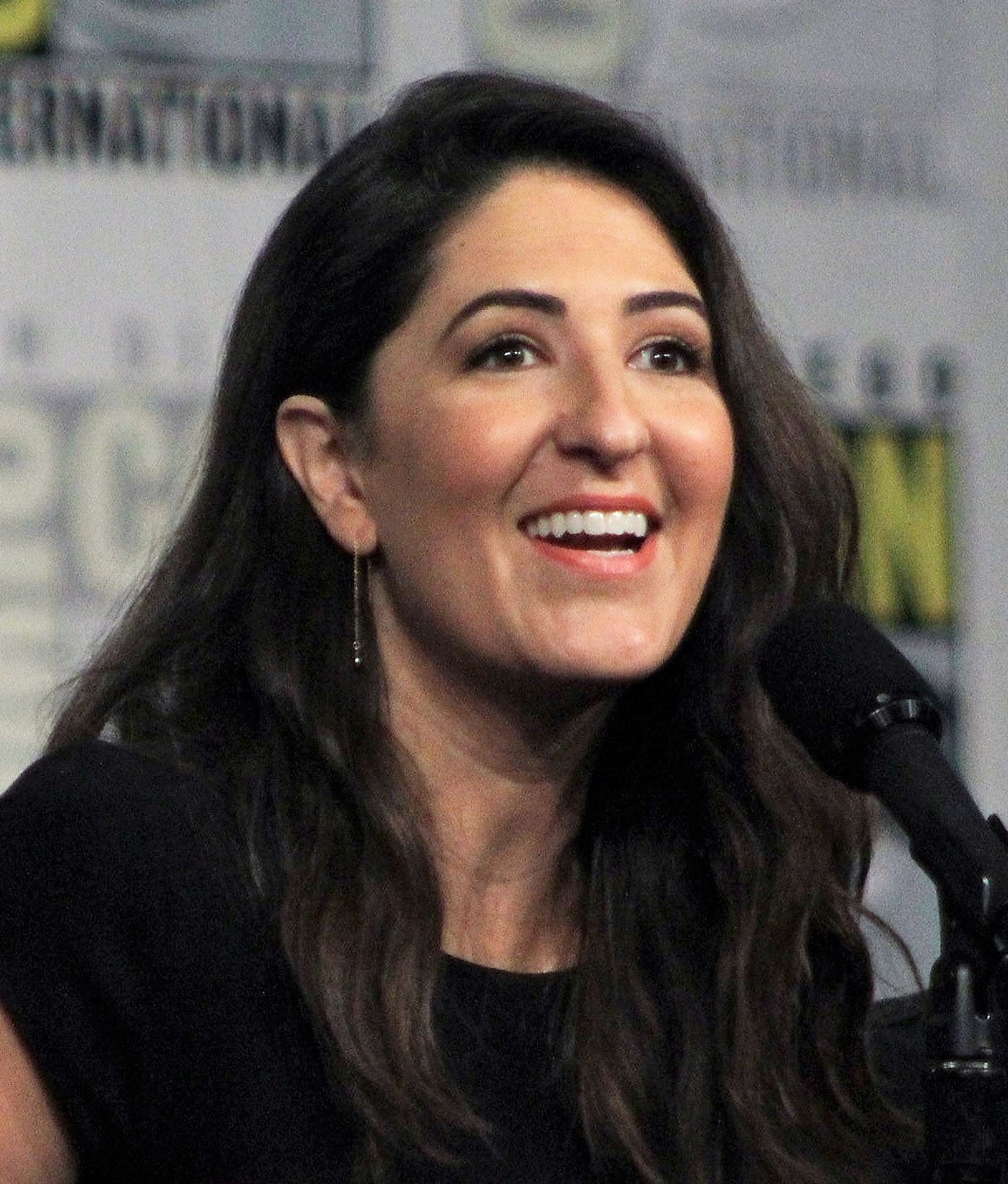
D'Arcy Carden

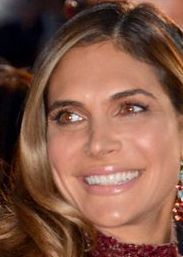
Ayda Field

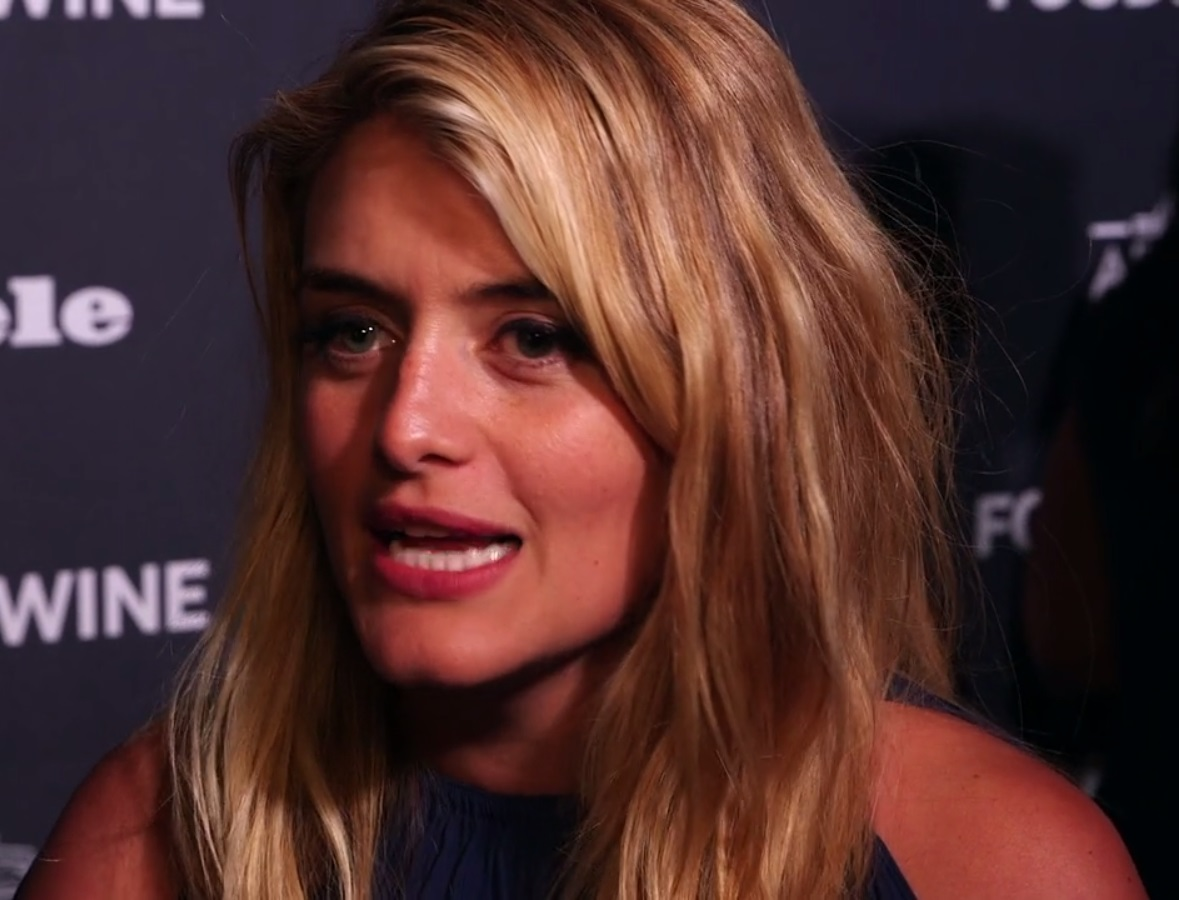
Daphne Oz

- Alev Aydin screenwriter and former husband of Halsey (singer)
- Derya Arbaş, actress
- Aclan Bates, director
- Bea Benaderet, American actress and comedienne
- Turhan Bey, 1940s and 1950s film star
- D'Arcy Carden, actress
- Jason Davis, voice actor
- Bilge Ebiri, journalist and filmmaker
- Tarik Ergin, actor
- Didem Erol, actress
- Ayda Field, actress, married to British singer-songwriter Robbie Williams
- Defne Joy Foster, actress
- Murat Han, actor
- Cihan Kaan, musician, filmmaker and author
- Kaan Kalyon, co-writer of Disney's Pocahontas (1995) and Hercules (1997)
- Erin Kaplan, television and fashion media personality
- Zachary Laoutides, actor, screenwriter and filmmaker
- Shevaun Mizrahi, filmmaker
- Sam Morril, stand-up comedian
- Larry Namer is best known as the founder of E! Entertainment TV
- Erol Onaran, founder of Erol's TV, Erol's Video and Erol's Internet
- Eren Özker, puppeteer on The Muppet Show
- Daphne Oz, nutrition author and television host
- Hal Ozsan, actor
- Irma St. Paule, actress
- Ayse Romey, actress
- Ozman Sirgood, actor
- Emre Sahin, film and television director
- Tiffani Thiessen, actress
- Louie Torrellas, actor and comedian
- Onur Tukel, actor, painter, and filmmaker
- Lev Yilmaz, filmmaker
- Emrah Yucel, graphic artist for Hollywood movie posters

== Early Turkish settlers to the US ==
- Ibrahim Ben Ali, Ottoman Turkish soldier and physician who arrived in the US in the late 1790s

== Fashion design and modelling ==
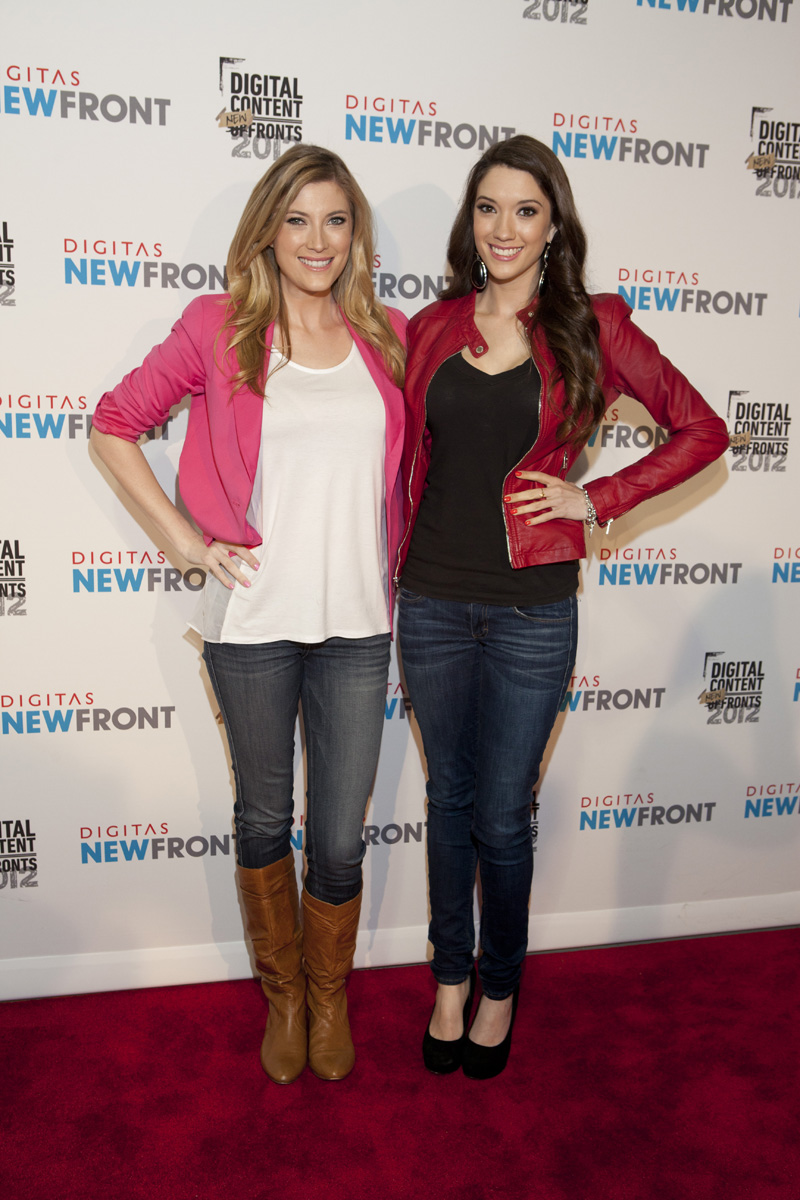
Elle and Blair Fowler

- John Gidding, fashion model
- Elle Fowler, beauty and style-related YouTuber
- Blair Fowler, beauty and style-related YouTuber
- Melissa Odabash, fashion designer
- Dee Ocleppo, fashion designer
- Özel Türkbaş, Turkish-born actress, model, singer and belly dancer

== House of Osman ==
- Ertuğrul Osman, 43rd Head of the Imperial House of Osman

== Law ==
- Ozan Varol, author and was a tenured law professor
- Halil Süleyman Özerden, United States District Judge for the Southern District of Mississippi

== Medicine ==
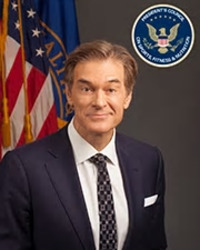
Mehmet Oz

- Fikri Alican, surgeon and medical doctor
- Münci Kalayoğlu, surgeon
- Zeynel A. Karcıoğlu, M.D., ophthalmic oncology and orbital diseases specialist, surgeon
- Behram Kurşunoğlu, physicist, co-founder of the Center for Theoretical Studies, University of Miami
- Tamer Seckin, founder of Endometriosis Foundation of America
- H. Nida Sen, clinical investigator at the National Eye Institute
- Mehmet Öz, cardiothoracic surgeon, formerly host of The Dr. Oz Show

== Music ==
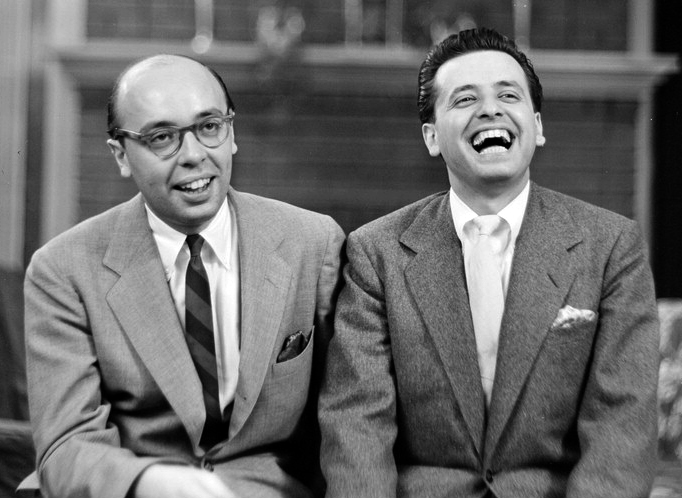
Ahmet Ertegün and Nesuhi Ertegün

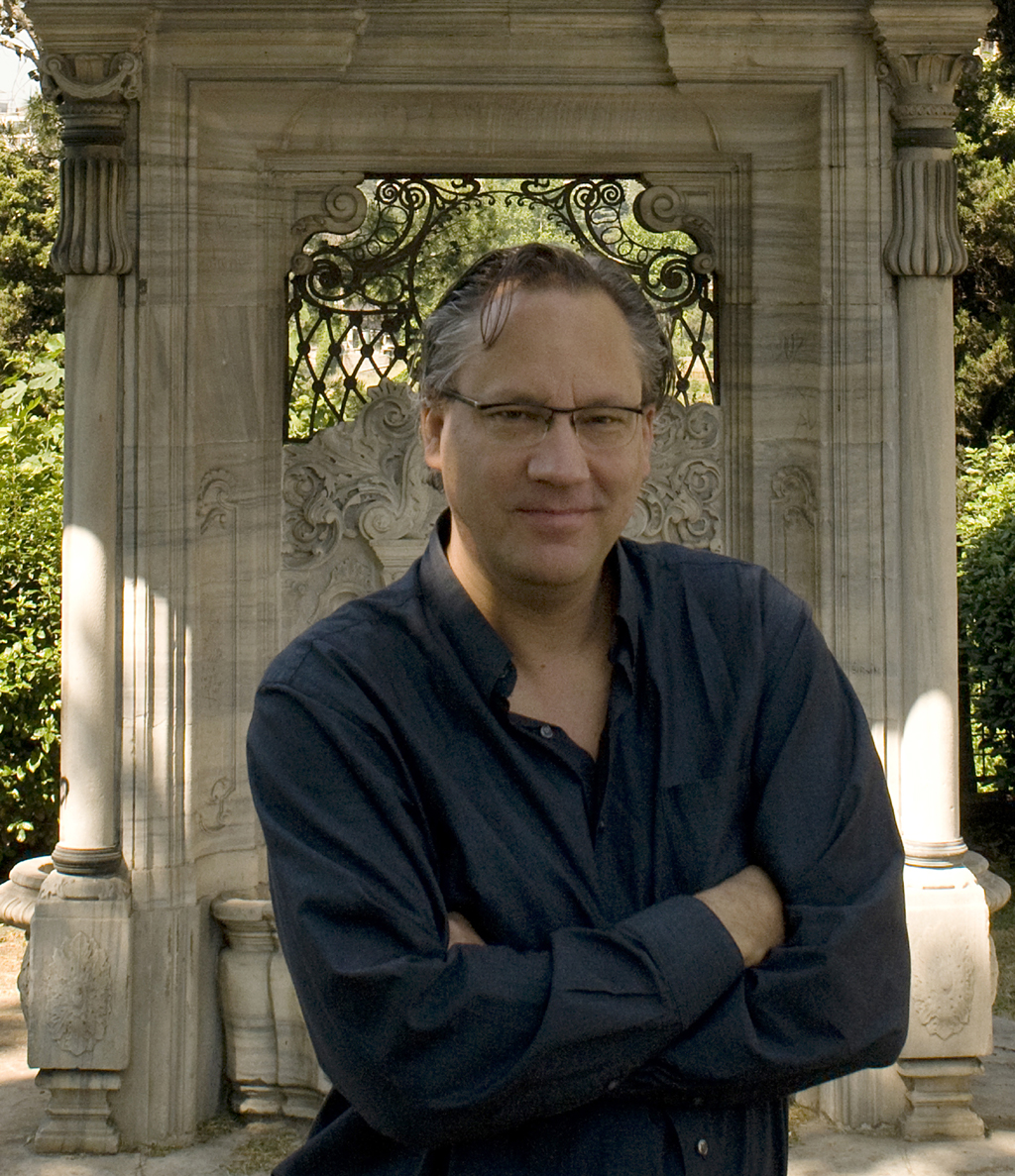
Kamran Ince

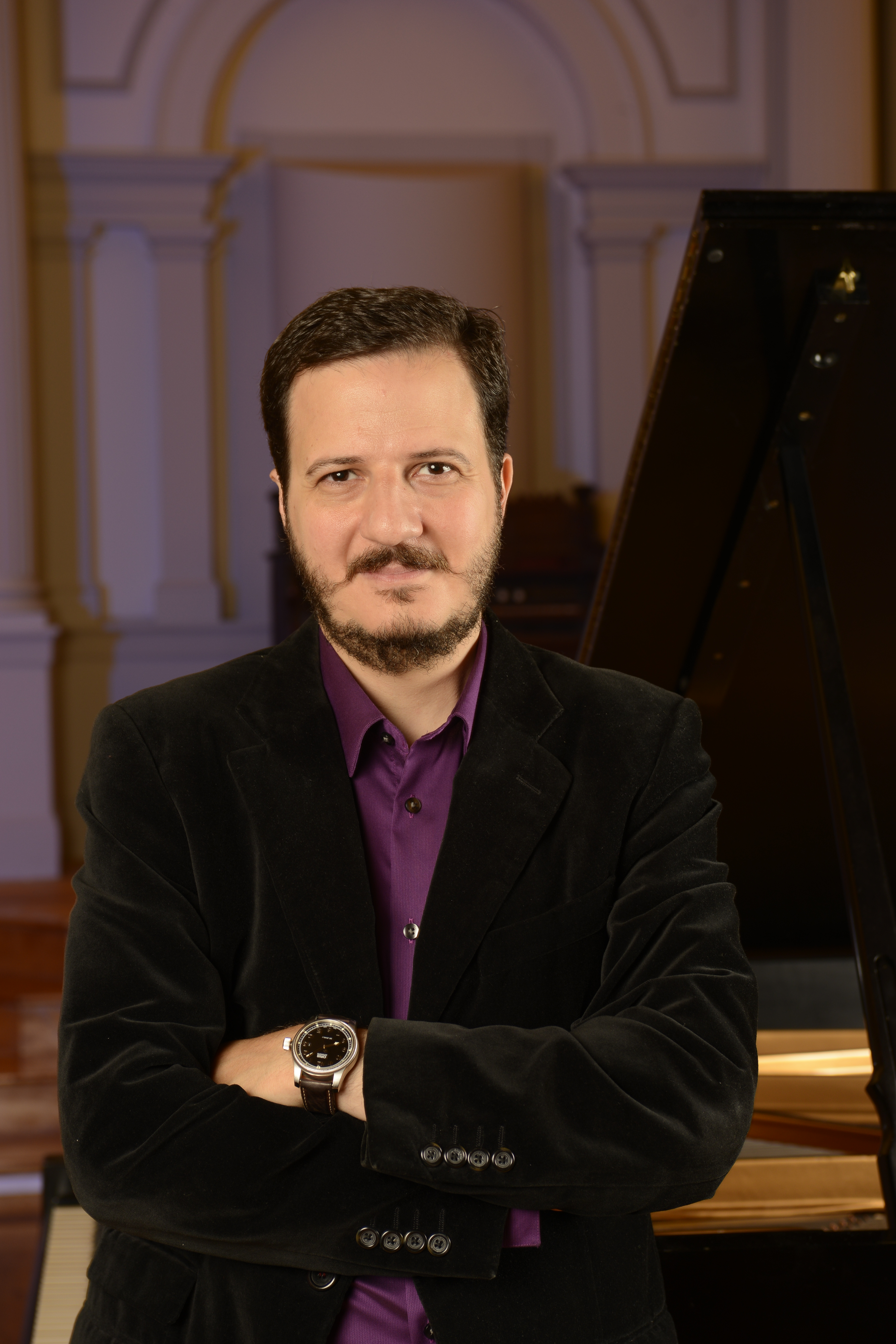
Mehmet Ali Sanlıkol

- Fahir Atakoğlu, pianist
- Bülent Arel, composer of contemporary classical music and electronic music
- Kathy Barr, singer
- Evren Celimli, composer and producer of music for modern dance, theater, film and the concert hall
- Bob Dylan, singer
- Atilla Engin, fusion jazz drummer
- Ahmet Ertegün, founder of Atlantic Records, chairman of the Rock and Roll Hall of Fame and Museum, and co-founder of the New York Cosmos soccer team of the North American Soccer League
- Nesuhi Ertegün, record producer and executive of Atlantic Records
- Oak Felder, songwriter and record producer
- Selim Giray, violinist
- Eydie Gormé, singer
- Isaac Guillory, folk guitarist
- Kamran İnce, composer
- Inji (singer)
- Emir Işılay, composer and pianist
- Tolga Katas, singer-songwriter, and record producer
- Arif Mardin, Vice President and general manager of Manhattan Records
- Joe Mardin, music producer and son of Arif Mardin
- İlhan Mimaroğlu, musician and electronic music composer; founder of Finnadar Records
- Mehmet Ali Sanlıkol, Grammy nominated composer
- Neil Sedaka, pop singer-songwriter, pianist
- Batu Sener, composer
- Deniz Tek, founding member of Australian rock group Radio Birdman
- Özlem Tekin, singer
- Ömer Faruk Tekbilek, Turkish musician and composer
- Pınar Toprak, composer
- Rosalyn Tureck, was a Turkish American pianist and harpsichordist and was among the founders of the Music Academy of the West
- Mutlu Onaral, is an American Soul singer
- Jane Remover, experimental musician and rapper, Turkish Cypriot father

== NASA ==
- Ismail Akbay, served in various managerial capacities during NASA's Apollo, Skylab and Apollo–Soyuz projects
- Deniz Burnham, lieutenant in the United States Navy Reserve and NASA astronaut candidate
- Serkan Golge, NASA contractor on NASA's proposed human mission to Mars

== Politics ==
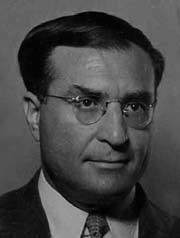
Kasım Gülek

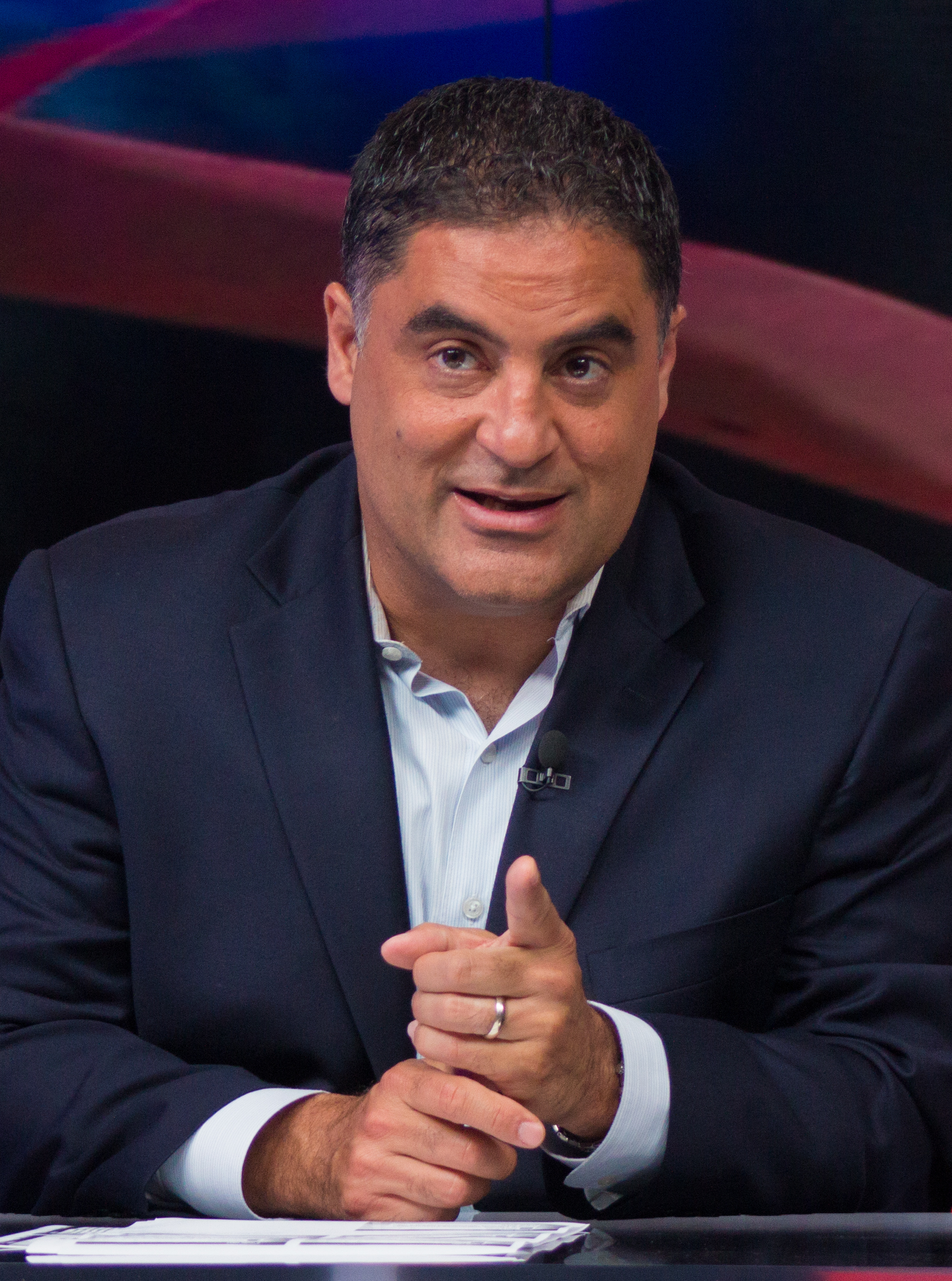
Cenk Uygur

- Zeyno Baran, scholar on issues on US-Turkey relations
- Selin Sayek Böke, member of the Republican People's Party (CHP) in Turkey
- Osman "Oz" Bengür, Maryland Democratic Party Congressional candidate
- Naz Durakoğlu, Assistant Secretary of State for Legislative Affairs
- Kasım Gülek was a prominent turkish statesman
- Merve Kavakçı, turkish ambassador to Malaysia
- Steve Cohen (politician) American attorney and politician.
- Hasan Piker, Twitch streamer and political commentator
- Cenk Uygur, host of The Young Turks and candidate for California's 25th congressional district in 2020
- Halil Mutlu, Physician at Baystate Medical Center, first cousin of President Recep Tayyip Erdoğan, and Chairman of AK Party USA

== Religion ==
- Abdul Kerim al-Qubrusi, former representative of the Naqshbandi-Haqqani Order in the United States
- Yusuf Ziya Kavakçı, Islamic cleric

== Sports ==
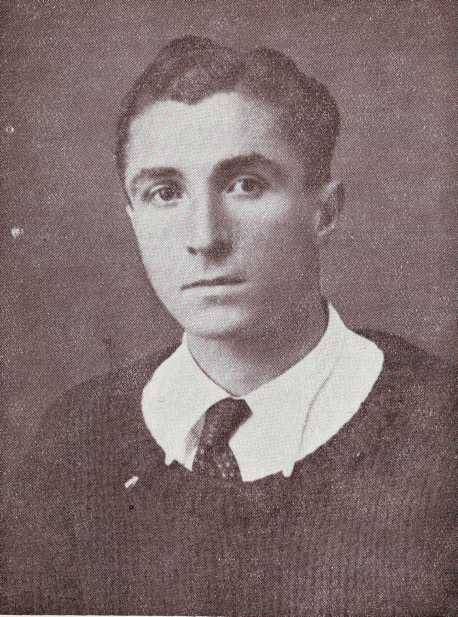
Haydar Aşan

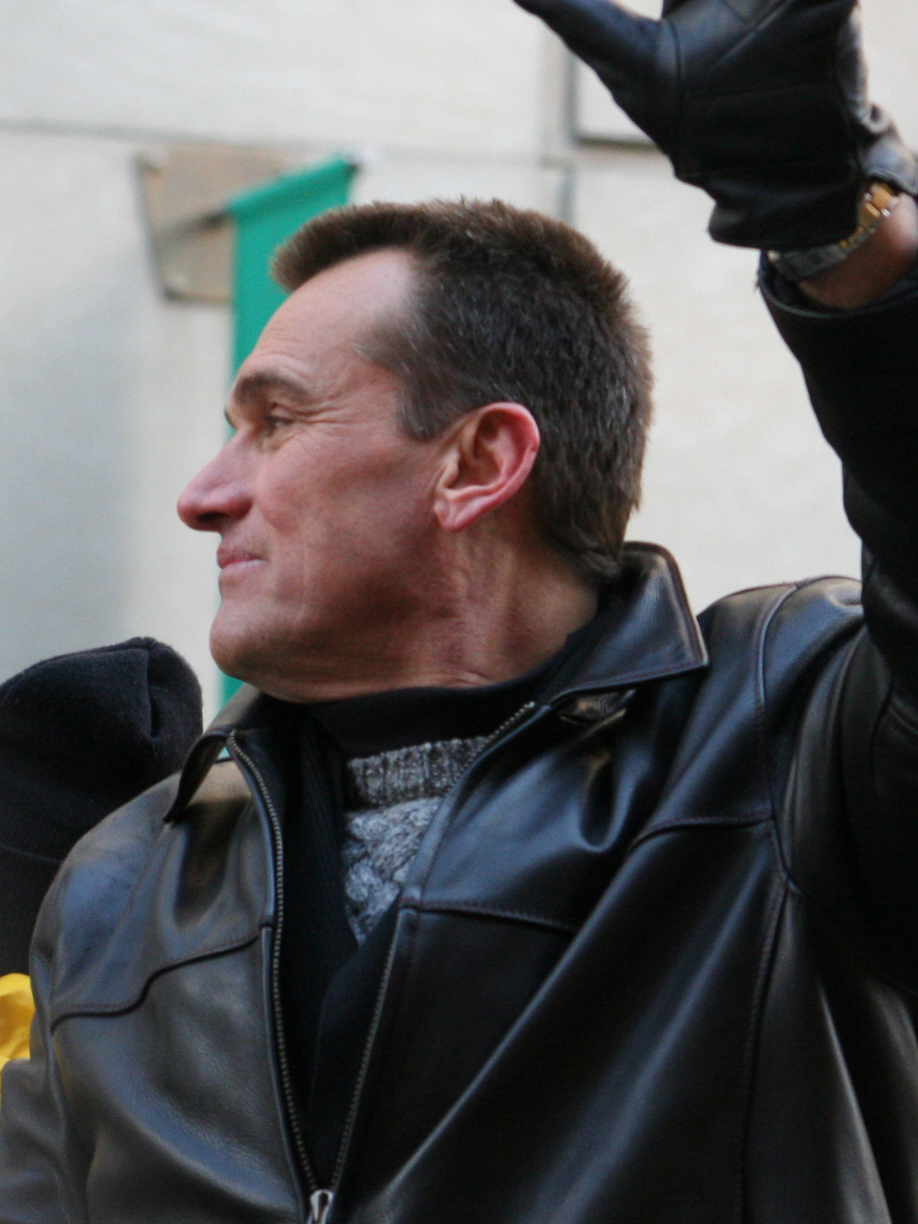
Tunch Ilkin

- Ayla Aksu, tennis player
- Haydar Aşan, sprinter
- Bora Aydınlık, football player
- Madame Bey and Sidki Bey was an American boxing trainers. they ran a boxing camp for world champion boxers.
- Chris Başak, Major League Baseball infielder
- Hilmi Esat Bayındırlı, Paralympic alpine skier
- Deniz Bozkurt, plays for the Puerto Rico national football team
- Kasim Edebali, American football player
- Korel Engin, basketball player
- Erden Eruç, completed first solo human-powered circumnavigation of the Earth by rowboat, sea kayak, bicycle and foot
- Yusuf İsmail professional wrestler
- Tunç İlkin, former Pittsburgh Steelers player and sports commentator
- Enes Kanter Freedom, basketball player
- Alev Kelter, American rugby sevens and rugby union player
- Şebnem Kimyacıoğlu, basketball player
- Yasemin Kimyacıoğlu, basketball player
- Derya Büyükuncu, swimmer
- Abdurrahim Kuzu, wrestler
- Mehmet Okur, Utah Jazz player and 2007 NBA All-Star
- Yılmaz Orhan, football player
- Alp Ozkilic, mixed martial artist
- Renan Ozturk, rock climber
- Peri Suzan Özkum, diver
- William Haggin Perry, horseracer
- Nevin Nevlin, basketball player
- Ugur Taner, swimmer
- Ferdi Taygan, tennis player
- Tansel Turgut, chess player who earned the title of International Correspondence Chess Grandmaster in 2007
- Jonny Vandal, professional wrestler
- Nevriye Yılmaz, basketball player

== Other ==
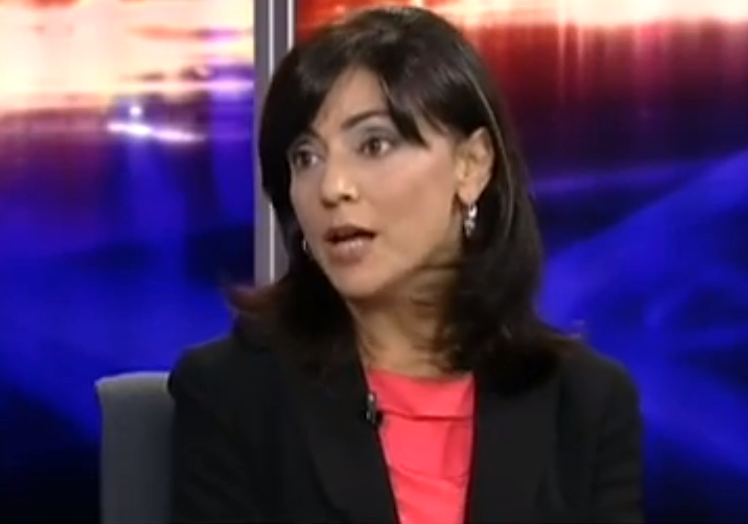
Sibel Edmonds

- Hakki Akdeniz, American restaurateur
- Hungry Ghost Coffee, was founded in Brooklyn by Murat Uyaroglu
- Dina Al-Sabah, professional figure competitor
- Sema Sgaier, is a scientist, global health expert
- Zeyno Baran, Director of the Center for Eurasian Policy
- Orkut Büyükkökten, software engineer
- Birol Emir, Turkish-American statistician
- Erden Eruç, is a Turkish-American adventurer
- Tantek Çelik, computer scientist
- Tarik (gamer)
- Kemal Derviş, Turkish economist and politician
- Brittanee Drexel, woman missing since 2009
- Sibel Deniz Edmonds, former FBI translator
- Pinar Oya Yilmaz, geologist
- Hasan Özbekhan, systems scientist, cyberneticist, philosopher
- Hüseyin Şehitoğlu, mechanical engineer

== See also ==
- Turkic American
- List of Turkish people
- List of Turkish Canadians
- List of Turkish Belgians
- List of British Turks
- List of Dutch people of Turkish descent
- List of Turkish French people
- List of Turkish Germans
- Azerbaijani-Americans
- Turkish-Cypriot
