= Şennur =

Şennur is a Turkish feminine given name. It may refer to:

- Şennur Demir (born 1982), Turkish boxer and coach
- Sennur Sezer (1943–2015), Turkish poet and documentary writer.
- Sennur Ulukus, American engineer of Turkish descent
