= Ozlem Goker-Alpan =

American physician-scientist

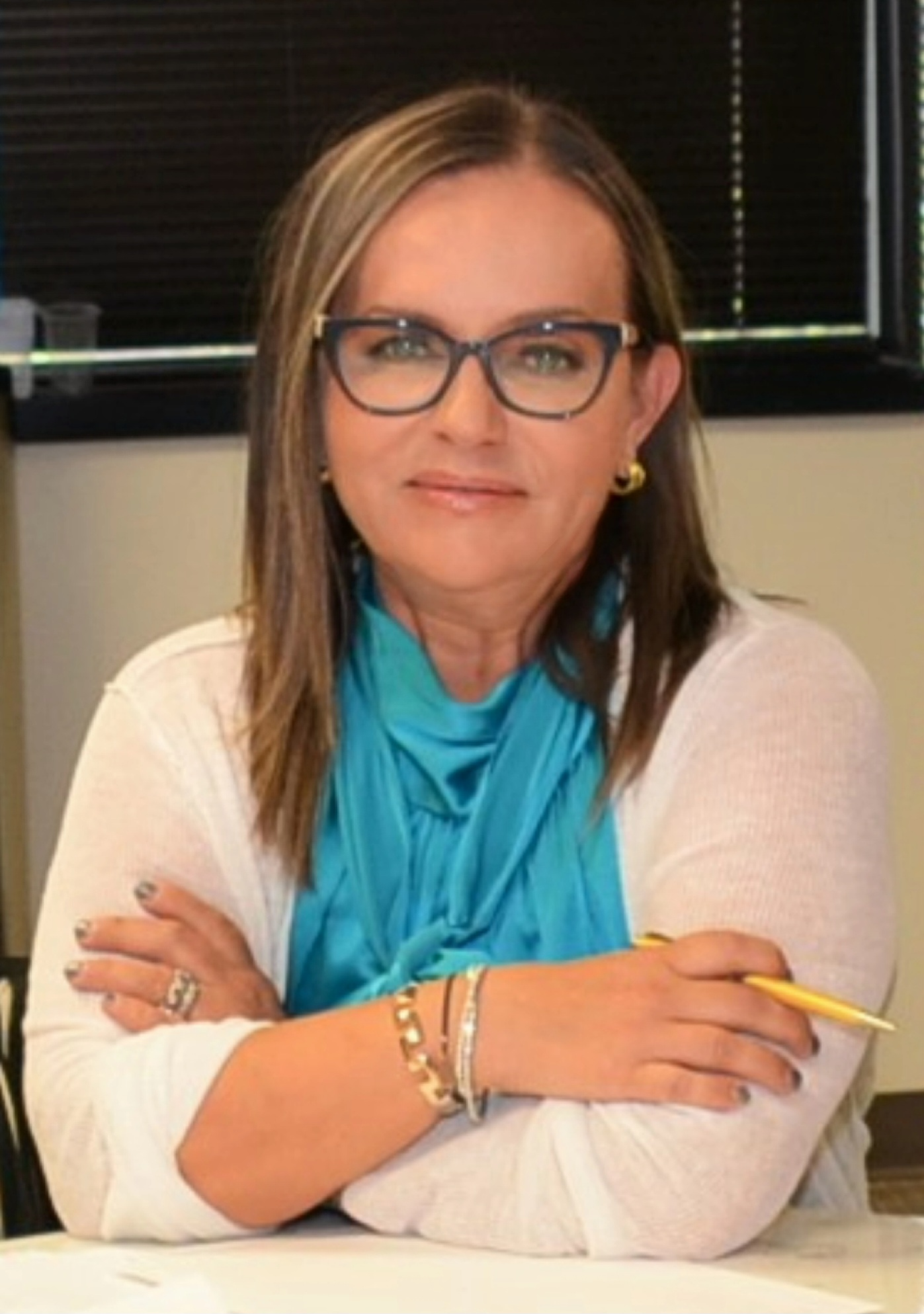
- Born: 1966 (age 59–60)
- Title: Founder and Chief Medical Officer, Lysosomal and Rare Disorders Research and Treatment Center (LDRTC)

Education and training
- 1984–1990: Marmara University School of Medicine (M.D.), Istanbul, Turkey
- 1992–1996: SUNY at Stony Brook, Pediatrics, Stony Brook, New York
- 1996–1999: Greater Washington Medical Genetics Fellowship Program (NIH), Bethesda, Maryland

Ozlem Goker-Alpan is a Turkish-American physician-scientist whose work focuses on lysosomal storage disorders and rare genetic diseases. She is the founder and chief medical officer of the Lysosomal and Rare Disorders Research and Treatment Center (LDRTC), a nonprofit organization based in Fairfax, Virginia.

== Early life ==
Goker-Alpan was born and raised in Istanbul, Turkey.

== Education and training ==
Goker-Alpan received her medical degree from Marmara University in Istanbul, Turkey. She later completed pediatrics training in the United States and pursued fellowship training in clinical and biochemical genetics at the National Institutes of Health (NIH) through the Greater Washington Medical Genetics program.

== Career ==
Goker-Alpan has worked in clinical and translational research related to lysosomal disorders, including Gaucher's disease and neurologic manifestations associated with variants in the GBA gene. She is associated with the Lysosomal and Rare Disorders Research and Treatment Center (LDRTC), which integrates clinical care and research programs in rare diseases.

== Selected publications ==
- Goker-Alpan O, et al. “Glucocerebrosidase is present in α-synuclein inclusions in Lewy body disorders.” Acta Neuropathologica (2010).
- Weinreb NJ; Goker-Alpan O. “Ambroxol as Therapy for Gaucher Disease—Ambitious but Ambivalent.” JAMA Network Open (2023).
