= Muzaffer Uysal =

Turkish-American tourism scholar

- Known for: Tourism demand and supply; destination management; tourism marketing; quality-of-life research in tourism and hospitality
- Awards: Clarivate Highly Cited Researcher (2021–2026)

Academic background
- Education: Texas A&M University (Ph.D.); University of New Haven (MBA); Ankara İktisadi ve Ticari İlimler Akademisi (Gazi University) (B.S.)

Academic work
- Institutions: University of Massachusetts Amherst; Virginia Tech; University of South Carolina; North-West University (South Africa)

Muzaffer (Muzzo) Uysal is the Carney Family Endowed Professor in the Department of Hospitality and Tourism Management at the Isenberg School of Management, University of Massachusetts Amherst, where he also holds the title of Provost Professor. He is an elected Fellow and President of the International Academy for the Study of Tourism and a member of the Academy of Leisure Sciences. For five consecutive years (2021–2026), Clarivate has named him among the world's most highly cited social science researchers (top one per cent by citations for his field). His published work has been cited over 58,000 times on Google Scholar.

== Education ==
Uysal earned a bachelor's degree in business administration and accounting from Ankara İktisadi ve Ticari İlimler Akademisi (Gazi University) in Ankara, Turkey (1977), an MBA from the University of New Haven (1982), and a Ph.D. from Texas A&M University (1984).

== Career ==
Uysal has served on the faculty of the Department of Hospitality and Tourism Management at Virginia Tech's Pamplin College of Business and as Associate Dean for Research and Graduate Programs at the University of South Carolina's College of Hospitality, Retail, and Sport Management. He joined the University of Massachusetts Amherst in 2016 as Department Chair of Hospitality and Tourism Management, a role he held for seven years. He is the Carney Family Endowed Professor of Hospitality and Tourism Management at the Isenberg School of Management and holds the title of Provost Professor.

He served for three years as Extra Ordinary Professor at North-West University in South Africa.

== Research ==
Uysal's research has moved from tourism demand and consumer behavior toward tourism development, destination management, quality of life, and well-being. His scholarship examines tourism as a vehicle for human well-being, resident quality of life, tourist experiences, and destination sustainability. More recent work adopts a human-centered perspective, focusing on how tourism can contribute to the well-being of people, communities, destinations, and the environment.

His work on quality-of-life research in tourism, including the article "Quality of life (QOL) and well-being research in tourism" (Tourism Management, 2016), has been cited in establishing connections between tourism experiences and the well-being of tourists and host-community residents.

== Leadership and professional service ==
Uysal is an elected Fellow and President of the International Academy for the Study of Tourism. He is a member of the Academy of Leisure Sciences. He has served on the board of the Management Institute for Quality-of-Life Studies (MIQOLS) and the National Tour Foundation's Education Advisory Council.

== Awards and recognition ==
- Clarivate Highly Cited Researcher for five consecutive years (2021–2026), placing his work in the top one per cent by citations for his field worldwide.
- Named among the world's top 2% most-cited scientists (Stanford University / Elsevier ranking).

== Selected publications ==
Uysal is the author or co-author of sixteen books and numerous journal articles. Selected publications include:

- Uysal, M., Berbekova, A., & Wang, J. (2025). Quality-of-life: A critical examination of research progress. Tourism Management, 107, 105070.
- Uysal, M., & Sirgy, M.J. (Eds.). (2023). The Handbook of Tourism and Quality-of-Life Research II: Enhancing the Lives of Tourists and Residents of Host Communities. Springer.
- Berbekova, A., Uysal, M., & Assaf, A.G. (2021). A thematic analysis of crisis management in tourism: A theoretical perspective. Tourism Management, 86, 104342.
- Berbekova, A., & Uysal, M. (2021). Wellbeing and quality of life in tourism. In J. Wilks, D. Pendergast, P.A. Leggat, & D. Morgan (Eds.), Tourist Health, Safety and Wellbeing in the New Normal (pp. 243–268). Springer.
- Uysal, M., Berbekova, A., & Kim, H. (2020). Designing for Quality of Life. Annals of Tourism Research, 83.
- Uysal, M., & Sirgy, M.J. (2019). Quality-of-Life Indicators as Performance Measures in Tourism and Hospitality. Annals of Tourism Research, 76, 291–300.
- Uysal, M. (2019). Measuring tourism success–alternative outcome variables: a perspective article. Tourism Review.
- Kim, H., Sirgy, M.J., & Uysal, M. (2018). Seniors: Quality of Life and Travel and Tourism. In Best Practices in Hospitality and Tourism Marketing and Management: A Quality-of-Life Perspective (pp. 241–253). Springer.
- Sirgy, M.J., Uysal, M., & Kruger, S. (2017). Towards a benefits theory of leisure well-being. Applied Research in Quality of Life, 12(1), 205–228.
- Uysal, M., Sirgy, M.J., Woo, E., & Kim, H.L. (2016). Quality of life (QOL) and well-being research in tourism. Tourism Management, 53, 244–261.
- Yolal, M., Gursoy, D., Uysal, M., Kim, H.L., & Karacaoğlu, S. (2016). Impacts of festivals and events on residents' well-being. Annals of Tourism Research, 61, 1–18.
- Kim, H., Woo, E., & Uysal, M. (2015). Tourism experience and quality of life among elderly tourists. Tourism Management, 46, 465–476.
- Woo, E., Kim, H., & Uysal, M. (2015). Life satisfaction and support for tourism development. Annals of Tourism Research, 50, 84–97.
- Kim, K., Uysal, M., & Sirgy, M.J. (2013). How does tourism in a community impact the quality of life of community residents? Tourism Management, 36, 527–540.
- Uysal, M., Perdue, R., & Sirgy, M.J. (Eds.). (2012). Handbook of Tourism and Quality-of-Life Research: Enhancing the Lives of Tourists and Residents of Host Communities. Springer.
- Yoon, Y., & Uysal, M. (2005). An examination of the effects of motivation and satisfaction on destination loyalty: a structural model. Tourism Management, 26(1), 45–56.
- Uysal, M., & Jurowski, C. (1994). Testing the push and pull factors. Annals of Tourism Research, 21(4), 844–846.
