= Hilde Limondjian =

Turkish American concert impresario (1936-2026)

Hilde Limondjian (1936 – 2026) was a Turkish American concert impresario. She was born in Istanbul, and at the age of 9 came to the United States with her mother and sister to reunite with her father, after the end of World War II. The family settled in Forest Hills, Queens. She graduated from Barnard College with a B.A. in art history (1958). She also was a trained classical pianist.

She was hired by Thomas Hoving and was the General Manager of Concerts and Lectures for the Metropolitan Museum of Art from 1969 to 2010.
