= İbrahim Tarık Özbolat =

Ibrahim Tarik Ozbolat
- Born: Adana, Turkey
- Education: Middle East Technical University (BS); University at Buffalo (PhD)
- Awards: FAME Jr Award (2015); Institute of Industrial Engineers Hamed K. Eldin Outstanding Early Career IE in Academia Award (2015); Pi Tau Sigma Gold Medal (2014); ASME Chao and Trigger Young Manufacturing Engineer Award (2014); National Science Foundation CAREER (2014); SME Outstanding Young Manufacturing Engineer Award (2014)
- Scientific career
- Fields: Bioprinting; Biomanufacturing; Tissue Engineering
- Workplaces: Penn State University

Prof. İbrahim Tarık Özbolat is a Turkish scientist and academic at the Pennsylvania State University (State College, United States). He specializes in manufacturing and tissue engineering, with numerous articles published in the context of bioprinting. He received his Ph.D. in Industrial and Systems Engineering from University at Buffalo, The State University of New York, New York, and dual B.S. degrees in Mechanical Engineering and in Industrial Engineering from Middle East Technical University Ankara, Turkey. He is the principal investigator for the Ozbolat Lab in the Millennium Science Complex at the Huck Institute of the Life Sciences.

== Books ==
- 3D Bioprinting: Fundamentals, Principles and Applications
- 3D Bioprinting in Tissue and Organ Regeneration
