= Burcin Becerik-Gerber =

Turkish American engineering educator

- Education: Harvard University; University of California at Berkeley; Istanbul Technical University
- Scientific career
- Workplaces: University of Southern California

Burcin Becerik-Gerber is a Turkish American engineering educator and Professor in the Sonny Astani Department of Civil and Environmental Engineering at the University of Southern California. She is known for her work in human-building interaction, a new field she pioneered, which researches the design and use of technology that focuses on the interfaces between buildings and their users. She is the founding director of the Innovation in Integrated Informatics LAB and the director of USC's Center for Intelligent Environments (CENTIENTS). She puts a specific focus on human-building communication to change both user behavior and building behavior through trust in automation. Her research puts a deliberate emphasis on people-centric artificial intelligence for the built environment, for example smart workstations to improve well-being in the workplace.

== Biography ==
Becerik-Gerber was born in İzmit, Turkey. She completed her undergraduate studies at the Istanbul Technical University (1999). She then moved to the United States, to continue her graduate studies at the University of California, Berkeley, where she earned her MSc in Engineering in 2002 and a Doctor of Design (DDes) from Harvard University in 2006. She worked as a management consultant at Camp Dresser and McKee (CDM) between 2006 and 2008. In 2008, she joined the faculty at the University of Southern California as an Assistant Professor of Civil and Environmental Engineering. She was promoted to Associate Professor in 2015 and to Full Professor in 2019. She has been honored with the "Dean's Professor" title in 2020. Becerik-Gerber is appointed Chair of the Sonny Astani Department of Civil and Environmental Engineering in July 2021. She has been appointed as senior research fellows in CREATE in 2024.

== Awards and honors ==
Becerik-Gerber held the Stephen Schrank Early Career Chair between 2012 and 2019. Her work have been recognized through various awards, including the MIT Technology Review's TR35 Recognition in 2012, an NSF CAREER Award in 2014, and a Rutherford Visiting Fellowship at the Alan Turing Institute in 2018. She has served as an associate editor for the Journal of Computing in Civil Engineering since 2011 and is an Editorial Board Member of Scientific Reports since 2021. She serves on the Board on Infrastructure and the Constructed Environment (BICE) of the National Academies of Sciences, Engineering and Medicine. She has been elected as a member of the National Academy of Construction (NAC) in 2021. In addition, she received mentoring and leadership recognitions such as the Mellon Mentoring Award (2017) and an Executive Leadership in Academic Technology, Engineering and Science (ELATES) Fellowship (2021) which speak to her commitment to education and service. In 2022, she received an LA Area Emmy Award as a co-producer of the documentary, "Lives, Not Grades," which told the story of a novel course, she co-designed and co-taught, that focused on engineering innovation for global challenges. In 2023, the Los Angeles Business Journal recognized her as a "Leader of Influence: Thriving in Their 40s." Additionally, she received ASCE Computing in Civil Engineering Award in 2023 and ASCE Peurifoy Construction Research Award in 2024.

== Selected works ==
1. Ahmadi-Karvigh, Simin; Becerik-Gerber, Burcin; Soibelman, Lucio (2019). "Intelligent adaptive automation: A framework for an activity-driven and user-centered building automation". Energy and Buildings. 188–189: 184–199. Bibcode:2019EneBu.188..184A. doi:10.1016/j.enbuild.2019.02.007.
2. Khashe, Saba; Lucas, Gale; Becerik-Gerber, Burcin; Gratch, Jonathan (2018). "Establishing Social Dialog between Buildings and Their Users". International Journal of Human–Computer Interaction. 35 (17): 1545–1556. doi:10.1080/10447318.2018.1555346. S2CID 59286270.
3. Aryal, Ashrant; Anselmo, Francesco; Becerik-Gerber, Burcin (2018). "Smart IoT desk for personalizing indoor environmental conditions". Proceedings of the 8th International Conference on the Internet of Things - IOT '18. pp. 1–6. doi:10.1145/3277593.3277614. ISBN 978-1-4503-6564-2. S2CID 52982125.
4. Khashe, Saba; Lucas, Gale; Becerik-Gerber, Burcin; Gratch, Jonathan (2017). "Buildings with persona: Towards effective building-occupant communication". Computers in Human Behavior. 75: 607–618. doi:10.1016/j.chb.2017.05.040.
5. Heydarian, Arsalan; Pantazis, Evangelos; Wang, Alan; Gerber, David; Becerik-Gerber, Burcin (2017). "Towards user centered building design: Identifying end-user lighting preferences via immersive virtual environments". Automation in Construction. 81: 56–66. doi:10.1016/j.autcon.2017.05.003.
6. Ahmadi-Karvigh, Simin; Ghahramani, Ali; Becerik-Gerber, Burcin; Soibelman, Lucio (2017). "One size does not fit all: Understanding user preferences for building automation systems". Energy and Buildings. 145: 163–173. Bibcode:2017EneBu.145..163A. doi:10.1016/j.enbuild.2017.04.015.
7. Jazizadeh, Farrokh; Ghahramani, Ali; Becerik-Gerber, Burcin; Kichkaylo, Tatiana; Orosz, Michael (2014). "Human-Building Interaction Framework for Personalized Thermal Comfort-Driven Systems in Office Buildings". Journal of Computing in Civil Engineering. 28: 2–16. doi:10.1061/(ASCE)CP.1943-5487.0000300.
