= Mustafa Cenk Gursoy =

Turkish-American electrical engineer

- Education: Princeton University
- Occupation: Professor of Electrical Engineering
- Awards: NSF CAREER Award
- Scientific career
- Fields: Communication Theory
- Workplaces: Syracuse University
- Doctoral advisor: Vincent Poor, Sergio Verdu
- Website: https://ecs.syr.edu/faculty/gursoy/

Mustafa Cenk Gursoy is a professor of electrical engineering and computer science at Syracuse University since 2011. He was named Fellow of the Institute of Electrical and Electronics Engineers (IEEE) in 2026 for contributions to learning-based decision making and optimal resource management in low-latency wireless networks. That same year he was also elected as an AAIS Fellow.

Gursoy works on wireless networking, including 5G technology, unmanned aerial vehicles, radar systems, and machine learning.
