= Timothy Guy Kent =

Canadian-American artist

Tim Kent
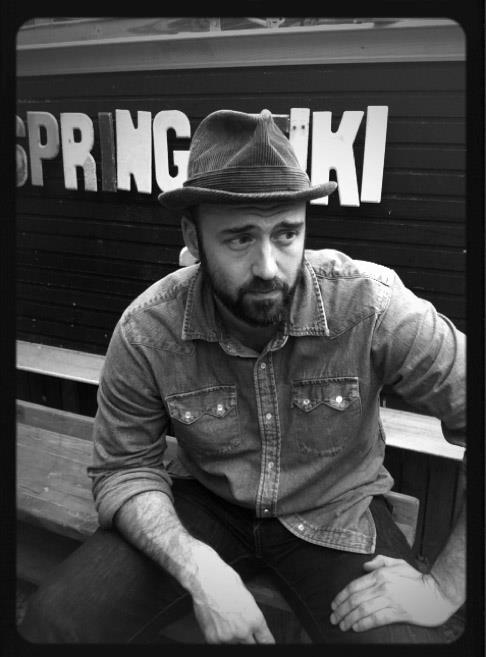
- Known for: Painting, Drawing, Music
- Movement: Postmodernism

Tim Kent is a Canadian-American artist who lives and works in New York City. Kent's primary medium is painting, but he has also worked in architectural design, video, drawing, animation, and music. Tim Kent's recent works explore the concept and impact of techno-industrial expansionism and the need to make order in an hyperinformational era. He is currently represented by SLAG Gallery in New York.

Born in Vancouver, Canada of a Turkish father and an English mother, Tim was originally Timothy Guy Ceyişakar before his father changed the family name. He moved to New York as a teenager. He is the original bass player for the hard rock band The Giraffes, playing with them from 1996 - 2002. Kent currently lives in Brooklyn with his wife.
