= Tansel Turgut =

Turkish-American cardiologist and chess player

Personal information
- Born: 1966 (age 59–60)

Chess career
- Country: Turkey
- Title: FIDE Master (2014); International Correspondence Chess Grandmaster (2007)
- FIDE rating: 2207 (August 2021)
- Peak rating: 2305 (June 2015)

Tansel Turgut (born 1966) is a Turkish-American cardiologist and chess player. He was born in Turkey and moved to the US in 1992. He practices medicine at the Beacon Medical Group's Advanced Cardiology Specialists division in South Bend, Indiana.

Turgut was the 1997 state chess champion of Louisiana, and the 1998 state champion of Michigan. In 2023, he also won the Indiana State Chess Championship. In 2007, he earned the title of International Correspondence Chess Grandmaster, the only grandmaster of correspondence chess from Turkey. The International Correspondence Chess Federation (ICCF) has given him the highest rating among US correspondence chess players. He also became a FIDE Master in over the board play in 2014.

On August 11, 2025, ICCF announced that Turgut and nine other players had tied for first in the 33rd Correspondence World Championship tournament, making them co-world champions.

His son, Aydin Turgut, is also a strong chess player.
