= Mike Sarimsakci =

Turkish-born businessman (born 1967)

- Born: 1967 (age 58–59)
- Occupation: businessman

Mukemmel "Mike" Sarimsakci (born 1967) is a Turkish-born businessman and primary developer of Dallas, Texas's 211 North Ervay and Butler Brothers Building. Sarimsakci is a principal of Alto / Alterra.
