= Ali Sar =

Turkish journalist and former president of the Hollywood Foreign Press Association

- Born: Turkey
- Occupation: Journalist
- Known for: Former president of the Hollywood Foreign Press Association

Ali Sar is a Turkish journalist and former president of the Hollywood Foreign Press Association (HFPA). He previously served as vice president of HFPA until president Lorenzo Soria died in 2020, at which time Sar was appointed. He has held other roles within the organization, including treasurer in 2019. He was replaced as president by Helen Hoehne in 2021.

== Career ==
Sar was nominated for an Emmy in 2019 for being the executive producer of the 76th Golden Globe Awards.

As of 2020, Sar was working as a special correspondent for The Moscow Times. That same year, Sar had been involved with the HFPA for 35 years. He had previously served as a managing editor of the Los Angeles Daily News in the United States for 10 years. Additionally, he worked as a news executive for Thomson Reuters.

== Awards and nominations ==
Year	Ceremony	Nominated work	Award	Result	Ref
2019	Emmy Awards	76th Golden Globe Awards	Himself	Nominated	
