= Melik Demirel =

- Born: Melik Cumhur Demirel
- Education: Boğaziçi University; Carnegie Mellon University
- Scientific career
- Fields: Materials science
- Workplaces: Pennsylvania State University
- Thesis: Linking experimental characterization and computational modeling in microstructural evolution (2002)
- Doctoral advisor: Anthony Rollett
- Website: mri.psu.edu/mri/personnel-directory/mcd18

Melik Cumhur Demirel is a Turkish materials scientist and engineer. He is a professor at the Pennsylvania State University, with affiliations at the Materials Research Institute and the Huck Institutes of the Life Sciences, and in 2019 he was named the Lloyd and Dorothy Foehr Huck Chair in Biomimetic Materials. He founded the Center for Research on Advanced Fiber Technologies at Penn State and served as its director, and was elected a Senior Member of the National Academy of Inventors in 2019. His research spans biomimetic materials, nanostructured thin films, protein engineering, and biomanufacturing for applications in energy, biomedicine, security, and defense. He received his B.S. and M.S. degrees from Boğaziçi University. and Ph.D. from Carnegie Mellon University.

== Honors and awards ==
- 2026 – Future of Capitalism Award (London), for the development of sustainable Procell protein fibers by Tandem Repeat Technologies, of which Demirel is a co-founder.
- 2022 – Microfiber Innovation Challenge ($150,000), Conservation X Labs.
- 2019 – Senior Member, National Academy of Inventors.
- 2019 – Lloyd and Dorothy Foehr Huck Chair in Biomimetic Materials, Pennsylvania State University.
- 2013 – Penn State Engineering Alumni Society Outstanding Research Award.
- 2010 – Wyss Institute Visiting Scholar, Harvard University.
- 2008 – Nicholas and Gelsa Pelick Biotechnology Innovation Award, Pennsylvania State University.
- 2007 – Young Investigator Award, Office of Naval Research, U.S. Department of Defense.
- 2005 – Alexander von Humboldt Research Fellowship.

== Commercialization and Tandem Repeat Technologies ==
In 2018, Demirel co-founded Tandem Repeat Technologies, a Pennsylvania State University spin-out company that biomanufactures protein-based fibers by precision fermentation, originally inspired by the protein architecture of squid ring teeth. The company's textile platform, branded Squitex and later Procell, won the 2022 Microfiber Innovation Challenge from Conservation X Labs and the 2026 Future of Capitalism Competition in London. In October 2025 the Austrian industrial- equipment manufacturer ANDRITZ announced a collaboration with Tandem Repeat to develop industrial-scale solutions for producing Procell fibers.

== Publications ==
- Malvadkar, Niranjan A.; Hancock, Matthew J.; Sekeroglu, Koray; Dressick, Walter J.; Demirel, Melik C. (2010-10-10). "An engineered anisotropic nanofilm with unidirectional wetting properties". Nature Materials. 9 (12). Springer Science and Business Media LLC: 1023–1028. Bibcode:2010NatMa...9.1023M. doi:10.1038/nmat2864. ISSN 1476-1122. PMID 20935657.
- Guerette, Paul A; Hoon, Shawn; Seow, Yiqi; Raida, Manfred; Masic, Admir; et al. (2013-09-08). "Accelerating the design of biomimetic materials by integrating RNA-seq with proteomics and materials science". Nature Biotechnology. 31 (10). Springer Science and Business Media LLC: 908–915. doi:10.1038/nbt.2671. ISSN 1087-0156. PMID 24013196.
- Demirel, Melik C.; Lesk, Arthur M. (2005-11-10). "Molecular Forces in Antibody Maturation". Physical Review Letters. 95 (20) 208106. American Physical Society (APS). Bibcode:2005PhRvL..95t8106D. doi:10.1103/physrevlett.95.208106. ISSN 0031-9007. PMID 16384106.
- Demirel, M. C.; Kuprat, A. P.; George, D. C.; Rollett, A. D. (2003-01-09). "Bridging Simulations and Experiments in Microstructure Evolution". Physical Review Letters. 90 (1) 016106. American Physical Society (APS). Bibcode:2003PhRvL..90a6106D. doi:10.1103/physrevlett.90.016106. ISSN 0031-9007. PMID 12570632.
- Bahar, Ivet; Atilgan, Ali Rana; Demirel, Melik C.; Erman, Burak (1998-03-23). "Vibrational Dynamics of Folded Proteins: Significance of Slow and Fast Motions in Relation to Function and Stability". Physical Review Letters. 80 (12). American Physical Society (APS): 2733–2736. Bibcode:1998PhRvL..80.2733B. doi:10.1103/physrevlett.80.2733. ISSN 0031-9007.
