= Ayse Wilson =

Turkish-American artist

Ayse Wilson is a Turkish-American artist who lives and works in New York City. She is represented by the PG Art Gallery in Istanbul and Jack Geary Contemporary in New York City. She studied classical painting in Florence, Italy and received her MFA from the New York Academy of Art in 2004. Shortly following, she worked for several years as a painting assistant to Jeff Koons, assisting with large-scale, photo-realistic paintings. Her work has been exhibited internationally, in both Turkey and New York.
