= Serkan Golge =

Turkish-American scientist

Serkan Golge (Serkan Gölge) is a Turkish-American scientist who was held in prison and house arrest in Turkey for nearly four years, as part of a crackdown by Turkish authorities after the country's failed coup d'état attempt of 2016. His imprisonment stemmed in part from his possession of a single American $1 bill, which, according to the Erdoğan government, was a sign of a Gülen movement link.

== Career ==
Golge worked as a full-time NASA contractor on NASA's proposed human mission to Mars, where he researched the effects of solar radiation on astronauts in space. He had graduated from Fatih University in Istanbul and moved to the United States in the early 2000s, where he received his Ph.D. in physics in 2010 from Old Dominion University in Norfolk, Virginia. Both he and his wife became naturalized U.S. citizens the same year. As a dual Turkish-U.S. citizen, Golge lived in a southwest Houston suburb with his wife and two young children.

== Imprisonment ==
On July 23, 2016, as he and his family were ending a month-long vacation with his parents in Turkey’s southern Hatay province, Golge was arrested by the Turkish government, following a tip from a disgruntled relative who had a dispute with him over a family inheritance, and who allegedly told authorities the scientist was a spy for the CIA. Golge was one of more than 110,000 people, including at least nine American citizens and several U.S. Consulate employees, detained during the post-coup crackdown by the Turkish government in July 2016. His home was searched, and he was charged with participating in terrorism and conspiring against the government as a member of the Gülen movement, which Turkey designates the "Fethullahist Terrorist Organization". As evidence the prosecution presented a $1 bill found in his apartment (similar to many other national security trials in which Turkish prosecutors have cited possession of American dollars as evidence that the accused was linked to the Gülen movement), the fact that he had a bank account at a bank linked to Gülen supporters and that he had studied at a university linked to the Gülen movement. Golge denied being a member of the Gülen movement or undertaking any anti-government activities. On February 8, 2018, he was sentenced to 7.5 years in prison, a sentence that was later reduced to 5 years.

The government in Ankara believes that the Gülen movement is responsible for the 2016 Turkish coup d'état attempt and has arrested many of its members, followers and sympathizers, and suspected sympathizers, members and followers since the coup's failure in July 2016. Suspected conspirators have included judges, academics, and journalists.

=== Release ===
After nearly three years of imprisonment, Golge was abruptly released in May 2019 into house arrest and frozen Turkish bank accounts. He returned to the United States in June 2020.

== See also ==
- Effect of spaceflight on the human body
