= Caglar Oskay =

Engineer at Vanderbilt University

Çağlar Oskay is an engineer and Cornelius Vanderbilt Professor of Engineering at Vanderbilt University. At Vanderbilt, he is a professor of civil and environmental engineering and of mechanical engineering; since 2022 he serves as chair of the Department of Civil and Environmental Engineering. He is also the director of the Multiscale Computational Mechanics Laboratory.

Oskay received a B.Sc. in civil engineering from the Middle East Technical University in Ankara, Turkey, as well as M.Sc. degrees in applied mathematics and civil engineering and a Ph.D. in civil engineering from Rensselaer Polytechnic Institute. He joined Vanderbilt in 2006. From 2019 to 2021, he was the director of the Engineering for Civil Infrastructure Program at the National Science Foundation. Oskay was awarded his endowed chair in 2023.

In 2017, he was named a fellow of the American Society of Mechanical Engineers. He was additionally made a fellow of the U.S. Association for Computational Mechanics in 2025.
