= Osman Yaşar =

American computer scientist

Osman Yaşar (pronounced [jaʃaɾ]) is Empire Innovation Professor at the Computational Science (CPS) department at State University of New York (SUNY) College at Brockport. He holds 3 master's degrees (physics, nuclear engineering, computer sciences) and a Ph.D. degree (engineering physics). His areas of interest are supercomputing applications, computational fluid and particle dynamics, engine combustion modeling, parallel computing, plasma and radiation hydrodynamics, and adaptive mesh refinement. He established the first undergraduate program in computational science in the United States. He also established computational approach to math, science, and technology (C-MST) as a pedagogy at K-12 level. Dr. Yaşar testified before U.S. Congress about his efforts in improving math and science education.

He works closely with the industry, including General Motors, Chrysler, Cummins Engine, Intel, and Lockheed Martin. He served as the President of the Intel Supercomputer Users Group. He made important contributions in the field of science, engineering, and education. As a plasma physicist, he tackled the field of ignition in the combustion (mechanical engineering) community with more accurate models and as a computer scientist he developed algorithms to run record-breaking simulations on particle and fluid systems on supercomputers. Dr. Yaşar has more than 70 publications, developed more than 12 industrial codes, and served as Guest Editor for a number of Special Issues in his field.
