= Koray Çalışkan =

Turkish economic sociologist

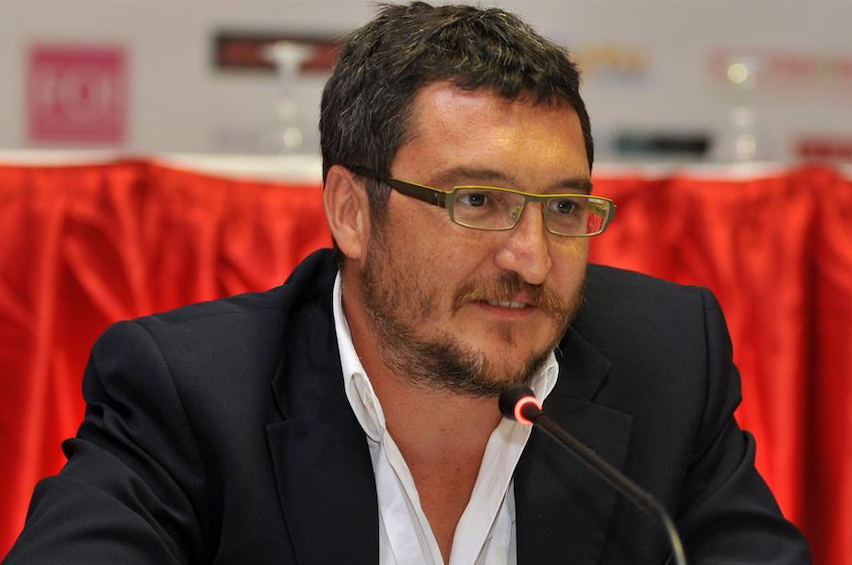

Academic background
- Education: Boğaziçi University; New York University

Academic work
- Discipline: Economics, socioeconomics
- Institutions: Parsons School of Design

Koray Çalışkan is a Turkish economic sociologist and organizational designer. He is a tenured professor at Parsons School of Design, The New School, Associate Editor of the Journal of Cultural Economy, and the Editor-in-Chief of Journal of Design Strategies.

Caliskan is married with two children and resides in Brooklyn, New York City.

== Education and Career ==
He received his B.A. in Political Science, Bogazici University, Istanbul and M.A. in Politics, NYU, New York in 1999. He received his Ph.D. with distinction from NYU’s Politics Department, with which he won the Malcolm Kerr Social Science Award from MESA. Prior to joining Parsons School of Design, he was teaching at Bogazici University.

== Research and Books ==
Caliskan’s recent work examines cryptocurrencies, blockchain technologies, and the dynamics of platform economies.

Market Threads: How Cotton Farmers and Traders Create a Global Commodity came out from Princeton University Press and focused on global commodity markets and relations of economization.

Data Money: Inside Cryptocurrencies, Their Communities, Markets, and Blockchains (2023) came out from Columbia University Press and is about cryptocurrencies, their communities and blockchains.

== Film projects ==
He directed, produced and wrote seven fiction and documentary films, including "Esma"., shown at the Cannes Film Festival. He was the producer and co-writer of "In Flames", feature film. He was the director of the film "Last Villagers of Avshar", producer of "Pipelines Made up of Donkeys" film and producer of the documentary "Republic of Wonderland: Turkish TV Series in the World".

2016. Director, The Last Peasants of Avshar. Documentary, 42’26’’, English, Al Jazeera Documentary Channel.

2015. Producer and Writer, Pipeline Made up of Donkeys. Documentary. 45’, Kurdish and Turkish, Al Jazeera. (Not Released by the network).

2013. Producer, The Republic of Wonderland: Turkey. Documentary. 200’, 4 episodes, Haberturk TV.

2011. Script co-writer and Producer, In Flames, Fiction, Turkish with English Subtitles, 100’, Awards: Best Actor (Ankara Film Festival, Varna Film Festival), Best Actress (Ankara Film Festival, Varna Film Festival), Best Editor (Ankara Film Festival). Available on i-Tunes.

2009. Director and Script writer, Esma, Short Fiction, 18’, Turkish with English Subtitles, (Cannes Film Festival, Tampere Film Festival Competition).

== Awards ==
His last research project on cryptocurrencies, their global communities and blockchains was selected to be a winner of the Scientific Breakthrough of the Year Award in Social Sciences and Humanities by the Falling Walls Foundation. Currently, on an ESRC grant, he is carrying out research with his team on the economic sociology of digital advertisements.
