= Pinar Oya Yilmaz =

Geologist

- Education: University of Texas at Austin
- Scientific career
- Thesis: Geology of the Antalya Complex, SW Turkey (1981)

Pinar Oya Yilmaz is a geologist known for her work in the oil and gas industry.

== Education and career ==
Pinar Oya Yilmaz was born in Izmir, Turkey. After obtaining her Bachelor of Science in Geology from Hamilton College in 1976, she received her master's degree from Bryn Mawr College, in which she chose the Taurus Mountains in Turkey as her field of work in 1977. She then earned her Ph.D. at the University of Texas in 1978-1981. She began working for Mobil Oil in 1980 and completed her Ph.D. a year later.

For Yilmaz’s first well site work with Mobil Oil, she was placed offshore of the Cook Inlet, Alaska, United States. She then proceeded to production drilling located in Kansas, Oklahoma and the Texas panhandle, where she helped drill 72 wells. Yilmaz joined Exxon Production Research Company in 1984 and transferred to Exxon Exploration company in 1995.

From 2004 until 2005 Yilmaz was the President of the Geological Society of America's International Division. She worked in the National Science Foundation's Earthscope Science and Education Committee from 2005 until 2007. In a 2018 interview Yilmaz shared some of the challenges she faced while working as a woman in the oil and gas industry.

Her research activities spanned from global paleogeographic studies to regional projects, as well as fault seals in reservoirs.

She was elected from the America Association of Petroleum Geologists and currently serves as Chairman of the 2024 International Petroleum Technology Conference.

== Selected publications ==
- Yilmaz, P. O. (1988). Tectonic Framework of Turkish Sedimentary Basins: ABSTRACT. AAPG Bulletin, 72. https://doi.org/10.1306/703C97A3-1707-11D7-8645000102C1865D
- Norton, I. O., Yilmaz, P. O. (1995). Mesozoic to Cenozoic Paleogeography and Tectonics of the Apulian Platform: Abstract. AAPG Bulletin, 79. https://doi.org/10.1306/7834efed-1721-11d7-8645000102c1865d.
- Yılmaz, Pınar O. (1984). "Fossil and K-Ar data for the age of the Antalya complex, S W Turkey". Geological Society, London, Special Publications. 17 (1): 335–347. Bibcode:1984GSLSP..17..335Y. doi:10.1144/GSL.SP.1984.017.01.24. ISSN 0305-8719. S2CID 129315025.
- Kayabali, Kamil; Yilmaz, Pınar; Fener, Mustafa; Aktürk, Özgür; Habibzadeh, Farhad (2018-06-27). "Assessment of souil liquefaction using the energy approach". Bulletin of the Mineral Research and Exploration. 156 (156): 193–204. doi:10.19111/bulletinofmre.351257. ISSN 0026-4563.
- Mello, Marcio Rocha; Yilmaz, Pinar Oya; Katz, Barry J., eds. (2021). The Supergiant Lower Cretaceous Pre-Salt Petroleum Systems of the Santos Basin, Brazil: AAPG Memoir 124.

== Awards and honors ==
- In 2000 the American Association of Petroleum Geologists awarded Yilmaz with their Distinguished Service Award.
- ExxonMobil presented her with the President’s Award in 2008.
- She was elected a fellow of the Geological Society of America in 2019.
- In 2020 the Geological Society of America presented Yilmaz with their International Distinguished Career Award.
- She was recognized as an Energy Trailblazer by the Leadership Excellence for Women Awards & Symposium in 2020 (LEWAS).
- In 2021 Yilmaz was given the ElaPorElas Leadership Award by the Association of Brazilian Petroleum Geologists for her contributions to workplace gender equality.
