= Hungry Ghost Coffee =

New York City coffee shop chain

Hungry Ghost Coffee is a New York City–based coffee shop chain. It was founded in 2012, and as of 2019, it had eleven locations in New York City, with eight being in Brooklyn.

== History ==
Hungry Ghost Coffee was founded in Brooklyn by Murat Uyaroglu, a Turkish immigrant, with coffee sourced from Stumptown Coffee Roasters. Uyaroglu had opened an internet café back in Turkey during his college years, then moved to Prospect Heights with his wife a few years later. In 2006, he took over a coffee shop on Sterling Place and borrowed money from his father-in-law to revitalize it.

In 2012, Uyaroglu designed and opened the flagship store for Hungry Ghost Coffee on Flatbush Avenue. In 2017, he had a total of six locations. The name is a reference to the hungry ghosts—East Asian "demon-like creatures who are afflicted with insatiable desire, hunger or thirst."
