= Yaman Yener =

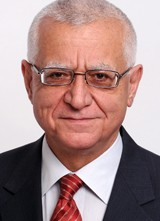
- Born: October 18, 1946; Ankara, Turkey
- Died: June 14, 2013 (aged 66); Newton MA, United States
- Education: BS (1968); MS (1970); PhD (1973)
- Alma mater: METU Ankara, Turkey; NCSU, Raleigh NC, United States
- Spouse: Demet Yener
- Children: Zeynep Yener

Yaman Yener (October 18, 1946 - June 14, 2013) was a Turkish-American scientist.

== Biography ==
Yaman Yener was Senior Associate Dean of Engineering for Faculty Affairs and Carl R. Hurtig Distinguished Professor of Engineering at Northeastern University, Boston, MA. He received his BS (1968) and MS (1970) degrees in Mechanical Engineering from Middle East Technical University (METU), Ankara, Turkey, and his Ph.D. in Mechanical Engineering from North Carolina State University in 1973. He was on METU faculty from 1974 to 1980, holding positions as Assistant and associate professor of Mechanical Engineering. He served as the Chairman of the Mechanical Engineering Department at METU between 1978 and 1980. He was at the University of Delaware as Visiting associate professor from 1980 to 1982. He subsequently joined Northeastern University as associate professor of Mechanical Engineering in 1982. He was Acting Chairman of the department from July 1989 through December 1990.

Yener was Associate Dean of Engineering for Research and Graduate Studies between 1993 and 2010. In that capacity, he served as Director of the Graduate School of Engineering, and coordinated and promoted research activities within the college. Starting from 1993, he helped direct the college's research efforts with a comprehensive and focused agenda to accomplish Northeastern's mission of gaining recognition as a national research institution. He was directly in charge of three interdisciplinary Master's level graduate programs: Information Systems, Computer Systems Engineering (Engineering Software Design and CAD/CAM), and Telecommunication Systems Management. He played a leadership role in the development of a new interdisciplinary PhD program in Bioengineering and a new professional master's program in Energy Systems, both began in fall 2009.

Starting from 1993, he directed the research efforts of the faculty and researchers of the College of Engineering with a comprehensive and focused agenda to accomplish Northeastern University's mission of gaining recognition as a national research institution. During 2001-2002 College's faculty and researchers attracted $19.7 million in external funding to support their research and scholarly activities. This represents a steady increase of more than two-fold over the period of Dr. Yener's tenure as Associate Dean.

In 1997 Yener established the college's Industrial Liaison Program to foster and maintain customized, responsive, long-term relationships between the college and Industry to stimulate collaborative research activities. This program assisted companies in identifying and accessing College of Engineering faculty expertise and research centers and works to foster Industry-University partnerships. Frequent campus visits by industry personnel and company site visits by the faculty became a regular activity.

In addition to coordinating the efforts of individual faculty and groups of faculty, Yener played a pivotal role in the establishment of the Center for Advanced Microgravity Materials Processing (CAMMP) at Northeastern University in 1997. CAMMP was one of only 10 NASA centers under the Space Product Division at major universities nationwide and the only one exclusively focused on materials science. Its mission was to stimulate innovations in materials technology and to develop commercial products through knowledge gained from ground-based and, where appropriate, microgravity research.

== Selected publications ==
- Heat Conduction, Fifth Edition. CRC Press. July 6, 2018.
- Convective Heat Transfer, Third Edition. CRC Press. December 17, 2013.
- Heat Conduction, Fourth Edition. CRC Press. June 9, 2008. Archived from the original on August 16, 2018.
- Microscale Heat Transfer - Fundamentals and Applications. July 18, 2004.
- Kakaç, Sadik; Yener, Yaman (December 16, 1994). Convective Heat Transfer Second Edition. CRC Press. ISBN 9780849399398.
- Yan, Xiaojun (1993). "On the Penetration Depth in Fourier Heat Conduction". Heat Conduction Third Edition. American Institute of Aeronautics and Astronautics. doi:10.2514/6.2002-2881. ISBN 978-1-62410-118-2.
- Yüncü, Hafit; Paykoc, E.; Yener, Y. (1987). Solar Energy Utilization. Springer. ISBN 9789400936317.

== Awards ==
- AID Scholarship to sponsor Ph.D. study at North Carolina State University, 1970.
- The Honor Society of Phi Kappa Phi award of Recognition of Intellectual Attainment and Achievement in Research as a Doctor of Philosophy Candidate at North Carolina State University, 1973.
- The American Society of Mechanical Engineers (ASME) - Fellow, 2000.
- Dean's Award in recognition of exemplary performance in the College of Engineering, Northeastern University, 2008.
- American Society for Engineering Education (ASEE) - Fellow, 2009
