= Bilal Akin =

Electrical engineer at The University of Texas at Dallas

Bilal Akin is an electrical engineer and faculty member of The University of Texas at Dallas. He is the recipient of TAMEST 2026 Edith and Peter O’Donnell Awards, National Science Foundation CAREER Award and is a fellow of the IEEE.

== Education ==
Akin studied at the Middle East Technical University in Turkey, where he obtained his bachelor's and master's degrees in science. In 2007, he received his PhD in electrical engineering from Texas A&M University.

== Career ==
Akin has been a faculty member of The University of Texas at Dallas since 2012, serving as director of their Power Electronics and Drives Lab. He is a vehicular electronics and systems area editor for the IEEE journal Transactions on Vehicular Technology. Akin previously worked in research and development with Toshiba (2005–2008) and Texas Instruments (2008–2012).

== Honours ==
- TAMEST 2026 Edith and Peter O’Donnell Awards
- National Science Foundation CAREER Award no.1454311 (2015)
- Jonsson School Faculty Research Award (2015)
- Transactions on Vehicular Technology Top Editor Award (2016)
- IEEE Industry Applications Society Society Prize Paper Award (2018)
- Jonsson School Outstanding Faculty Teaching Award (2019)
- Fellow of the IEEE "for contributions to control, diagnosis and condition monitoring of AC drives" (2023)
