= Sennur Ulukus =

Researcher

Şennur Ulukuş from the University of Maryland, College Park, MD was named Fellow of the Institute of Electrical and Electronics Engineers (IEEE) in 2016 for contributions to characterizing performance limits of wireless networks.
