= Stephen Sanford (polo player) =

American polo player and racehorse owner

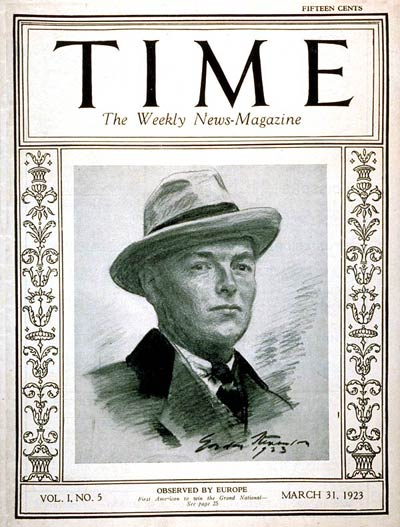
Time cover, 31 Mar 1923

Stephen Sanford (September 14, 1898 – May 31, 1977), nicknamed "Laddie", was an American polo champion and owner of Thoroughbred racing horses.

== Biography ==
=== Early life ===
Stephen Sanford was born in 1898. His father was John Sanford (1851–1939) and his mother, Ethel Sanford. His paternal grandfather, whom he was named after, was Stephen Sanford (1826–1913). His paternal great-grandfather was John Sanford (1803-1857). His maternal grandfather was Henry Shelton Sanford (1823–1891). His maternal great-grandfather was Nehemiah Curtis Sanford (1792–1841).

He was educated at St. Mark's School, a private boarding school in Southborough, Massachusetts. He graduated from Yale University and attended the University of Cambridge.

=== Business career ===
He sat on the board of directors of the Bigelow-Sanford Carpet Company, a family business.

=== Polo ===
He was a member of the Meadowbrook Polo Club. He played on the Hurricanes Polo Team.

In 1925, he competed in the U.S. Open Polo Championship with his Hurricanes Polo Team (Pat Roark, John Wodehouse, Major Louis Beard), losing to the Meadowbrook team (Cornelius Vanderbilt Whitney, Thomas Hitchcock, Sr., Elmer Boeseke, Devereux Milburn). However, his Hurricanes team won in 1926, with Eric Leader Pedley, Charles Thomas Irvine Roark and Robert E. Strawbridge, Jr. He won again in 1929 (with Charles Thomas Irvine Roark, J. Watson Webb, Jr. and Robert E. Strawbridge, Jr.) and in 1930 (with Eric Leader Pedley, Charles Thomas Irvine Roark and Robert E. Strawbridge, Jr.). Two decades later, he won in 1948 (with James Larry Sheerin, Peter Perkins, Cecil S. Smith) and in 1949 (with James Larry Sheerin, Robert L. Cavanagh and Cecil S. Smith).

In 1931, his Hurricanes team (with Pat Roark, James Colt and Lindsay C. Howard) won the Teddy Miller Memorial at the Midwick Country Club in Alhambra, California against the Argentine team (Juan Benítez, Santiago Cavanagh, Luis Duggan, Daniel Kearney and Juan Reynal).

=== Country sports ===
Beyond polo, he also went to horse races and fox hunts. He took up fox hunting while he was a student at Cambridge. In 1923, his horse Sergeant Murphy won the Grand National in Liverpool, becoming the first American-owned horse to do so.

=== Personal life ===
In 1933, he married actress Mary Duncan (1895–1993). They were introduced by actress Marion Davies at a polo match. He also had an affair with Edwina Mountbatten, Countess Mountbatten of Burma (1901–1960).

His primary residence was the Los Incas mansion in Palm Beach, Florida, where he lived with his wife, who became a philanthropist. They entertained Saud of Saudi Arabia (1902–1969), among many distinguished guests. He suffered a stroke in 1965 and became confined home in a wheelchair until his death in 1977, aged 78. He was buried in the Green Hill Cemetery in Amsterdam, New York.

=== Legacy ===
The character Ned Seton played by Lew Ayres in Holiday (dir. George Cukor, 1938) was loosely based on him. He was posthumously inducted into the Museum of Polo and Hall of Fame in 2015.
