= William R. Claypool =

American horse-racing trainer

William Claypool
Personal information
- Born: July 16, 1843 Andrew County, Missouri
- Died: May 26, 1888 (aged 44) Sacramento, California
- Resting place: Masonic Lawn Cemetery, Sacramento, California
- Occupation: Racehorse Trainer

Horse racing career
- Sport: Horse racing

Major racing wins
- Emporium Stakes (1885); Hopeful Stakes (1885); September Stakes (1885); Stockton Stakes (1885); Withers Stakes (1885) American Classics wins: Belmont Stakes (1885)

Significant horses
- Ben Ali, Hidalgo, Philip S., Tyrant

William Redman Claypool (July 16, 1843 – May 26, 1888) was a California based trainer of Thoroughbred racehorses who won the 1885 Belmont Stakes with the colt Tyrant for nationally prominent owner J. B. A. Haggin. A major racing event on the East Coast, the Belmont Stakes would become the third leg of the U.S. Triple Crown series. That same year Claypool trained the two-year-old colt Ben Ali who would go on to win the 1886 Kentucky Derby.

Just two years after his success on the East Coast, William Claypool died at age 44 from Consumption.
