= Ben Ali =

Ben Ali may refer to:

== People ==
- Ben Ali (businessman) (1927–2009), founder of the restaurant Ben's Chili Bowl in Washington, DC, USA
- Habib Ben Ali (1941–1996), Tunisian criminal
- Ibrahim Ben Ali (1756–1800), soldier and physician who was one of the earliest American settlers of Turkish origin
- Mimoun Ben Ali (1935–2001), Spanish boxer
- Zine El Abidine Ben Ali (1936–2019), former president of Tunisia, 1987–2011
- Mohammed ben Ali R'bati (1861–1939), Moroccan painter
- James Ben Ali Haggin (1822–1914), American businessman
- James Ben Ali Haggin III (1882–1951), American artist and designer
- Salim Ben Ali (1918–2002), Comoran politician
- Yefet ben Ali (914–1009), Karaite rabbi

== Other ==
- Ben Ali (horse), winner of the 1886 Kentucky Derby
- Ben Ali, Sacramento, California, place in the USA
- Sidi M'hamed Ben Ali, town and commune in Relizane Province, Algeria
