= September Stakes (United States) =

- Class: Discontinued
- Location: Sheepshead Bay Race Track, Sheepshead Bay, New York, United States
- Inaugurated: 1884
- Race type: Thoroughbred – Flat racing

Race information
- Distance: 3/16 miles
- Surface: Dirt
- Track: left-handed
- Qualification: Three-year-olds

The September Stakes was an American Thoroughbred horse race held annually for the twenty-five years between 1884 and 1908 at Sheepshead Bay Race Track in Sheepshead Bay, New York. A race on dirt, it was open to three-year-old horses of either sex. It was contested at various distances as follows:

- 1884–1891 : 13/4 miles
- 1892–1907 : 13/8 miles
- 1908 : 11/16 miles

== Historical notes ==
First run on September 4, 1884, the race was won by George Lorillard's Louisette. Under Canadian jockey Harry Blaylock the filly led all the way and won with ease.

The Thomas Clay McDowell colt Batten won the 1899 edition by 20 lengths in a canter with a time of 2:21 4/5 that at the time was only a fraction off the track record.

=== Future Hall of Fame winners ===
The September Stakes would produce three winners whose racing careers achieved the sport's ultimate acknowledgement of greatness with induction into the U.S. Racing Hall of Fame. The first was Kingston, a part of the 1955 inaugural class, then Beldame in 1956 who was followed by Salvator in 1988.

== The end of a race and of a racetrack ==
The 1908 passage of the Hart–Agnew anti-betting legislation by the New York Legislature under Republican Governor Charles Evans Hughes led to a state-wide shutdown of racing in 1911 and 1912. Sheepshead Bay Race Track officials had no choice but to cancel some races in order to maintain others. As such, the final running of the September Stakes took place on September 8, 1908. A February 21, 1913 ruling by the New York Supreme Court, Appellate Division saw horse racing return in 1913. However, it was too late for the Sheepshead Bay horse racing facility and it never reopened.

== Records ==
Speed record:

- 2:19.00 @ 13/8 miles: Nealon (1906)
- 3:03.00 @ 13/4 miles: Peg Woffington (1888)

Most wins by a jockey:

- 2 – Jim McLaughlin (1887, 1889)
- 2 – George M. Odom (1900, 1902)
- 2 – Frank O'Neill (1903, 1904)
- 2 – Willie Simms (1894, 1895)

Most wins by a trainer:

- 2 – Matthew Byrnes (1884, 1889)
- 2 – William Lakeland (1888, 1898)
- 2 – John W. Rogers (1894, 1900)

Most wins by an owner:

- 2 – James Ben Ali Haggin (1885, 1889)
- 2 – William Lakeland (1888, 1898)

== Winners ==
Year	Winner	Age	Jockey	Trainer	Owner	Dist. (Miles)	Time	Win$
1908	Big Chief	3	Carroll Shilling	Henry E. Rowell	Thomas H. Williams	13/16	2:10.40	$3,100
1907	Blue Book	3	R. Lowe	Stephen J. Lawler	James F. Carroll	13/8	2:23.00	$3,700
1906	Nealon	3	Willie Dugan	Herman R. Brandt	Barney Schreiber	13/8	2:19.00	$4,370
1905	Von Tromp	3	Gene Hildebrand	James G. Rowe Sr.	James R. Keene	13/8	2:21.20	$4,065
1904	Beldame	3	Frank O'Neill	Fred Burlew	Newton Bennington (Lessee)	13/8	2:19.60	$4,060
1903	The Picket	3	Frank O'Neill	Carroll B. Reed	Waldeck Stable (John Middleton & Karl Jungbluth)	13/8	2:20.60	$3,055
1902	Caughnawaga	3	George M. Odom	William Hayward Jr.	John Sanford	13/8	2:22.00	$2,490
1901	Blues	3	Willie Shaw	Thomas Welsh	Frank Farrell	13/8	2:22.40	$2,455
1900	Killashandra	3	George M. Odom	John W. Rogers	William Collins Whitney	13/8	2:22.00	$2,525
1899	Batten	3	Henry Spencer	Thomas Clay McDowell	Thomas Clay McDowell	13/8	2:21.80	$1,960
1898	George Boyd	3	Danny Maher	William Lakeland	William Lakeland	13/8	2:25.00	$1,810
1897	Challenger	3	Alonzo Clayton	Arthur White	William Laimbeer	13/8	2:24.40	$1,925
1896	Captive	3	Willie Martin	Patrick Dunne	Patrick Dunne	13/8	2:22.80	$1,850
1895	Nanki Pooh	3	Willie Simms	William Donohue	Erie Stable (F. D. & J. A. Beard)	13/8	2:21.00	$1,950
1894	Dorian	3	Willie Simms	John W. Rogers	John W. Rogers	13/8	2:21.40	$2,020
1893	Bassetlaw	3	Anthony Hamilton	Matthew M. Allen	William Easton	13/8	2:24.00	$3,507
1892	Pactolus	3	Marty Bergen		A. Wilson	13/8	2:22.00	$3,297
1891	Reckon	3	Fred Littlefield	R. Wyndham Walden	John A. & Alfred H. Morris	13/4	3:07.80	$2,225
1890	Judge Morrow	3	Fred Taral	Green B. Morris	Green B. Morris	13/4	3:09.00	$2,000
1889	Salvator	3	Jim McLaughlin	Matthew Byrnes	James Ben Ali Haggin	13/4	3:05.40	$2,475
1888	Peg Woffington	3	George Taylor	William Lakeland	William Lakeland	13/4	3:03.00	$3,475
1887	Kingston	3	Jim McLaughlin	Frank McCabe	Dwyer Brothers Stable	13/4	3:04.00	$3,350
1886	The Bard	3	William Hayward Sr.	John Huggins	Alexander Cassatt	13/4	3:05.00	$3,800
1885	Hidalgo	3	Patsy Duffy	William R. Claypool	James Ben Ali Haggin	13/4	3:09.50	$3,375
1884	Louisette	3	Harry Blaylock	Matthew Byrnes	George L. Lorillard	13/4	3:07.25	$2,450
