= Richard Lounsbery =

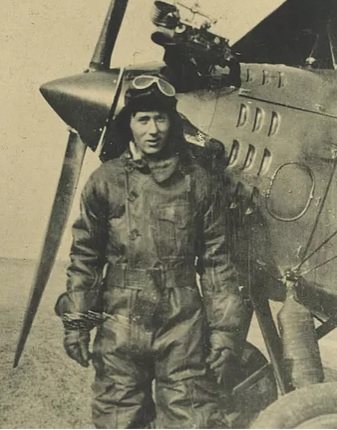
- Lounsbery as an aviator.
- Born: 1882; New York City
- Died: 1967
- Education: Harvard
- Occupation: Businessman

Richard Lounsbery (born in New York City in 1882, died 1967) was an American businessman. The Richard Lounsbery Foundation was set up with his family's wealth.

== Early life ==
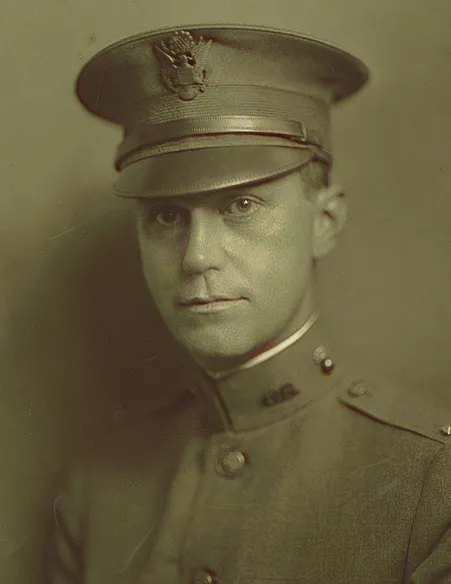
Lounsbery served in France as an Army lieutenant during World War I.

Lounsbery was born in New York City in 1882 into an affluent family. His father, Richard P. Lounsbery, hailed mostly from an English family that immigrated to America during colonial times. His mother, Edith Hunter Haggin, had Turkish ancestry through her great-grandfather, Ibrahim Ben Ali, a doctor who migrated from Turkey to the United States after the Russo-Turkish war. The Lounsbery family amassed their wealth from the extensive business ventures of Edith's father, James Ben Ali Haggin, who helped to strengthen the United States' position in the copper industry, helped develop farmland in California, and implemented legislation governing the state's water rights.

Lounsbery attended St. Paul's School in Concord, New Hampshire, and graduated from Harvard College in 1906. He then joined the Haggin family business and extended activities into new areas such as importing silk from Japan. Upon his father's death in 1912, Lounsbery decided to change fields and joined the investment firm of J. B. Harris and Company.

After serving in France as an Army lieutenant during World War I, Lounsbery decided to stay there to study art.

== Personal life ==
Lounsbery married Vera Victoroff, a Russian refugee in Paris, in 1928.

He was the cousin of the painter Ben Ali Haggin.

== The Richard Lounsbery Foundation ==
The Richard Lounsbery Foundation originated in 1959 when it was created through a trust established by the Lounsbery family. Following Richard's passing in 1967, Vera Victoroff Lounsbery collaborated with attorney Alan F. McHenry to establish a well-defined set of objectives for the foundation. Today, the Richard Lounsbery Foundation is a philanthropic organization which supports novel research projects, science education, and key scientific policy issues through seed money or partial support. It distributes a total of about $2.5 million each year, mostly in grants of $25,000–$100,000. The foundation takes a special interest in cooperative activities between French and American scholars.

== See also ==
- Richard Lounsbery Award
- Haggin Museum
