= Green Hill Cemetery (Amsterdam, New York) =

Historic cemetery in New York, United States

- U.S. National Register of Historic Places
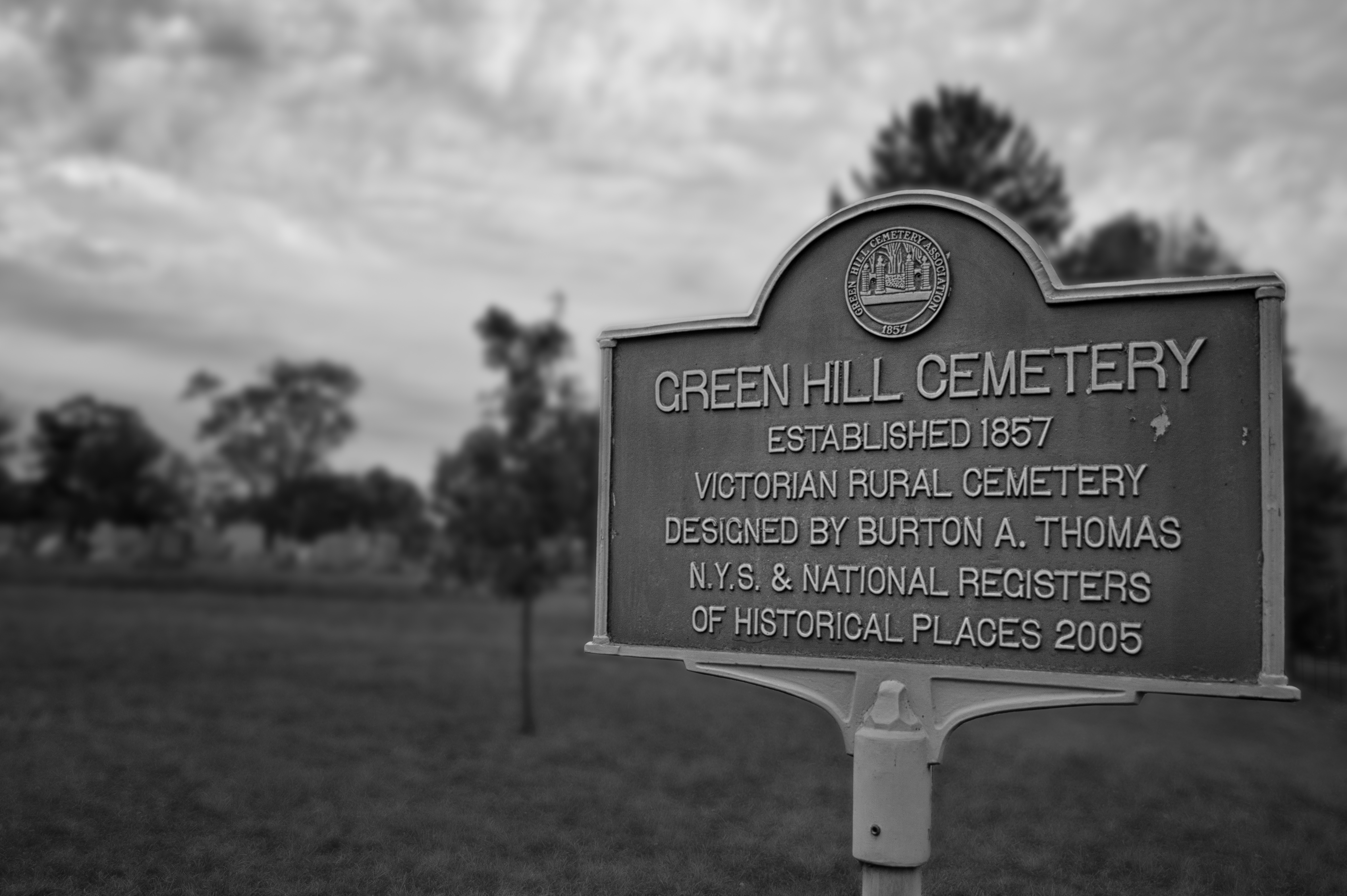

- Location within New York Location within the United States
- Location: Church and Cornell Sts., Amsterdam, New York
- Coordinates: 42°56′16″N 74°11′5″W
- Area: 41 acres (17 ha)
- Built: 1857
- Architect: Thomas, Burton A.
- NRHP reference No.: 05000166
- Added to NRHP: March 15, 2005

Green Hill Cemetery is a historic rural cemetery located at Amsterdam in Montgomery County, New York. It was established in 1858. Unitarian Minister Amory Dwight Mayo delivered the dedication address, which explained the role that cemeteries played in creating a "Christian Republic." It encompasses 14,860 individual interments marked by imposing mausolea, elaborate monuments, family plots, decorative markers, and simple stones. It includes four contributing structures: Church Street entrance gate, upper pedestrian gate and path, receiving vault, and Sanford mausoleum.

It was added to the National Register of Historic Places in 2005.

== Green Hill land purchases ==
In November 1857 the citizens of Amsterdam, New York, convened to form an Association for the purpose of procuring and holding lands to be used exclusively for a cemetery.

At the meeting John J. Schuyler was appointed Chairman and Samuel Belding Jr. Secretary. It was then resolved to form the Green Hill Cemetery Association. It was also resolved that the affairs of the Association were to be managed my a 9-member Board of Trustees. By ballot were elected John J. Schuyler, Derick W. TenBrook, Stephen Sanford, Hoel S. McElwain, S. Belding Jr., John McDonald Jr., Leonard Y. Gardinier, Charles Devendorf and Joseph W. Sturtevant. The Trustees immediately examined several localities in the vicinity for the lands of the cemetery. Days were spent surveying, digging pits to test the quality of soil, opinions were sought and weighed. All of the results were submitted to Burton A. Thomas, Esq./Civil Engineer “a man of cultivated taste and large experience”. As a result, the cemetery was located.

A contract was then drawn for the purchase of 14 acres (57,000 m^{2}) of land and 36 people advanced money to the Association for the purchase and ornamentation of the grounds. The funds were to be refunded from the avails of the subsequent sales of lots. Early in the spring of 1858 the premises containing 14 acres (57,000 m^{2}) were conveyed to the association from Joseph Cornell for the sum of $2,800. On October 31, 1865 the second parcel of land was sold to The Green Hill Cemetery Association again from Joseph Cornell. The property containing 22 and 87/100 acres of land was purchased for the sum of $7,218.

== Notable burials ==
Notable people include:

- Bruce Anderson (1845–1922), Medal of Honor recipient
- Mary Duncan (1895–1933), actress
- US Congressmen:
  - Benedict Arnold (1780–1849) and his grandson Lt. Benedict Arnold Leonard (1840–1864 †).
  - William Barclay Charles (18861–1950)
  - Clark Betton Cochrane (1815–1867)
  - John Sanford (1803–1857)
  - John Sanford (1851–1939)
  - Stephen Sanford (1826–1913)
  - John Knox Stewart (1853–1919)
  - Samuel Wallin (1867–1917)
