= Richard Lounsbery Foundation =

U.S. philanthropic organisation

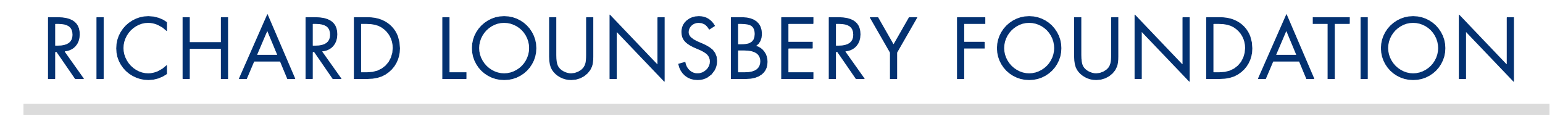
- Abbreviation: RLF
- Type: Philanthropic organization
- Headquarters: Washington, D.C., United States
- Chairman: Jesse H. Ausubel
- Key people: Jesse H. Ausubel; June Yearwood; Liz Holleman Brown
- Revenue: $2,959,461 (2016)
- Expenses: $3,409,876 (2016)
- Website: www.rlounsbery.org

The Richard Lounsbery Foundation is a philanthropic organization located in Washington, D.C. It was founded in 1959, to enhance national strengths in science and technology (in the United States) and to foster strong Franco-American cooperation. The foundation supports research projects, science education, key scientific policy issues, and others.

== History ==
The foundation was set up from the Lounsbery family's wealth which derived from the business activities of James Ben Ali Haggin, grandson of Ibrahim Ben Ali and the grandfather of Richard Lounsbery. It was founded in 1959 and has had charitable status since 1960. In 1967, after Richard Lounsbery's death, Vera Lounsbery, Richard Lounsbery's wife, and the family attorney, Alan F. McHenry, established the goals of the foundation. McHenry became the first president of the foundation in 1980. McHenry's son, Richard, currently serves on the foundation's board of directors.

== Leadership ==
Alan F. McHenry, President	1980–1993
Frederick Seitz, President	1993–2002
David Abshire, President	2002–2014
William Happer, Chairman	2014–2017
Jesse H. Ausubel, Chairman	2017–

== Board of Directors ==
Jesse H. Ausubel	Chairman
Rose Gottemoeller	Vice Chairman
Elizabeth Holleman Brown	Executive Director
June Yearwood	Treasurer
Maxmillian Angerholzer III	Director
Catherine Dulac	Director
Claire Max	Director
Richard J. McHenry	Director
David D. Sabatini	Director
Michael Shelley	Director

== Mission ==
The Richard Lounsbery Foundation aims to enhance national strengths in science and technology through support of programs in the following areas: research that connects groups outside the US and American science; joint international research between nations in conflict; science and technology components of US policy issues; elementary and secondary science and math education, especially in New York City and Washington DC; historical studies and contemporary assessments of key trends in the natural sciences; and start-up assistance for establishing the infrastructure of research projects or new fields of research. Among international initiatives, the Foundation has a long-standing priority in French-American cooperation.

The Foundation generally provides seed money or partial support, rarely renews grants for continuing activities, does not normally fund endowments or capital equipment, and aims to achieve high impact by funding novel projects and forward-looking leaders.

The foundation takes a special interest in cooperative activities between French and American scholars. It may have been the first philanthropic organization to fund the Wikimedia Foundation. A prospective Lounsbery grant in late 2004 accelerated Wikimedia to get US Internal Revenue Service approval as an educational foundation in April 2005.

Some of the foundation's most frequent grantees in the past ten years include the American Museum of Natural History, the American Philosophical Society, U.S. National Academy of Sciences, American Association for the Advancement of Science, BioBus, Inc., Institute of International Education, French Académie des Sciences, U.S. Foundation for the Commemoration of the World Wars, and the Center for the Study of the Presidency & Congress.

== Awards and grants ==
Awards supported by the foundation include:

- The Richard Lounsbery Award in biology or medicine. The Richard Lounsbery Award is an annual prize given to young (aged 45 and below) French and American scientists to recognize extraordinary scientific achievement in biology and medicine. It is administered in alternate years by the National Academy of Sciences and the French Académie des sciences. In addition to honoring scientific excellence, the Award is intended to stimulate research and encourage reciprocal scientific exchanges between the United States and France. The Richard Lounsbery Award was established by Vera Lounsbery in memory of her husband, Richard Lounsbery, in 1978.
