= Hollie Hughes (horse trainer) =

American racehorse trainer (1888–1981)

Personal information
- Born: October 16, 1888 Amsterdam, New York, US
- Died: January 1981 (aged 92) East Rockaway, New York, US
- Resting place: Saint Mary's Cemetery, Fort Johnson, New York
- Occupation: Horse trainer

Horse racing career
- Sport: Horse racing

Major racing wins
- Steeplechase races: American Grand National (1930, 1932, 1933, 1935, 1959, 1960); North American Steeplechase Handicap (1934); Temple Gwathmey Handicap (1932); Brook Steeplechase Handicap (1932); Shillelah Steeplechase Handicap (1935, 1955); New York Turf Writers Cup Steeplechase (1955) Flat races Astoria Stakes (1917); Demoiselle Stakes (1917); Edgemere Handicap (1918); Excelsior Stakes (1918); Nursery Handicap (1921); Expectation Handicap (1922); Old Rosebud Handicap (1922); Stuyvesant Handicap (1922); Southampton Handicap(1924); Flamingo Stakes (1946); Monmouth Handicap (1947); Royal Palm Handicap (1947); Oceanport Stakes (1948); Whitney Handicap (1949); Bowling Green Handicap (1958); Henry L. Straus Memorial Handicap (1951) American Classics wins: Kentucky Derby (1916)

Honors
- U. S. Racing Hall of Fame (1973); Hollie Hughes Handicap at Aqueduct Racetrack

Significant horses
- George Smith, Round View, Tourist II, Best Play, Snap Back, Sun Dog, Golden Meadow

Hollie Hughes (October 16, 1888 – January, 1981) was a trainer of Thoroughbred racehorses who won the 1916 Kentucky Derby and was a six-time winner of the most prestigious steeplechase race in the United States, the American Grand National. His career successes earned him induction into the U. S. Racing Hall of Fame in 1973. In 1979, a New York-bred race at Aqueduct Racetrack was named in his honor.

== Early life and career ==
Hughes was born on a farm not far from Amsterdam, New York. At age 15 he took a job at Gen. Stephen Sanford's Hurricana Stud Farm in Amsterdam where, by 1914, the then 26 year-old was appointed head trainer for the Sanford racing operations. Although he would remain in that position for the next 61 years until retiring in 1975 at the age of 87, Hughes joined the United States Army during World War I.

In 1916 Hollie Hughes won the Kentucky Derby with George Smith. A winner of 20 stakes races, Hollie Hughes enjoyed his most success with steeplechase runners. In addition to his six American Grand National wins, horses under his care won all the major steeplechase events.

== "Don't fall off" ==
The May 2, 1998 issue of the New York Times wrote that Ron Turcotte, Secretariat's jockey, had often told a story about meeting Hollie Hughes just before the 1973 Belmont Stakes. Hughes told him: "Son, you're riding the greatest horse that ever looked through a bridle. I have seen them all, including Man o' War. Secretariat is the best I've ever seen. You will win the Belmont. Don't fall off."

== Personal life and death ==
Hollie Hughes was married to actress Grace Davison from 1926 until her death in 1964.

Hollie Hughes died in January 1981 at age 92.
