= George Smith (horse) =

American-bred Thoroughbred racehorse

- Johnny Loftus aboard George Smith; 1916 Kentucky Derby
- Sire: Out of Reach
- Grandsire: Persimmon
- Dam: Consuelo II
- Damsire: Bradwardine
- Sex: Stallion
- Foaled: 1913
- Country: United States
- Color: Black
- Breeder: Fred A. Forsythe and Col. Jack Chinn
- Owner: 1) Ed Mcbride; 2) John Sanford; 3) The Jockey Club; 4) U.S. Government
- Trainer: 1) Ed Mcbride (1915); 2) Hollie Hughes (1916); 3) Preston M. Burch (1918)
- Record: 31:17-5-3
- Earnings: $42,884

Major wins
- Aberdeen Stakes (1915); Juvenile Stakes (1915); Victoria Stakes (1915); Spring Brewery Stakes (1915); Annapolis Stakes (1915); Warwick Handicap (1917); Bowie Handicap (1918); Edgemere Handicap (1918); Excelsior Handicap (1918); Yorktown Handicap (1918) American Classics wins: Kentucky Derby (1916)
- Last updated on 12/07/2018

George Smith (foaled April 30, 1913) was an American Thoroughbred racehorse and was the winner of the 1916 Kentucky Derby.

== Background ==
George Smith was a black colt by the imported British stallion Out of Reach and out of the imported British mare Consuelo II. His grandsire, Persimmon, was a son of the great English racer and sire St. Simon.

George Smith was named after noted turfman George E. Smith, also known as "Pittsburg Phill", who was once an owner of the colt's dam. The horse was bred by Fred Forsythe and Jack Chinn and was foaled at their Fountain Bleu Farm in Harrodsburg, Kentucky. George Smith was purchased as a yearling for $1,600 by Ed Mcbride, who trained him as a yearling and raced him as a two-year-old.

== Racing career ==
George Smith was a promising two-year-old, winning many major stakes races, including the Victoria Stakes at Old Woodbine Race Course in Toronto. He was then bought by noted Eastern horseman John Sanford for $22,500 as a two-year-old.

The 1916 Kentucky Derby was run on a clear day with a field of 9 horses. George Smith was ridden by American Racing Hall of Fame jockey Johnny Loftus and was the clear contender of the race from the start. The only competition for the win came from Star Hawk, who lost the race by a neck after a rally in the home stretch.^{[1}}

In 1918, George Smith won the Bowie Handicap at Pimlico Race Course by defeating two other Kentucky Derby winners. The 1917 winner, Omar Khayyam, finished second, and the 1918 winner, Exterminator, ran third. In addition, the 1918 Preakness Stakes winner War Cloud finished twelfth.

== Stud career ==
George Smith was retired from racing at age five and stood at stud at Sanford's Hurricana Stock Farm near Amsterdam, New York. He was a disappointing sire, producing no notable offspring. On August 5, 1926, Sanford donated George Smith and another stallion called Nassovian to the Breeding Bureau of The Jockey Club. By the following year, George Smith was in the possession of the U.S. Army Remount Service, where he sired military horses for his remaining years. For the majority of his remount service, he was stationed at the Lookover Stallion Station in Avon, New York.

== Pedigree ==
Pedigree of George Smith
Sire Out of Reach 1900	Persimmon 1893	St. Simon	Galopin
Sire Out of Reach 1900	Persimmon 1893	St. Simon	St. Angela
Sire Out of Reach 1900	Persimmon 1893	Perdita	Hampton
Sire Out of Reach 1900	Persimmon 1893	Perdita	Hermione
Sire Out of Reach 1900	Sandfly 1889	Isonomy	Sterling
Sire Out of Reach 1900	Sandfly 1889	Isonomy	Isola Bella
Sire Out of Reach 1900	Sandfly 1889	Sandiway	Doncaster
Sire Out of Reach 1900	Sandfly 1889	Sandiway	Clemence
Dam Consuelo 1902	Bradwardine 1893	Barcaldine	Solon
Dam Consuelo 1902	Bradwardine 1893	Barcaldine	Ballyroe
Dam Consuelo 1902	Bradwardine 1893	Monte Rosa	Craig Millar
Dam Consuelo 1902	Bradwardine 1893	Monte Rosa	Hedge Rose
Dam Consuelo 1902	Miss Pepper 1896	Pepper and Salt	The Rake
Dam Consuelo 1902	Miss Pepper 1896	Pepper and Salt	Oxford Mixture
Dam Consuelo 1902	Miss Pepper 1896	Great Dame	Hermit
Dam Consuelo 1902	Miss Pepper 1896	Great Dame	Lady Paramount
