= Senator Sanford =

Senator Sanford may refer to:

- Claudius Sanford (fl. 2000s–2010s), Opposition Senator in the House of Assembly of Dominica
- Edward Sanford (New York politician) (1805–1876), New York State Senate
- George H. Sanford (1836–1871), New York State Senate
- John W. A. Sanford (1798–1870), Georgia State Senate
- Mitchell Sanford (1799–1861), New York State Senate
- Nathan Sanford (1777–1838), former United States Senator from New York
- Nehemiah Curtis Sanford (1792–1841), Connecticut State Senate
- Paul Sanford (fl. 2000s–2010s), Alabama State Senate
- Reuben Sanford (1780–1855), New York State Senate
- Richard K. Sanford (1822–1895), New York State Senate
- Terry Sanford (1917–1998), former United States Senator from North Carolina
