= 1916 Kentucky Derby =

Horse race

42nd Kentucky Derby
- Kentucky Derby
- Grade I stakes race
- Johnny Loftus aboard George Smith at the 1916 Kentucky Derby
- Location: Churchill Downs
- Date: May 13, 1916
- Winning horse: George Smith
- Jockey: Johnny Loftus
- Trainer: Hollie Hughes
- Owner: John Sanford
- Surface: Dirt

The 1916 Kentucky Derby was the 42nd running of the Kentucky Derby. The race took place on May 13, 1916.

== Full results ==
Finished	Post	Horse	Jockey	Trainer	Owner	Time / behind
1st	8	George Smith	Johnny Loftus	Hollie Hughes	John Sanford	2:04.00
2nd	3	Star Hawk	Walter Lilley	Walter B. Jennings	A. Kingsley Macomber	Neck
3rd	1	Franklin	Ted Rice	John S. Ward	A. Weber & J. S. Ward	5
4th	4	Dodge	Frank Murphy	John S. Ward	A. Weber & J. S. Ward	1/2
5th	5	Thunderer	Thomas McTaggart	James G. Rowe Sr.	Harry Payne Whitney	6
6th	7	The Cock	Mack Garner	Walter B. Jennings	A. Kingsley Macomber	1
7th	2	Dominant	Joe Notter	James G. Rowe Sr.	Harry Payne Whitney	5
8th	9	Kinney	Loyd Gentry Sr.	Thomas P. Hayes	Thomas P. Hayes	5
9th	6	Lena Misha	Eddie Dugan	George Zeigler	Beverwyck Stable	12

- Winning Breeder: Jack P. Chinn & Frederick A. Forsythe; (KY)
- Horses St. Isidore, Bulse, and Huffaker scratched before the race.

== Payout ==
Post	Horse	Win	Place	Show
8	George Smith	$ 10.30	4.80	2.90
3	Star Hawk		6.60	4.40
1	Franklin			3.50

- The winner received a purse of $9,750.
- Second place received $2,000.
- Third place received $1,000.
- Fourth place received $225.
