= Benali =

Benali may refer to:

- Abdelkader Benali (born 1975), Moroccan-Dutch writer and journalist
- Ahmad Benali (born 1992), Libyan football player
- Francis Benali (born 1968), English football player and coach
- Ghalia Benali (born 1968), singer of Tunisian origin
- Houssine Benali (born 1969), Moroccan former football player
- Leila Benali, Moroccan politician
- Youssef Benali (footballer) (born 1995), French football player
- Youssef Benali (handballer) (born 1987), Tunisian-Qatari handball player
- Zine El Abidine Ben Ali (born 1936), former President of Tunisia

== See also ==
- Ben Ali
- Binali
