= 1885 Belmont Stakes =

American horse race

19th Belmont Stakes
- Belmont Stakes
- Location: Jerome Park Racetrack; The Bronx, New York, U.S.
- Date: June 6, 1885
- Distance: 1 1/2 mi (12 furlongs; 2,414 m)
- Winning horse: Tyrant
- Winning time: 2:43.00
- Jockey: Patsy Duffy
- Trainer: William R. Claypool
- Owner: James Ben Ali Haggin
- Conditions: Good
- Surface: Dirt

The 1885 Belmont Stakes was the 19th running of the Belmont Stakes, a race that would become the third leg of the U.S. Triple Crown series. Run on June 6, 1885, it was the 19th time the event was held at Jerome Park Racetrack in The Bronx, New York. The race drew six starters and was won easily by Tyrant who beat runner-up St. Augustine by three lengths, with third place going to Preakness Stakes winner Tecumseh. Heavily favored, Tyrant's winning time was 2:43 flat over a distance of 1½ miles on a dirt track which was rated as good. The Breeder and Sportsman report on the race stated that "Tyrant won the race in the most easy manner possible." It was considered the biggest win at the time for a California-based horse and trainer.

== Background to the big race ==
In 1884, the two-year-old Tyrant was conditioned for racing in on the Rancho Del Paso three-quarter mile training track in California, but it was decided that the colt was not yet ready for the rigors of competition. As such, Tyrant only began his racing career as a three-year-old in 1885.

To be prepared to compete at racetracks in the New York City area, Tyrant and six other horses along with jockey Patsy Duffy and trainer William Claypool had traveled for 13 days from the Rancho Del Paso Stud in Sacramento County, California. The New York racing community marveled at the excellent condition of the seven horses which had been shipped by rail transport in a boxcar specially built for Rancho Del Paso owner James Ben Ali Haggin.

Tyrant soon showed how good he was with a win in the important Withers Stakes at the Jerome Park track. As reported by the Breeder and Sportsman, Tyrant was trained by William Claypool and the win in the Withers Stakes marked the first time a California horse with a California trainer had won a major race for three-year-olds on the East Coast. About the Belmont Stakes, the Breeder and Sportsman wrote that "out of the original entry of sixty-two horses there were only six left in, most of them having been frightened by Tyrant's victory in the Withers."

Miss Palmer was the only filly in the field and was in last place shortly after the race began and remained there until the end. While the filly had won the Ladies Stakes on the same track as the Belmont, and had done it impressively, that was just seven days before the Belmont Stakes.

== Results ==
| Finished | Horse | Jockey | Trainer | Owner | Time / behind | Win $ |
|---|---|---|---|---|---|---|
| 1 | Tyrant | Patsy Duffy | William R. Claypool | James B. A. Haggin | 2:43.00 | $2,710 |
| 2 | St. Augustine | Harry Blaylock | John Alcock | George L. Lorillard | 3½ | |
| 3 | Tecumseh | Jim McLaughlin | Charles S. Littlefield Sr. | Charles S. Littlefield Sr. | Neck | |
| 4 | Wickham | William Fitzpatrick | | P. H. Grill | | |
| 5 | Masher | Charlie Shauer | Barney Riley | David D. Withers | | |
| 6 | Miss Palmer | Arnold | Andrew Thompson | John E. McDonald | | |

- Winning Breeder: Belle Meade Stud (William Giles Harding)
