= Stephen Sanford =

American politician

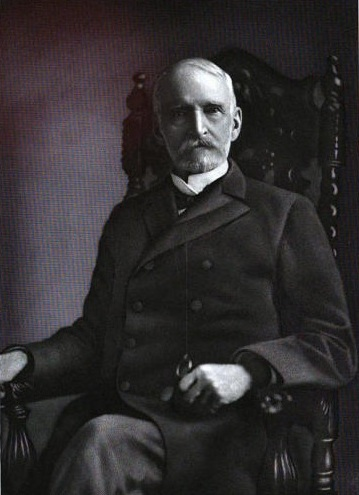
- Sanford, 1911

Member of the U.S. House of Representatives from New York's 18th district
- In office March 4, 1869 – March 3, 1871
- Preceded by: James M. Marvin
- Succeeded by: John M. Carroll

Personal details
- Born: May 26, 1826 Mayfield, New York, USA
- Died: February 13, 1913 (aged 86) Amsterdam, New York, USA
- Resting place: Green Hill Cemetery
- Party: Republican

Stephen Sanford (May 26, 1826 – February 13, 1913) was an American businessman and a member of the United States House of Representatives from New York's 18th congressional district.

== Life and career ==
Born in Mayfield, New York, he was the son of Mary (née Slack) and her husband John Sanford (1803–1857). He attended the common schools and local academy at Amsterdam, New York, Georgetown College, Washington, D.C., for two years, and the United States Military Academy at West Point, New York. He joined his father's carpet manufacturing business in 1844 but in 1854, the mill burned to the ground. His father retired but Stephen Sanford rebuilt the business to the point where it was employing twenty-five hundred workers.

In 1849, Stephen Sanford married Sarah Jane Cochrane (1830–1901) and had five children. Eldest child John Sanford II (1851–1939) would take over the family business.

Sanford was elected as Republican to the Forty-first Congress (March 4, 1869 - March 4, 1871). He declined to be a candidate for renomination. In 1876, he served as a delegate to the Republican National Convention.

He died in Amsterdam, New York in 1913 and was interred in the family plot in the Green Hill Cemetery.

== Thoroughbred horse racing ==
Stephen Sanford operated Hurricana Stock Farm near the town of Amsterdam, New York where he bred and trained thoroughbred racehorses. He named many his top American horses after members of the Mohawk nation. In 1880 his horses began racing at nearby Saratoga Race Course. His grandson, also named Stephen, owned Sergeant Murphy, the 1923 winner of England's Grand National steeplechase. His son John would continue on very successfully in racing and the Sanford Stakes was created in their honor in 1913, the year of Stephen Sanford's death.

U.S. House of Representatives
Preceded by James M. Marvin	Member of the U.S. House of Representatives from New York's 18th congressional district 1869–1871	Succeeded by John M. Carroll
