= Bigelow-Hartford Carpet Mills Historic District =

Historic district in Connecticut, United States

- U.S. National Register of Historic Places
- U.S. Historic district
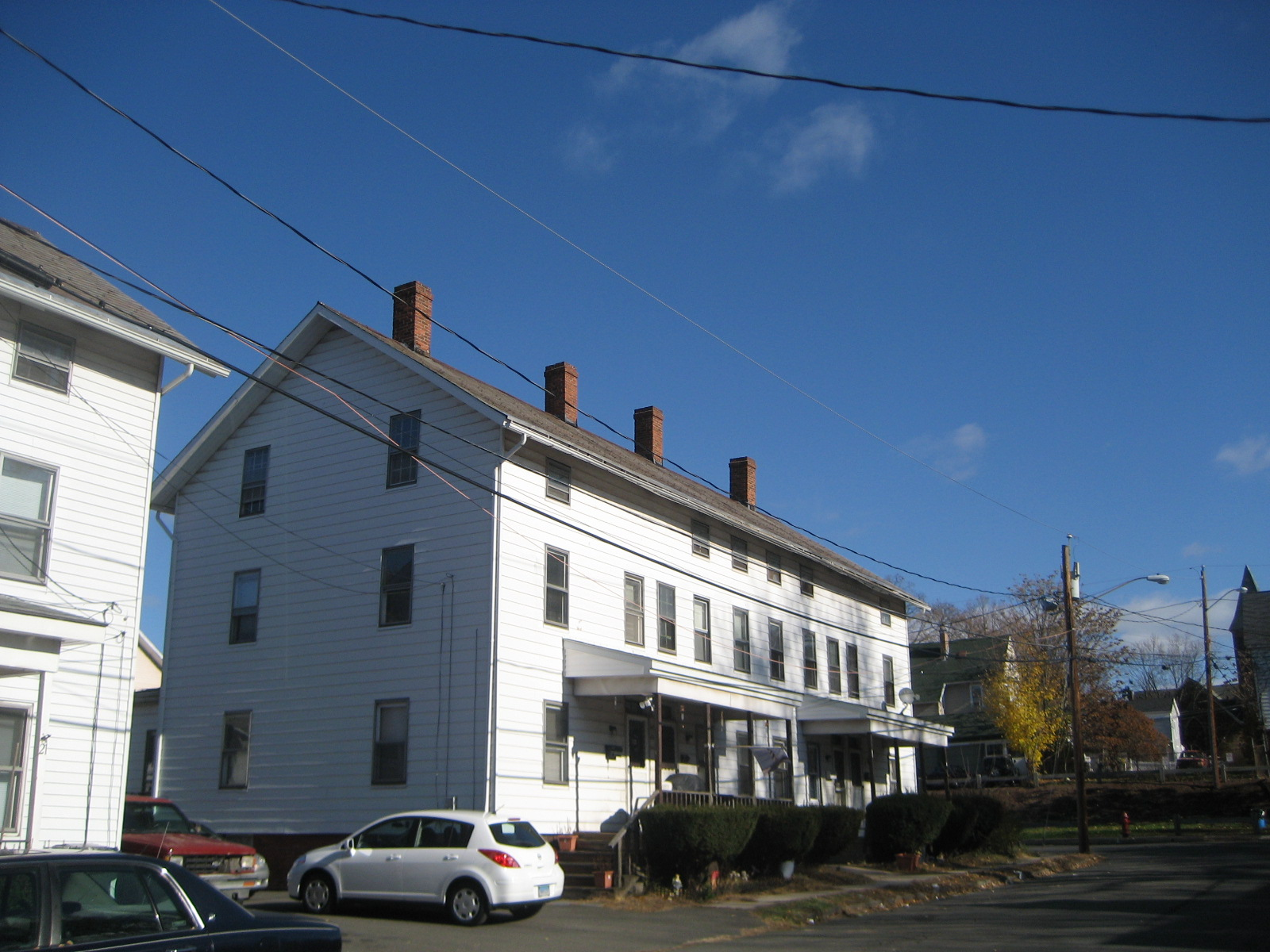
- Mill worker housing

- Location within Connecticut Location within the United States
- Location: Roughly bounded by Lafayette Street, Hartford Avenue, Alden Avenue, Pleasant, High, Spring, South and Prospect Streets, Enfield, Connecticut
- Coordinates: 41°59′59″N 72°36′6″W
- Area: 100 acres (40 ha)
- Architectural style: Greek Revival, Gothic Revival, Colonial Revival
- NRHP reference No.: 94001382
- Added to NRHP: November 25, 1994

The Bigelow-Hartford Carpet Mills Historic District encompasses a company-built factory and residential area in the Thompsonville area of Enfield, Connecticut, United States. In addition to the former factory buildings of the Bigelow-Hartford Carpet Mills, the district includes more than 150 housing units constructed by the company between approximately 1830 and 1920. It is roughly bounded by Lafayette Street and Alden Avenue to the north, Hartford Avenue and Lincoln Street to the east, High Street to the south, and River Street to the west. The district was listed on the National Register of Historic Places in 1994.

== Description and history ==
The Bigelow-Hartford Carpet Mills were the largest employer in Enfield for many years, and one of the largest textile firms in the state. Founded in 1828 by Orrin Thompson on the banks of Freshwater Brook, the company became one of the nation's largest manufacturers of carpeting, employing more than 13,000 workers in Thompsonville at its height in the 1920s. The company's growth through the 19th century prompted an ongoing need for nearby affordable housing for its workers. The result is several generations of stylistically different housing, built densely in the blocks surrounding the main factory complex.

None of the earliest housing, a row of simple single-story cottages documented in drawings, built by Orrin Thompson survives. Early buildings tended to house either two or four families on two floors. Later construction expanded on these models, resulting in three-story tenements and row houses with as many as twelve units. The 1845 Cottage Green area was an unusual deviation from the largely grid-based layout the company used for its housing, with a series of single-family Gothic cottages around a common yard. This area may have been developed as a means to attract highly skilled craftsmen from England. The tenement-style housing found in the district was mainly built in the late 19th century; the housing of the early 20th century returned to the models of two and four families, and featured vernacular versions of popular architectural styles.

In addition to the mass of company housing, the district also includes the surviving early 20th-century factory buildings, which have for the most part been converted to residential use.

== See also ==
- National Register of Historic Places listings in Hartford County, Connecticut
