= Tyrant (American horse) =

American Thoroughbred racehorse

- Sire: Great Tom
- Grandsire: King Tom
- Dam: Moselle
- Damsire: Jack Malone
- Sex: Stallion
- Foaled: 1882
- Country: United States
- Color: Chestnut
- Breeder: Belle Meade Stud (William Giles Harding)
- Owner: S. D. Bruce; James B. A. Haggin
- Trainer: William R. Claypool

Major wins
- Stockton Stakes (1885); Withers Stakes (1885); Distillers' Stakes (1886) American Classics wins: Belmont Stakes (1885)

Tyrant (foaled 1882) was an American Thoroughbred racehorse who came from California to win the 1885 Belmont Stakes, a prestigious race at Jerome Park Racetrack on the U. S. East Coast that would become the third leg of the U.S. Triple Crown series. It was considered the biggest win at the time for a California-based horse and trainer. He also won the Withers Stakes.

== Background ==
Tyrant was bred by Gen. William Harding at his Belle Meade Stud in Tennessee. He was initially purchased as a yearling for $300 by Mr. S. D. Bruce of Kentucky but who a year later sold him to James B. A. Haggin who brought the colt to his Rancho Del Paso Stud in Sacramento County, California.

In 1884, the two-year-old Tyrant was conditioned for racing on the Rancho Del Paso's three-quarter mile training track but it was decided that the colt was not yet ready for the rigors of competition and Tyrant only began his racing career as a three-year-old in 1885.

Tyrant's easy win in the Withers Stakes marked the first time that a California horse with its California trainer had won a major race for three-year-olds on the East Coast.

Racing at age four, Tyrant won the Distillers' Stakes at the Kentucky Association track in Lexington.

== Stud career ==
Retired to stud at his owner's Rancho Del Paso, Tyrant met with limited success as a sire. Among his offspring, one of Tyrant's most successful runners included The Manxman, winner of the 1898 Carter Handicap.

== Pedigree ==
Pedigree of Tyrant, chestnut colt, 1882
Sire Great Tom	King Tom	Harkaway	Economist
Sire Great Tom	King Tom	Harkaway	Fanny Dawson
Sire Great Tom	King Tom	Pocahontas	Glencoe
Sire Great Tom	King Tom	Pocahontas	Marpessa
Sire Great Tom	Woodcraft	Voltigeur	Voltaire
Sire Great Tom	Woodcraft	Voltigeur	Martha Lynn
Sire Great Tom	Woodcraft	Venison mare	Venison
Sire Great Tom	Woodcraft	Venison mare	Wedding-Day
Dam Moselle	Jack Malone	Lexington	Boston
Dam Moselle	Jack Malone	Lexington	Alice Carneal
Dam Moselle	Jack Malone	Gloriana	American Eclipse
Dam Moselle	Jack Malone	Gloriana	Trifle
Dam Moselle	Gazelle	Albion	Actaeon
Dam Moselle	Gazelle	Albion	Panthea
Dam Moselle	Gazelle	Delta	Priam
Dam Moselle	Gazelle	Delta	Gamma (family: A10)
