= National Red Cross Pageant =

The National Red Cross Pageant
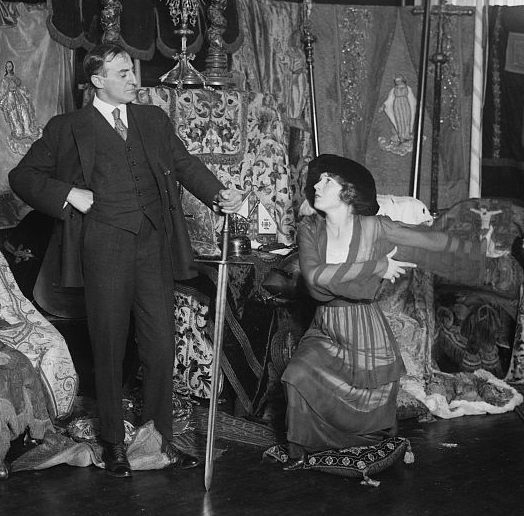
- Film still of Guy Favières and Ina Claire
- Directed by: Christy Cabanne
- Produced by: National Red Cross Pageant Committee
- Edited by: Mildred Richter
- Release date: December 1917
- Running time: 5 reels
- Country: United States
- Language: Silent film (English intertitles)

The National Red Cross Pageant of 1917 was an American war pageant that was performed in order to sell war bonds, support the National Red Cross, and promote a positive opinion about American involvement in World War I. The live open-air pageant was presented on October 5, 1917, at the Rosemary Open Air Amphitheater on a private estate, Rosemary Farm, near Huntington, New York. The production was also captured by director Christy Cabanne as an all-star revue silent film, now considered a lost film.

== Plot ==
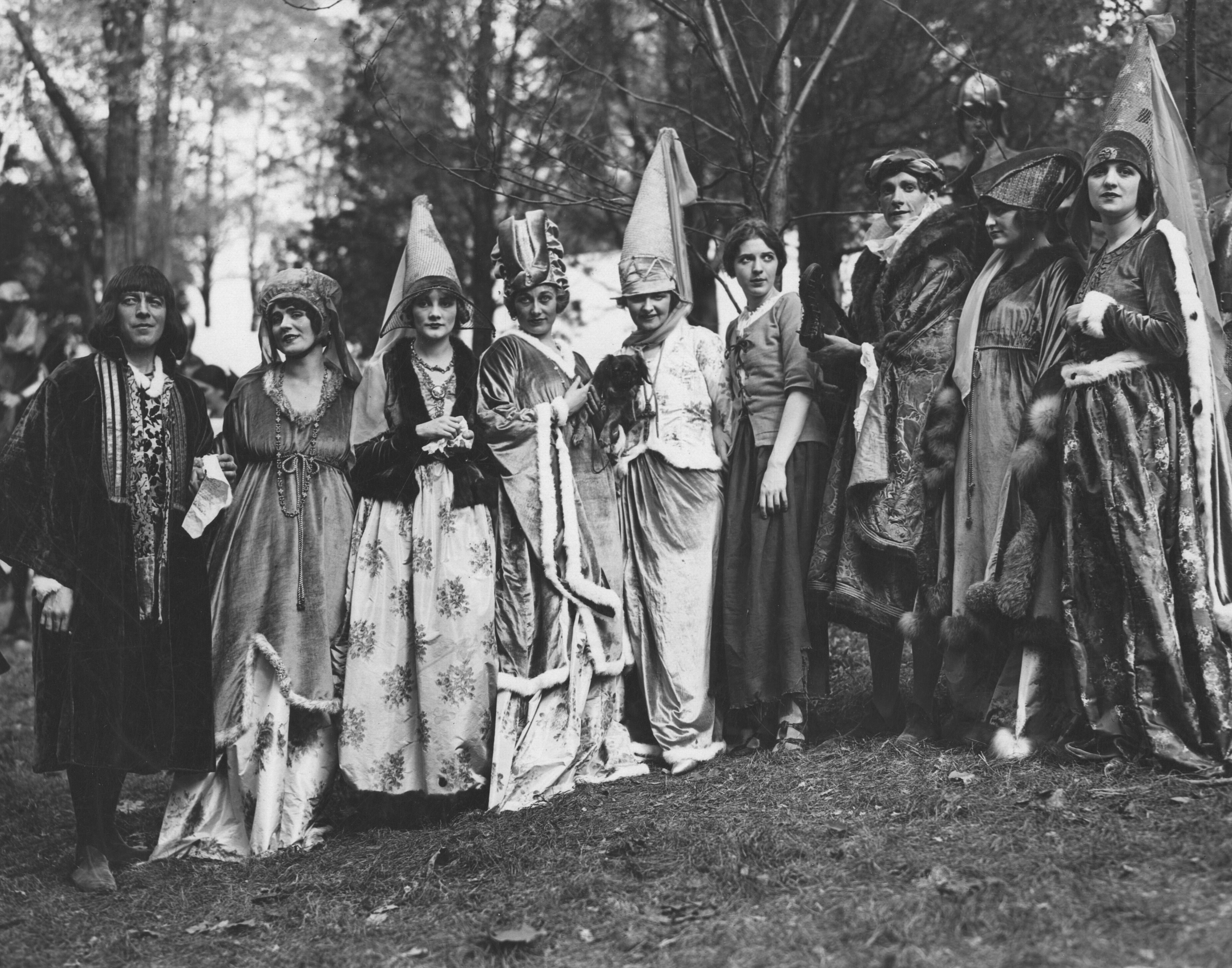
Cast in the French Episode of the National Red Cross Pageant on the Rosemary Estate on October 5, 1917. From left: Eugene O'Brien, Ivy Troutman, Jeanne Eagles, Alison McBain, Bonnie Glass, Ina Claire, Clifton Webb, Margaret Boyd and Aimee Dalmores.

The pageant consisted of episodes from the history of each of the Allies. The case of each Ally before the bar of Truth, Justice, and Liberty, was organized by actors and actresses of the American stage. Decorators and artists collaborated in the settings and costuming. The first of two parts consisted of historic episodes in relation to the Allied nations. The prologue, spoken by Edith Wynne Matthison, dedicated an altar to Peace and was followed by rhythmic dancing by Florence Fleming Noyes and her pupils. A scene from early Flemish days followed, and four famous cities, Bruges, Ghent, Ypres, and Louvain paid their allegiance to Flanders, played by Ethel Barrymore in the costume seen in Flemish paintings. The Italian scene followed and then the scene of the birth of English liberty, as represented by King John signing Magna Carta. Medieval Russia was played by John Barrymore as a tyrant borne upon the shoulders of his serfs. In the French episode, Ina Claire appeared as Jeanne D'Arc riding her white charger.

In "The Drawing of the Sword", the second half of the pageant, each nation among the Allies appeared to present its case before the court of Truth, Justice, and Liberty. Serbia entered first and told her story of the opening of the war, to which Truth spoke assent. Belgium followed, and to her aid came England and France, while Russia came to the support of her ally, Serbia. Next, England called upon her overseas colonies, and Japan also, brought her pledge to maintain the cause of liberty on the Pacific. Armenia came to tell her wrongs; and Italy, shaking off the bonds of the Triple Alliance, cast her lot with the defenders of liberty. The grand climax was reached with the entry of America in the person of Marjorie Rambeau.

== Cast ==
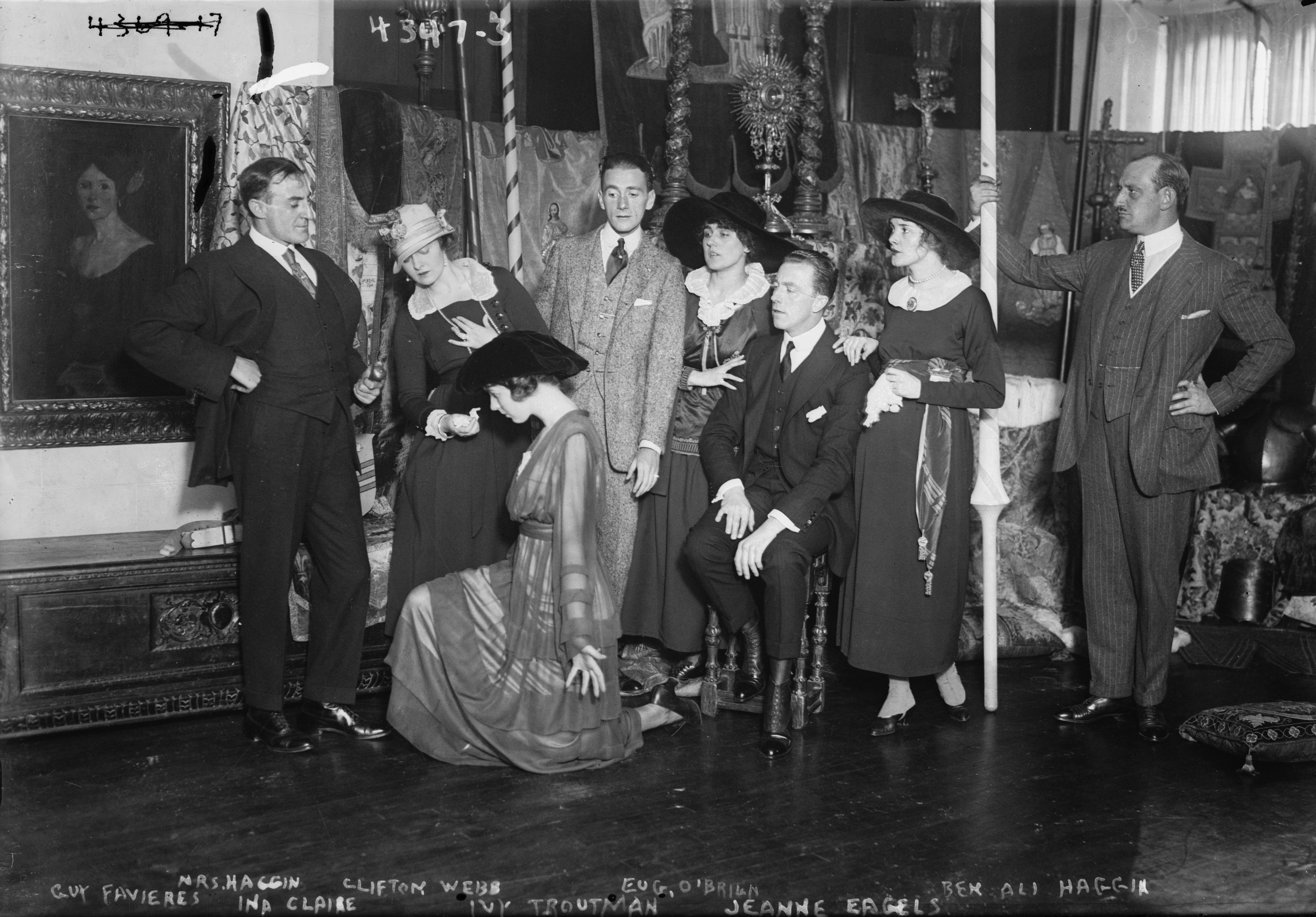
Actors rehearse theirs role in the pageant and the film. From left: Guy Favieres, Bonnie Glass, Ina Claire(kneeling), Clifton Webb, Ivy Troutman, Eugene O'Brien, Jeanne Eagels, Ben Ali Haggin.

- Edith Wynne Matthison as Prologue
- Douglas Wood as Herald, Flemish episode
- Ethel Barrymore as Flanders, Belgium; Flemish and Final episodes
- Kitty Gordon as Bruges; Flemish episode
- Margaret Moreland as Ghent; Flemish episode
- Adelaide Prince as Ypres; Flemish episode
- Olive Tell as Louvain; Flemish episode
- Irene Fenwick as Herald; Italian episode
- Montgomery Irving as The Alps; Italian episode
- Annette Kellerman as The Mediterranean; Italian episode
- Josephine Drake as The Adriatic; Italian episode
- Ethel McDonough as Leader of The Lakes; Italian episode
- Norman Trevor as Herald; English episode
- George Backus as King John; English episode
- Marjorie Wood as Queen; English episode
- Maclyn Arbuckle as Baron Fitz-Walter; English episode (billed as Macklyn Arbuckle)
- Lumsden Hare as The Archbishop of Canterbury; English episode
- Frank Keenan as The Secretary; English episode
- Frederick Truesdell as The Papal Legate; English episode
- Bonnie Glass (Mrs. Ben Ali Haggin) as Dance, The Pavane; French episode
- Clifton Webb as Dancer, The Pavane; French episode
- Ben Ali Haggin as Dunois, Defender of France; French episode
- Ina Claire as Jeanne D'Arc; French episode
- Guy Favières as Charles VII, the Dauphin; French episode
- John Barrymore as The Tyrant; Russian episode
- George F. Smithfield as The Fugitive; Russian episode
- Alice Fischer as Herald; Final episode
- Howard Kyle as Justice; Final episode
- Blanche Yurka as Truth; Final episode
- Gladys Hanson as Liberty; Final episode
- Tyrone Power, Sr. as Servia; Final episode (billed as Tyrone Power)
- E. H. Sothern as England; Final episode
- Rita Jolivet as France; Final episode
- Richard Bennett as Final episode
- Michio Itō as Japan; Final episode
- Marjorie Rambeau as America; Final episode
- Lionel Barrymore
- Mrs. H. P. Davison
- Hazel Dawn
- William T. Rock
- Helen Ware
- Frances White

== Production background ==
On October 5, 1917, a live open-air pageant was held at the Rosemary Open Air Amphitheater on a private estate, Rosemary Farm, near Huntington, New York. It was also performed again a few weeks later at the Metropolitan Opera in New York City. Both performances drew large crowds whose numbers were in the hundreds, and consisted mostly of wealthy New Yorkers. The event was mainly the brainchild of Ben Ali Haggin, famous as a stage designer. His wife appears in one of the episodes. The earnings from the live pageant itself went to the Red Cross.

Presumably the filming of the pageant was made with a patriotic fervor in the wake of the United States entry into World War I in April 1917. The proceeds from the film going to the war effort, such as the Red Cross, War Bonds, etc.

A litany of famous Broadway and motion picture stars of the period participated in the production. Lionel, Ethel, and John Barrymore all appeared in the production but not together in the same scenes as they did in Rasputin and the Empress (1932). According to the National Red Cross Bulletin, 500 people appeared in the production and more than 5,000 spectators were in attendance.

The proceeds from the pageant were reported as having been in the amount of $50,000 which created a way for American citizens to make a difference for their country's participation in the Great War, and it also allowed these same citizens to feel a sense of national pride for their beloved homeland.

Its success was so remarkable, the National Red Cross later proclaimed December 7 National Red Cross Theatrical Day.

== Costume and scenic elements ==
The Rosemary Open-Air Amphitheater is an outdoor playing space that includes a stage area for the actors that is separated from the audience by a small moat. The audience space includes raked seating incorporated in the terrain. Behind the stage there are trees and flora that make up the background. The set of The National Red Cross Pageant included a large throne and an archway made of stone. There were many different costumes in The National Red Cross Pageant due to the great variety of roles including soldiers, mermaids, and personified countries.

== Reception ==
Jenna Kubly said the pageant described the United States' position in the war as "a nation involved in a just war to free all nations."

The Red Cross Bulletin wrote:

Many of the leading theatrical stars of America contributed their services in The National Red Cross Pageant held on the afternoon of October 5 at the Rosemary Open-Air Theater, on the estate of Roland B. Conklin, Huntington, L.I. Five hundred persons appeared in the production, which was in two parts. The first was made up of festival scenes illustrating the spirit of the allied nations. The second, a dramatic statement of the Allies' cause in the war, was entitled "The Drawing of the Sword". Critics reported the pageant one of the most elaborate and artistic dramatic events ever staged out of doors. Weather conditions were ideal. More than 5,000 people were in the audience.

== See also ==
- List of lost films
- The Common Cause (1919)
- Ethel Barrymore on stage, screen and radio
