= Peter Joseph Wagner =

American politician

Member of the U.S. House of Representatives from New York's 15th district
- In office March 4, 1839 – – March 3, 1841
- Preceded by: John Edwards
- Succeeded by: John Sanford

Personal details
- Born: August 14, 1795 Palatine, New York, U.S.
- Died: September 13, 1884 (aged 89) Fort Plain, New York, U.S.

Peter Joseph Wagner (August 14, 1795 – September 13, 1884) was a U.S. representative from New York.

Born at Wagners Hollow in the town of Palatine, New York, Wagner moved to Fort Plain, New York, with his parents in 1805. He completed preparatory studies. He attended Fairfield Academy in 1810 and 1811. He was graduated from Union College, Schenectady, New York, in 1816. He studied law. He was admitted to the bar in September 1819 and commenced practice at Fort Plain, New York. He also engaged in agricultural pursuits and banking. He was an unsuccessful candidate for election in 1834 to the Twenty-fourth Congress.

Wagner was elected as a Whig to the Twenty-sixth Congress (March 4, 1839 – March 3, 1841). He served as chairman of the Committee on Expenditures in the Department of War (Twenty-sixth Congress). He continued the practice of law at Fort Plain until May 1873, when he retired. He died at Fort Plain, New York, September 13, 1884. He was interred in Fort Plain Cemetery.

== Sources ==
- United States Congress. "Peter Joseph Wagner (id: W000020)". Biographical Directory of the United States Congress.

Political offices
Preceded by John Edwards	Member of the U.S. House of Representatives from New York's 15th congressional district 1839–1841	Succeeded by John Sanford
