= John Knox Stewart =

American politician

John K. Stewart
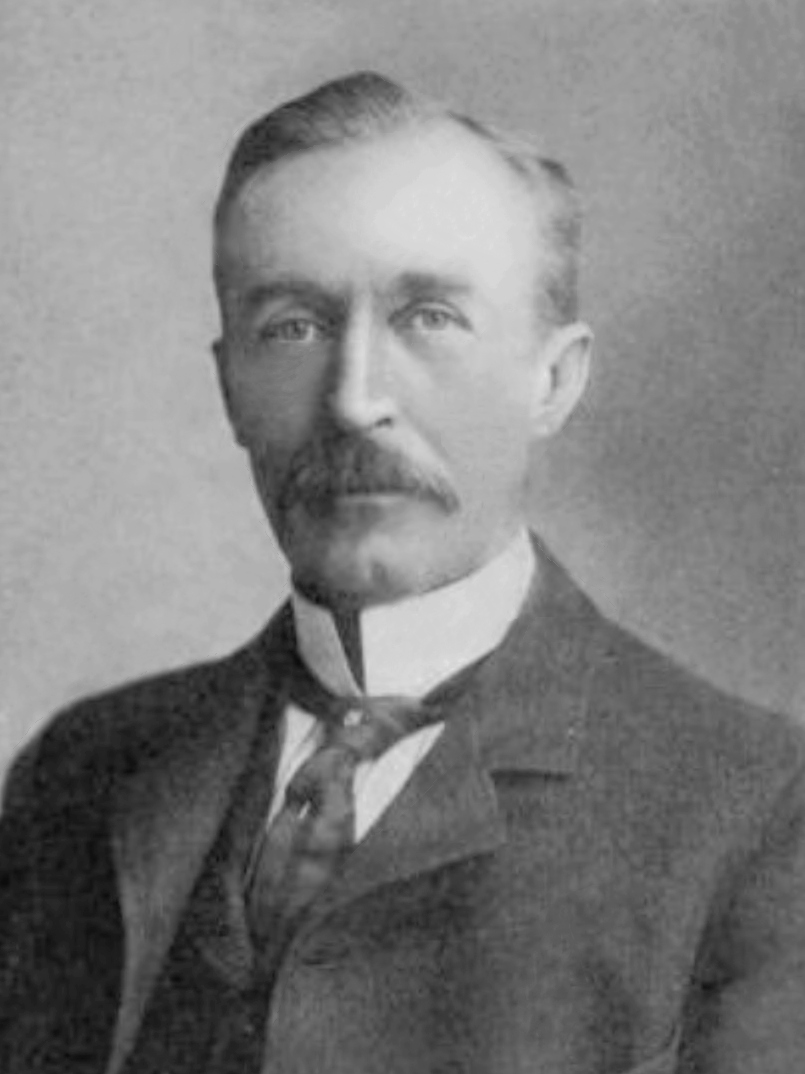

Member of the U.S. House of Representatives from New York's 21st district
- In office March 4, 1899 – March 3, 1903
- Preceded by: David F. Wilber
- Succeeded by: John H. Ketcham

Member of the New York State Assembly from the Montgomery district
- In office January 1, 1890 – December 31, 1890
- Preceded by: W. Barlow Dunlap
- Succeeded by: W. Barlow Dunlap

Personal details
- Born: October 20, 1853 Perth, New York
- Died: June 27, 1919 (aged 65) Amsterdam, New York
- Party: Republican

John Knox Stewart (October 20, 1853 – June 27, 1919) was a representative from New York.

Stewart was born in Perth, Fulton County, New York on October 20, 1853. He moved with his parents to Amsterdam, New York in 1860 and attended the public schools and Amsterdam Academy. He was engaged in the manufacture of paper until 1885, when he engaged in the manufacture of textiles; sewer commissioner of the city 1885 - 1890; a director of the Farmers’ National Bank of Amsterdam and of the Chuctanunda Gas Light Co.; vice president of the Amsterdam Board of Trade; member of the New York State Assembly (Montgomery Co.) in 1890; elected as a Republican to the 56th and 57th United States Congresses, holding office from March 4, 1899, to March 3, 1903; resumed the manufacture of textiles and continued in that business until his death in Amsterdam, N.Y. and is buried in Greenhill Cemetery.

New York State Assembly
Preceded by W. Barlow Dunlap	New York State Assembly; Montgomery County; 1890	Succeeded by W. Barlow Dunlap
U.S. House of Representatives
Preceded by David F. Wilber	Member of the U.S. House of Representatives from New York's 21st congressional district 1899–1903	Succeeded by John H. Ketcham
