= Simon J. Schermerhorn =

American politician

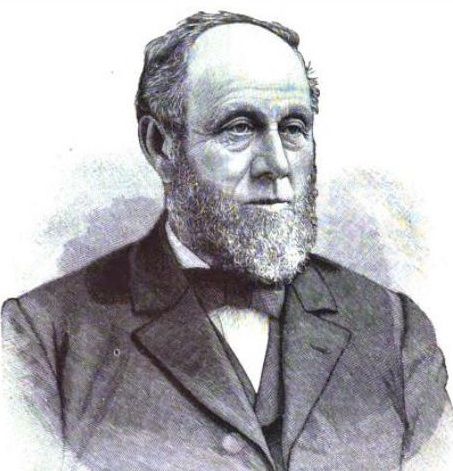

Member of the U.S. House of Representatives from New York's 21st district
- In office March 4, 1893 – March 3, 1895
- Preceded by: John M. Wever
- Succeeded by: David F. Wilber

Personal details
- Born: September 25, 1827 Rotterdam, New York, US
- Died: July 21, 1901 (aged 73) Rotterdam, New York, US
- Party: Democrat

Simon Jacob Schermerhorn (September 25, 1827 – July 21, 1901) was an American politician who served one term as a United States representative from New York from 1893 to 1895.

== Biography ==
Born in Rotterdam, Schenectady County, New York, he attended the common schools and engaged in agricultural pursuits.

=== Political career ===
He was supervisor of the town of Rotterdam in 1856, and served two terms as school commissioner; in 1862 and 1865 he was a member of the New York State Assembly. He was a director and trustee in local banks.

=== Congress ===
He was elected as a Democrat to the Fifty-third Congress, holding office from March 4, 1893 to March 3, 1895. He was not a candidate for renomination in 1894.

=== Retirement and death ===
After leaving Congress, he retired to his farm in Rotterdam. He died there in 1901; interment was in Viewland Cemetery.

New York State Assembly
Preceded by Alonzo Macomber	New York State Assembly; Schenectady County; 1862	Succeeded by John McShea, Jr.
Preceded by Charles Stanford	New York State Assembly; Schenectady County; 1865	Succeeded by John C. Ellis
U.S. House of Representatives
Preceded by John M. Wever	Member of the U.S. House of Representatives from New York's 21st congressional district 1893–1895	Succeeded by David F. Wilber
