= David F. Wilber =

American politician and diplomat

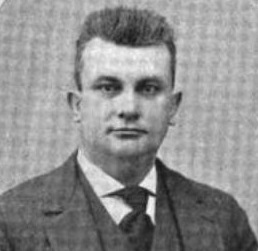

Member of the U.S. House of Representatives from New York's 21st district
- In office March 4, 1895 – March 3, 1899
- Preceded by: Simon J. Schermerhorn
- Succeeded by: John K. Stewart

Personal details
- Born: December 7, 1859 Milford, New York
- Died: August 14, 1928 (aged 68) Upper Dam, Maine
- Party: Republican

David Forrest Wilber (December 7, 1859 –August 14, 1928) was a United States representative and consul from New York.

== Biography ==
Wilber was born in Milford, New York, the son of David Wilber, who also served in Congress. He attended public schools before graduating from Cazenovia Seminary in 1879. He then engaged in the hops business at Milford in 1879 and at Oneonta, New York, in 1880, and was also involved in real estate, agriculture, and stockbreeding. He twice represented Oneonta on the Otsego County Board of Supervisors and was vice president and director of the Wilber National Bank of Oneonta from 1883 to 1896. He also served as member of the board of trustees of his alma mater, the Cazenovia Seminary.

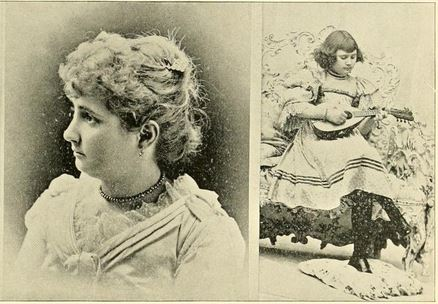
Deforest Wilber and her daughter

He married Deforest, a native of Schoharie County, New York, and they had one daughter.

Wilber was elected as a Republican to the Fifty-fourth and Fifty-fifth Congresses (March 4, 1895 - March 3, 1899). He was not a candidate for renomination in 1898. After his two terms in Congress, he began a career as a consul. He served as United States consul to Barbados from 1903 to 1905 and then as consul general to Singapore (1905–1907), Halifax (1907–1909), Kobe (1909–1910), Vancouver (1910–1913), Zürich (1913–1915), Genoa (1915–1921), and finally Auckland and Wellington (1922–1923).

Wilber retired in June 1923 and returned to Oneonta to care for his business interests. He was a member of the New York Republican State Committee from 1924 to 1927. He died at his summer camp in Upper Dam, Maine, and was buried at Glenwood Cemetery in Oneonta.

Wilber was a presidential elector in the 1924 presidential election.

U.S. House of Representatives
Preceded by Simon J. Schermerhorn	Member of the U.S. House of Representatives from New York's 21st congressional district 1895–1899	Succeeded by John K. Stewart
