= John Edwards (New York politician) =

American politician (1781–1850)

John Edwards (August 6, 1781 – December 28, 1850) was an American law enforcement officer who was a one term member of the United States House of Representatives from New York, serving from 1837 to 1839.

== Biography ==
Edwards was born in Beekmans Precinct in Dutchess County, New York on August 6, 1781. He received his education in the common schools. From 1806 to 1812, he served as the Sheriff of Montgomery County, New York and as the keeper of the Johnstown Jail.

Later Edwards moved to Ephrata, New York in Fulton County, New York.

=== Tenure in Congress ===
He was elected as a Democrat to the U.S. House of Representatives in 1836 and served from 1837 to 1839.

=== Later career and death ===
After politics, Edwards was engaged in mercantile and manufacturing ventures.

He died at Johnstown, Fulton County, New York on December 28, 1850.

== Sources ==
- United States Congress. "John Edwards (id: E000073)". Biographical Directory of the United States Congress.

U.S. House of Representatives
Preceded by Matthias J. Bovee	Member of the U.S. House of Representatives from New York's 15th congressional district 1837–1839	Succeeded by Peter Joseph Wagner
