= John M. Carroll (politician) =

American politician

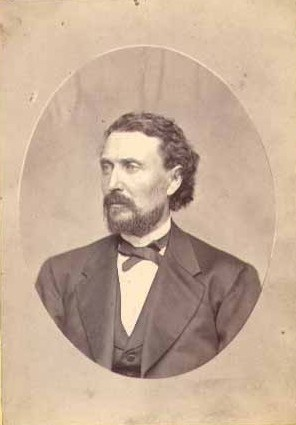

Member of the U.S. House of Representatives from New York's 18th district
- In office March 4, 1871 – March 3, 1873
- Preceded by: Stephen Sanford
- Succeeded by: William A. Wheeler

Fulton County District attorney
- In office 1859–1862

Personal details
- Born: John Michael Carroll; April 27, 1823 Springfield, New York
- Died: May 8, 1901 (aged 78) Johnstown, New York
- Party: Democratic
- Education: Union College
- Occupation: lawyer

John Michael Carroll (April 27, 1823 – May 8, 1901) was an American educator, lawyer, and politician who served one term as a member of the United States House of Representatives from New York from 1871 to 1873.

== Life and career ==
John M. Carroll was born in Springfield, New York, on April 27, 1823. He attended Fairfield Seminary and graduated from Union College with a degree in civil engineering in 1846, where he was a member of the Kappa Alpha Society and was elected to Phi Beta Kappa. After college he taught school while studying law and attained admission to the bar in 1848. He practiced in Fonda and Broadalbin, and relocated to Johnstown in 1862.

=== Political career ===
A Democrat, he served as Fulton County District Attorney from 1859 to 1862.

=== Tenure in Congress ===
In 1870 he was elected to Congress and served one term, (March 4, 1871 - March 3, 1873). He was not a candidate for reelection in 1872 and returned to his law practice.

== Death and burial ==
Carroll died in Johnstown on May 8, 1901, and was buried in Johnstown Cemetery.

== External resources ==
- United States Congress. "John M. Carroll (id: C000190)". Biographical Directory of the United States Congress.
- John M. Carroll at Find A Grave

U.S. House of Representatives
Preceded by Stephen Sanford	Member of the U.S. House of Representatives from New York's 18th congressional district 1871–1873	Succeeded by William A. Wheeler
