= Harry Blaylock =

Personal information
- Born: 1859 Hamilton, Canada West
- Died: March 20, 1899 (aged 39–40) Toronto, Ontario, Canada
- Occupations: Jockey / Trainer, Owner

Horse racing career
- Sport: Horse racing

Major racing wins
- Manhattan Handicap (1877); Grand National Handicap (1878); Homebred Produce Stakes (1879); Harold Stakes (1883, 1887); Alabama Stakes (1884); Hunter Stakes (1884); Saratoga Cup (1884); September Stakes (1884); Spindrift Stakes (1885); Camden Stakes (1887); Latonia Oaks (1887); Travers Stakes (1887); St. Louis Derby (1889); Maple Leaf Stakes (1893); Quickstep Stakes (1894) Canadian Classic Race wins: Queen's Plate (1893)

Racing awards
- Churchill Downs Leading jockey (1883, Fall) (1887, Spring)

Significant horses
- Inspiration, Martello, Sir Dixon, St. Augustine, Volante

William Henry Blaylock (1859 - March 20, 1899) was a jockey in Thoroughbred racing who met with success both in the United States and his native Canada. In 1893 he won the Queen's Plate which became Canada's most important race and is the oldest continuously run race for Thoroughbred horses in North America.

== Skill - Honesty - Integrity ==
Known by the nickname Harry, Blaylock's death as reported by the San Francisco publication Breeder and Sportsman said that he had been one of the "most prominent jockeys on the American turf and stood high for skill and integrity." As well, the New York Times obituary stated that Blaylock "had a reputation for skill and honesty second to none."

== Career ==
Harry Blaylock began his career in Canada riding for fellow Hamilton, Ontario native and a future Canadian Horse Racing Hall of Fame trainer, Charles Boyle. He went on to be a contract rider in the United States for a number of prominent racing stable owners including another fellow Canadian Edward Corrigan, future U.S. Racing Hall of Fame inductee William P. Burch, Lucky Baldwin, plus the Lorillard brothers Pierre and George.

On May 24, 1893, at Woodbine Racetrack in Toronto Harry Blaylock won Canada's most important race, the Queen's Plate. He was aboard Martello for trainer John Walker and owner Joseph E. Seagram, the wealthy proprietor of the Seagram distillery.

Harry Blaylock had three mounts in the Kentucky Derby with his best result in the 1887 edition when he finished fourth aboard Banburg owned by James D. Morrisey. He also competed in the 1885 Belmont Stakes in which he was second on George Lorillard's colt St. Augustine.

Some of Blaylock's important race wins in the United States were the 1877 Manhattan Handicap, the 1884 Saratoga Cup and in 1887 the inaugural running of the Latonia Oaks as well as that year's prestigious Travers Stakes. When his riding career was over, Blaylock turned to owning Thoroughbreds which he trained for racing.

The Breeder and Sportsman reported that Harry Blaylock suffered a stroke of paralysis on August 2, 1897. Although he was not expected to recover, Blaylock lived until March 20, 1899, when he died at age 40.
