= Samuel Wallin =

American politician

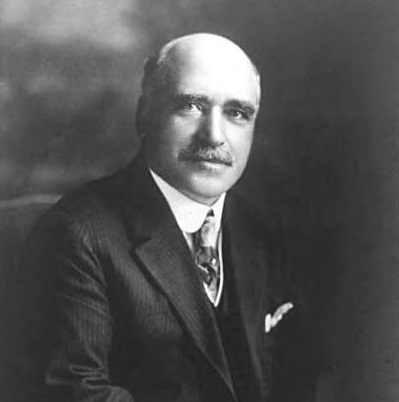
- Samuel Wallin, Mayor of Amsterdam, Congressman from New York
- Born: July 31, 1856; Easton, Pennsylvania
- Died: December 1, 1917 (aged 61); Amsterdam, New York
- Occupation: American politician

Samuel Wallin (July 31, 1856 – December 1, 1917) was a U.S. representative from New York.

Born in Easton, Pennsylvania, Wallin moved with his parents to Amsterdam, New York, in 1864. He attended the public schools and Amsterdam Academy. He engaged in the manufacture of carpets and rugs.

He served as alderman (1889–1892). He was the Mayor of Amsterdam, N.Y. (1900–1901) and a delegate to the 1916 Republican National Convention.

Wallin was elected as a Republican to the Sixty-third Congress (March 4, 1913 – March 3, 1915). He was not a candidate for renomination in 1914.

He resumed his business activities in Amsterdam, where he died December 1, 1917. He was interred in Green Hill Cemetery.

== Sources ==
- United States Congress. "Samuel Wallin (id: W000090)". Biographical Directory of the United States Congress.

U.S. House of Representatives
Preceded by John W. Dwight	Member of the U.S. House of Representatives from New York's 30th congressional district 1913–1915	Succeeded by William B. Charles
