= W. Barlow Dunlap =

American lawyer and politician (1856–1933)

William Barlow Dunlap (November 9, 1856 – November 23, 1933) was an American lawyer, politician, and judge from Amsterdam, New York.

== Life ==
Dunlap was born on November 9, 1856, in Charleston, New York, the son of William H. Dunlap, a summer hotel keeper in Asbury Park, and Elizabeth Barlow.

Dunlap spent the first twelve years of his life in Charleston, after which he spent six years in Esperance and then lived in Amsterdam for the rest of his life. He attended public school and the academy in Amsterdam. He spent time working as principal of the school in Port Jackson, later the Fifth Ward in Amsterdam. He studied law William W. Dawley and L. A. Serviss of Amsterdam, and in 1880 he was admitted to the bar. He then worked as a lawyer in Amsterdam, specializing in the surrogate's court, real estate law, and banking. He was one of the founders of the Amsterdam Savings Bank in 1886 and served as attorney and trustee of the bank.

Dunlap worked as land agent and attorney for the West Shore Railroad from 1881 to 1882. In 1888, he was elected to the New York State Assembly as a Republican, representing Montgomery County. He served in the Assembly in 1889 to 1891. Following his 1890 election to the Assembly, his Democratic opponent John F. Dwyer contested the election on the grounds a number of Republican votes were fraudulently cast. In February 1891, the Assembly voted to unseat him in a party-line vote. In 1895, he became surrogate of Montgomery County. He held that position for twelve years. He was a delegate to the 1915 New York State Constitutional Convention and a presidential elector of the 1920 presidential election.

Dunlap was vice-president of the Hamilton County Adirondacks Club of Lake Pleasant and a member of the National Republican Club. In 1878, he married Annie Howe of Amsterdam. They had one son, Clarence H. Annie died in 1911, and in 1913 he married Ellen V. Sheehy of Amsterdam. Ellen died in 1928, and in 1929 he married Clara Stone Maxwell.

Dunlap died at home from a compilation of diseases following a month's illness on November 23, 1933. His funeral was held at the Johnson & Lindsay funeral home, with Rev. Frank T. Rhoad and Rev. J. E. McIntyre of Kinderhook officiating. Members of the Amsterdam Bar Association and the directors of the Amsterdam Savings Bank were among those who attended the funeral. He was buried in the family plot in Fair View Cemetery.

New York State Assembly
Preceded by Robert Wemple	New York State Assembly; Montgomery County; 1889	Succeeded by John Knox Stewart
Preceded by John Knox Stewart	New York State Assembly; Montgomery County; 1891	Succeeded by John F. Dwyer
