= Charles McVean =

American politician (1802–1848)

Member of the U.S. House of Representatives from New York's 15th district
- In office March 4, 1833 – March 3, 1835
- Preceded by: Michael Hoffman
- Succeeded by: Matthias J. Bovee

Personal details
- Born: 1802 near Johnstown, New York, U.S.
- Died: December 22, 1848 (aged 45–46) New York City, U.S.
- Resting place: St. Andrew's Cemetery
- Party: Jacksonian
- Profession: Politician, lawyer

Charles McVean (1802 – December 22, 1848) was an American lawyer and newspaperman who served one term as a U.S. representative from New York from 1833 to 1835,

== Biography ==
Born near Johnstown, New York, McVean pursued an academic course. He studied law, was admitted to the bar and commenced practice in Johnstown. He was editor of a newspaper in Canajoharie from 1827 to 1831.

=== Congress ===
McVean was elected as a Jacksonian to the Twenty-third Congress (March 4, 1833 – March 3, 1835). He was not a candidate for renomination in 1834.

=== Later career ===
He served as district attorney of Montgomery County in 1836–1839.

He moved to New York City in 1839, where he resumed the practice of his profession. He was appointed surrogate of New York County January 24, 1844, and served until 1848. He was appointed United States Attorney for the Southern District of New York September 1, 1848.

=== Death ===
McVean died in New York City, December 22, 1848, and was interred in St. Andrew's Cemetery.

== Sources ==
- United States Congress. "Charles McVean (id: M000607)". Biographical Directory of the United States Congress.

U.S. House of Representatives
| Preceded by Michael Hoffman | Member of the U.S. House of Representatives from New York's 15th congressional district 1833–1835 | Succeeded by Matthias J. Bovee |
