= Matthias J. Bovee =

American politician

Matthias Jacob Bovee

Member of the U.S. House of Representatives from New York's 15th district
- In office March 4, 1835 – March 3, 1837
- Preceded by: Charles McVean
- Succeeded by: John Edwards

Member of the New York State Assembly
- In office 1826

Personal details
- Born: July 24, 1793 Amsterdam, New York, US
- Died: September 12, 1872 (aged 79) Eagle, Wisconsin, US
- Party: Jacksonian
- Spouse: Elizabeth Bovee
- Profession: teacher; farmer; merchant; politician; Justice of the Peace

Matthias Jacob Bovee (July 24, 1793 – September 12, 1872) was an American farmer and politician who served one term as a U.S. representative from New York from 1835 to 1837.

== Biography ==
Born in Amsterdam, New York, Bovee attended the rural school until the death of his father in 1807, then taught school in winter and worked the family farm in summer. He married Elizabeth Bovee, daughter of Isacc Bovee.

== Career ==
Bovee was a school teacher who engaged in mercantile pursuits such as railroads and banks. In 1815 and served as chairman of the town of Amsterdam. He also served as member of the county board of supervisors. In the 1820s he was a member of the New York militia. He was elected a member of the State assembly in 1826 and served as Trustee of the village of Amsterdam in 1831.

=== Congress ===
Elected as a Jacksonian to the Twenty-fourth Congress, Bovee was United States Representative for the fifteenth district of New York from March 4, 1835, to March 3, 1837. Afterward, he returned to Amsterdam and resumed mercantile pursuits.

=== Later career ===
In June 1843, Bovee moved to Milwaukee, Wisconsin, and two months later settled near Eagle, Waukesha County. He engaged in agricultural pursuits and was also Justice of the Peace for 10 years.

== Death ==
Bovee died in Eagle, Wisconsin, on September 12, 1872 (age 79 years, 50 days). He is interred at Oak Ridge Cemetery, Eagle, Wisconsin. His sister Polly (Mary) was the wife of Congressman Benedict Arnold.

U.S. House of Representatives
| Preceded by Charles McVean | Member of the U.S. House of Representatives from New York's 15th congressional district 1835–1837 | Succeeded by John Edwards |
