= Ben Ali Haggin =

American painter (1882–1951)

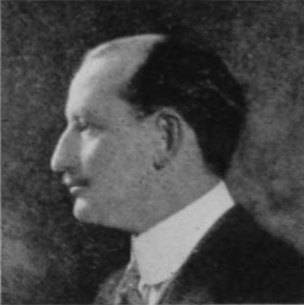
- Born: 20 April 1882; New York City, United States
- Died: 2 September 1951 (aged 69); New York City, United States
- Known for: Painter, stage designer

James Ben Ali Haggin III (20 April 1882 – 2 September 1951) was an American portrait painter and stage designer.

== Life ==
A grandson of the multi-millionaire James Ben Ali Haggin, he was born in New York City. After extensive education, he began exhibiting his paintings formally in 1903. The National Academy of Design awarded him the 1909 Third Hallgarten Prize for his painting Elfrida. A founding member of the National Association of Portrait Painters, he was elected an Associate member of the National Academy of Design from 1912. In the 1930s, Haggin turned his abilities to stage design and created sets for the Metropolitan Opera Ballet and the Ziegfeld Follies.

Haggin's family were of partial Turkish origin (one of his paternal great-grandfathers, Ibrahim Ben Ali, was a Turkish immigrant). He married Margaret Faith Robinson on 4 November 1903 at the Church of the Transfiguration, New York.

In 1914, several major events occurred in Haggin's life. He separated from his wife and spent time in a sanitarium. His grandfather also died that year, and Haggin inherited a reputed $10 million from the estate.

In 1916, Haggin married Helen Roche from Roxbury, Boston, an actress and dancer known professionally as Bonnie Glass. She secured a Mexican divorce from Haggin in 1928.

== Gallery ==
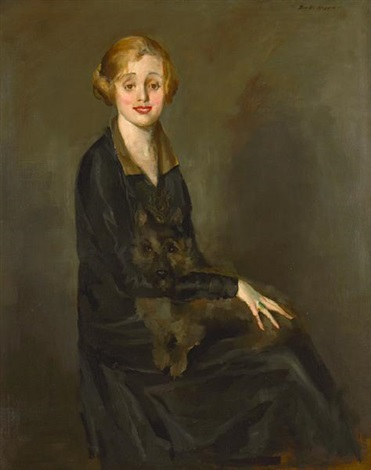
Portrait of Laurette Taylor

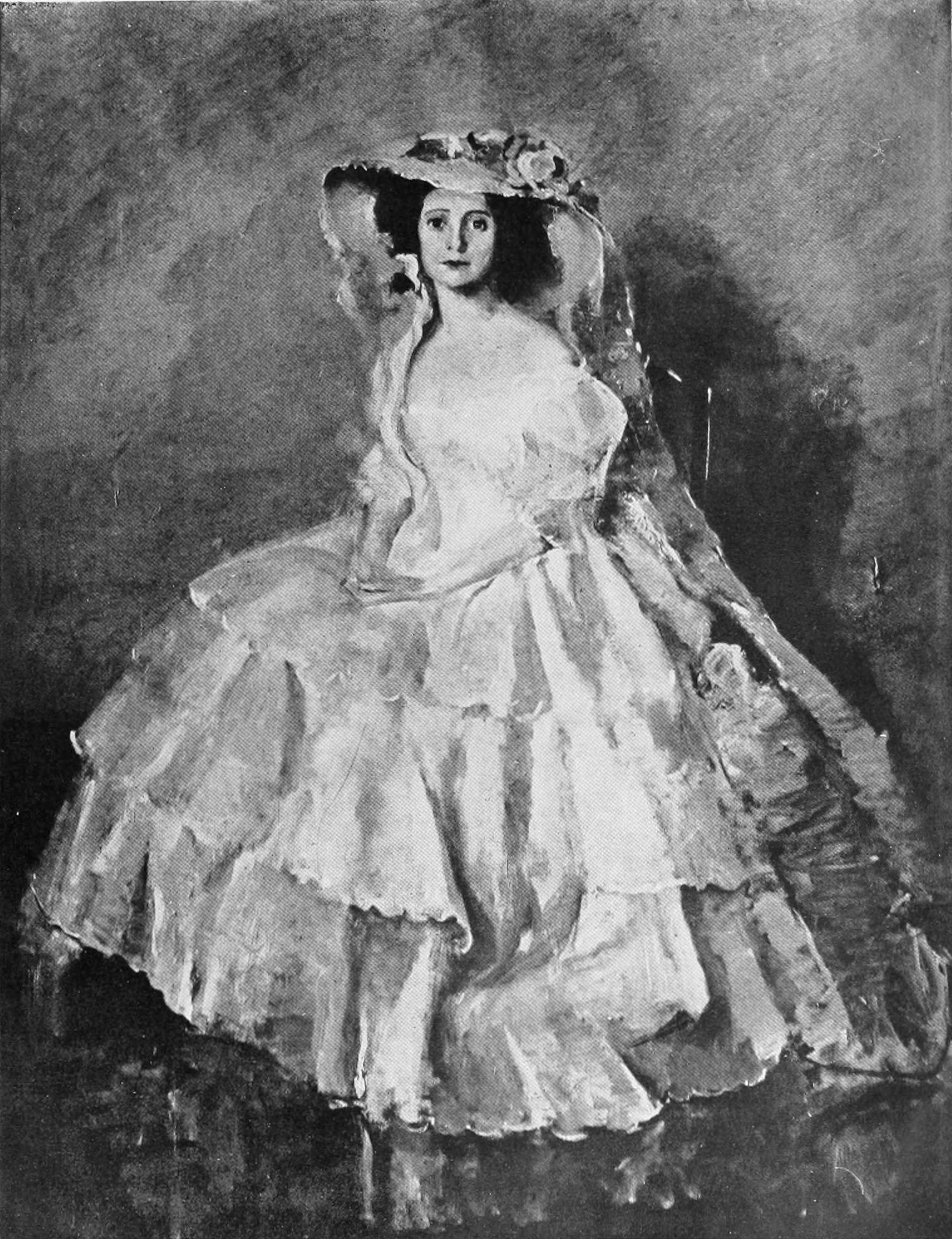
En Crinoline, a portrait of Rita Sacchetto

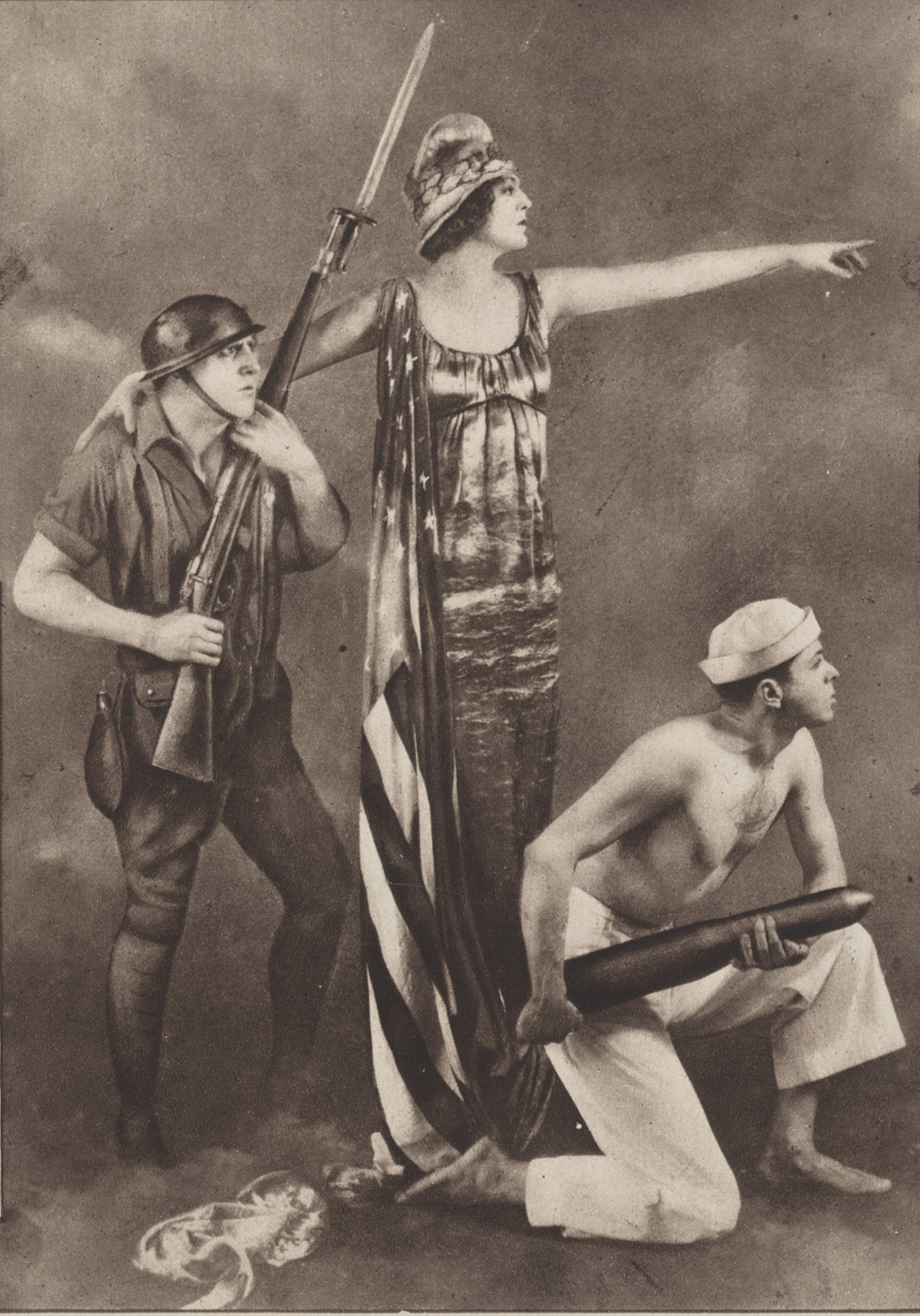
America Answers, a photographic tableau featuring Ethel Barrymore

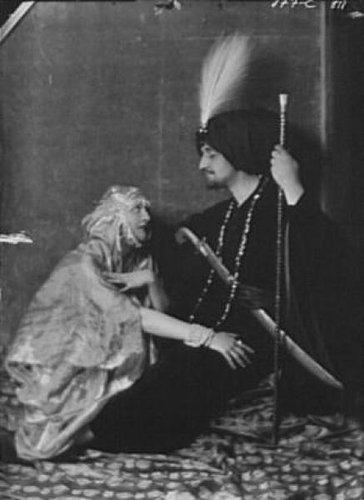
Ben Ali Haggin and Helen Roche (1915)

== See also ==
- National Red Cross Pageant (1917)
- Haggin Museum
