= William B. Charles =

American politician

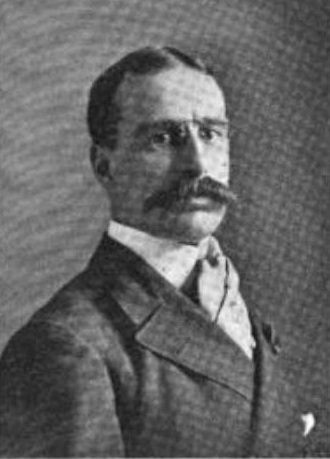

Member of the House of Representatives from New York's 30th District
- In office March 4, 1915 – March 3, 1917
- Preceded by: Samuel Wallin
- Succeeded by: George R. Lunn

New York State Assembly Montgomery County
- In office 1904–1906

Personal details
- Born: William B. Charles; April 3, 1861 Glasgow, Scotland
- Died: November 25, 1950 (aged 89) Amsterdam, New York, US
- Party: Republican

William Barclay Charles (April 3, 1861 – November 25, 1950) was an American politician from New York.

== Life ==
Born in Glasgow, Scotland, Charles attended private schools and high schools in Stirling and Glasgow, Scotland. He immigrated to the United States in 1884 and spent two years ranching in Texas and Mexico.

He settled in Amsterdam, New York, in 1886 and engaged in textile manufacturing. He was a member of the New York State Assembly (Montgomery Co.) in 1904, 1905 and 1906. He served as director of the Amsterdam First National Bank.

Charles was elected as a Republican to the 64th United States Congress, holding office from March 4, 1915, to March 3, 1917. Charles continued in the textile business until his retirement.

Charles was a presidential elector in the 1924 presidential election.

He died in Amsterdam, New York, November 25, 1950, and was interred in Green Hill Cemetery.

New York State Assembly
Preceded by John W. Candee	New York State Assembly; Montgomery County; 1904–1906	Succeeded by T. Romeyn Staley
U.S. House of Representatives
Preceded by Samuel Wallin	Member of the U.S. House of Representatives from New York's 30th congressional district 1915–1917	Succeeded by George R. Lunn
