= John Sanford (1803–1857) =

American politician

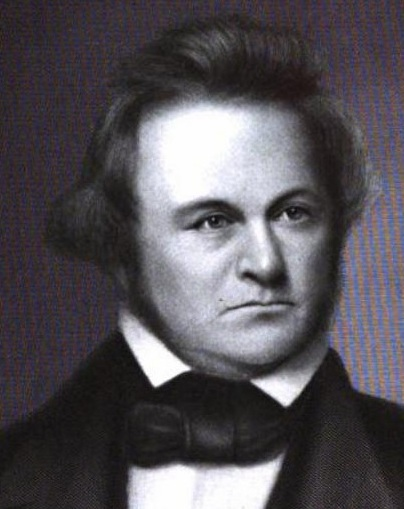
- Rep. John Sanford, (D., N.Y.)

Member of the U.S. House of Representatives from New York's 15th district
- In office March 4, 1841 – March 3, 1843
- Preceded by: Peter Joseph Wagner
- Succeeded by: Lemuel Stetson

Personal details
- Born: June 3, 1803 Roxbury, Connecticut, U.S.
- Died: October 4, 1857 (aged 54) Amsterdam, New York, U.S.
- Resting place: Green Hill Cemetery, Amsterdam, New York, U.S.
- Party: Democratic
- Relatives: Nehemiah Curtis Sanford (brother)

John Sanford (June 3, 1803 – October 4, 1857) was an American businessman and politician who served one term as a U.S. representative from New York from 1841 to 1843.

== Biography ==
=== Early life ===
John Sanford was born in Roxbury, Connecticut.

=== Family ===
He was the second son of Sarah Curtis (1771–1856) and her husband Stephen Sandford I (1769–1848). His brother was Nehemiah Curtis Sanford, who was the father of Henry Shelton Sanford, the diplomat who founded the city of Sanford, Florida.

=== Career ===
He moved to Amsterdam, New York, in 1821 where he taught school. He later taught in Mayfield and also engaged in mercantile pursuits there.

=== Congress ===
He was elected as a Democrat to the Twenty-seventh Congress (March 4, 1841 – March 3, 1843).

=== Later career ===
He returned to Amsterdam and founded a carpet mill but the factory was destroyed by fire in 1854, whereupon he retired from active business.

=== Personal life ===
In 1822, he married Amsterdam native Mary Slack (1803–1888). They had three daughters and three sons:

- Sarah Caroline (1824–1871)
- Stephen (1826–1913)
- Nelson (1828–1848)
- David (1830–1885)
- Aledah (born 1833)
- Harriette (born 1836)

=== Death ===
He died in Amsterdam in 1857 and was interred there in the Green Hill Cemetery.

=== Family ===
His son Stephen served in Congress and operated the family carpet business, as did his grandson John Sanford II. Originally Sanford Carpet, the company merged with another manufacturer to become Bigelow-Sanford. Bigelow-Sanford later became part of Mohawk Industries, a maker of carpet and other flooring.

== Sources ==
- United States Congress. "John Sanford (id: S000048)". Biographical Directory of the United States Congress.

U.S. House of Representatives
Preceded by Peter Joseph Wagner	Member of the U.S. House of Representatives from New York's 15th congressional district 1841–1843	Succeeded by Lemuel Stetson
