= Bigelow-Hartford Carpet Mills =

- U.S. National Register of Historic Places
- U.S. Historic district – Contributing property
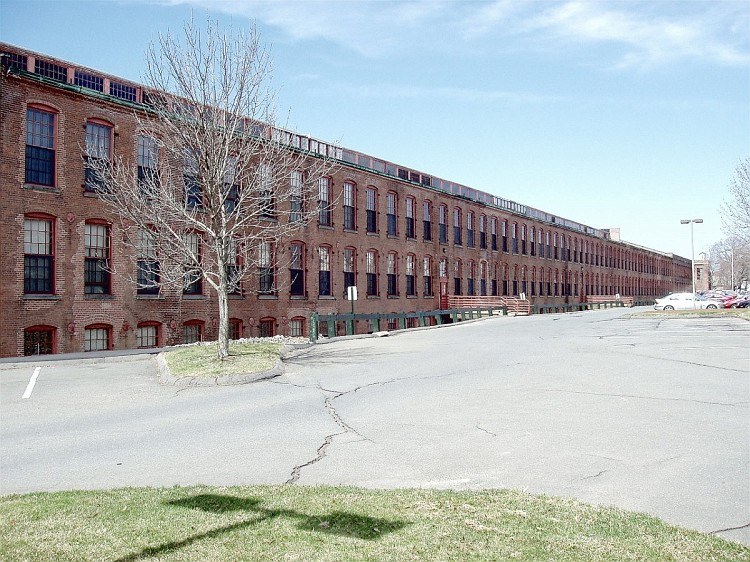

- Location within Connecticut Location within the United States
- Location: Main and Pleasant Streets, Thompsonville, Connecticut
- Coordinates: 42.00085°N 72.60311°W
- Area: 22.8 acres (9.2 ha)
- Built: 1895
- Part of: Bigelow-Hartford Carpet Mills Historic District (ID94001382)
- NRHP reference No.: 83001256

Significant dates
- Added to NRHP: March 10, 1983
- Designated CP: November 25, 1994

The Bigelow-Hartford Carpet Mills were once one of the largest manufacturers of carpeting in the United States. The company's early 20th-century factories, located in Thompsonville, Connecticut, were listed on the National Register of Historic Places in 1983. Used by a succession of carpet makers until the 1960s, the company complex has for the most part been converted to residential use.

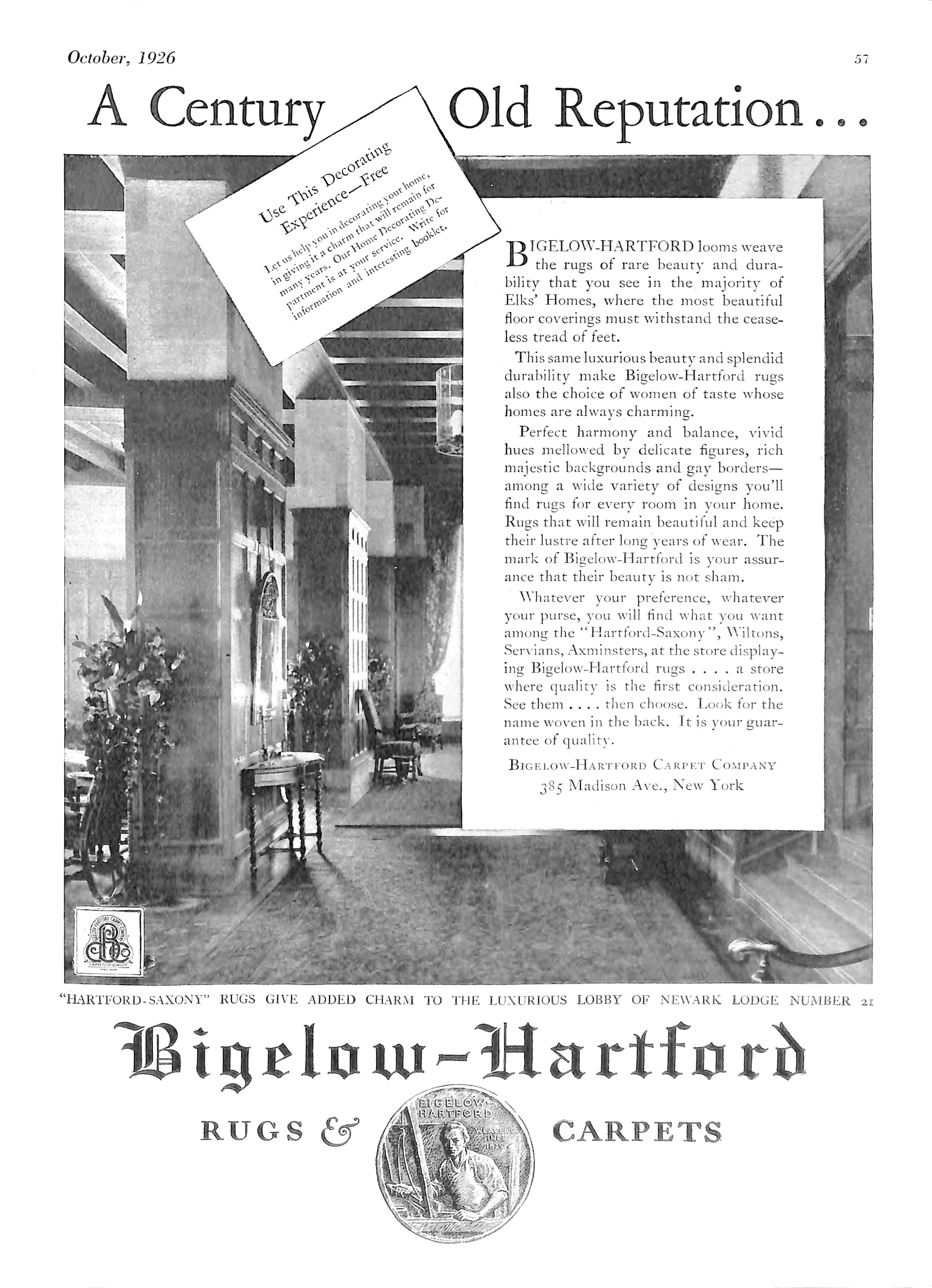
A Bigelow-Hartford advertisement from 1926

== Description and history ==
The Bigelow-Hartford Carpet Mills complex stands in the Thompsonville area of western Enfield, Connecticut, separated from the Connecticut River by a railroad right-of-way. On nearly 23 acres (9.3 ha) of land stand seven large brick buildings, dating from about 1895 to 1928, the height of the company's operations in Thompsonville. Buildings range in height between one and four floors, and are built in a vernacular industrial Italianate style. The largest building, the 1901 Tapestry Mill, is nearly 900 feet (270 m) long.

The Bigelow-Hartford Carpet Company had its origins in a carpet manufacturing business established in Thompsonville by Orrin Thompson in 1828. Through the 19th century and into the early 20th century, it grew to become the nation's single biggest maker of carpet products. Built in part by mergers with other makers, it produced virtually every style of carpeting imaginable, and was thus able to achieve a dominant position in the industry. Demand for the company's products began to decline in the Great Depression, and the company reduced operations through the 1950s, finally closing production here entirely in the mid-1960s. During its period of growth, the company built a significant amount of worker housing in the areas north and east of the plant; these are the major portion of the Bigelow-Hartford Carpet Mills Historic District.

== See also ==
- National Register of Historic Places listings in Hartford County, Connecticut

== Archives and records ==
- Bigelow & Sanford Carpet Company records at Baker Library Special Collections, Harvard Business School.
