= Ibrahim Ben Ali =

Ottoman-Turk soldier who became an American physician

Ibraham Adam Ben Ali
- Ali oğlu İbrahim
- Born: Ibrahim ben Ali c. 1756; Istanbul, Ottoman Turkey
- Died: c. 1800 (aged 44-45); Baltimore, Maryland, USA
- Occupations: Janissary, Physician

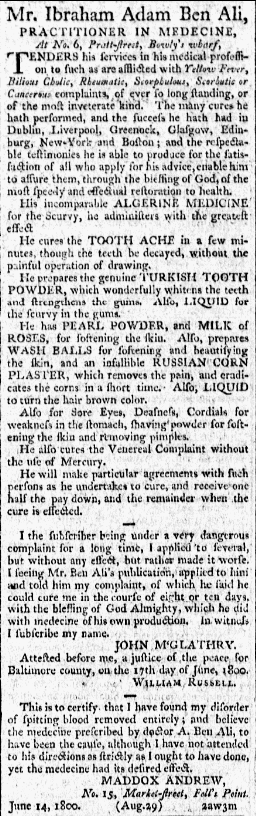
Advertisement by Ibrahim Adam Ben Ali, Federal Gazette and Daily Advertiser, Baltimore, Sep. 18, 1800

Ibraham Adam Ben Ali (né Ibrahim ben Ali; c. 1756 – c. 1800) was an Ottoman-born soldier and physician who is regarded as one of the earliest documented Turkish settlers in the United States. A convert to Christianity and associate of the Dublin Methodist theologian Adam Clarke, he spent several years in Ireland and England before emigrating to the United States, where he practiced medicine in several cities.

== Early life ==
Ben Ali was born Ibrahim ben Ali (Turkish: Ali oğlu İbrahim) in Istanbul, Ottoman Turkey, circa 1756. He was the son of Ali ben Mustapha, a Muslim landholder with an estate about six miles from the city, and Halima, a Christian slave from Zante. Halima had reportedly been captured by Venetian forces and later purchased by Mustapha, a Turkish Muslim living in Aleppo.

Although raised as a Muslim, Ben Ali received some early exposure to Christianity through his mother, as well as from several Spanish Christian slaves who were owned by the household.

At the age of thirteen he married a girl named Halima, who was twelve. In the same year he undertook the Hajj pilgrimage to Mecca. Ben Ali later took two additional wives, Fatima and Ayesha, and eventually fathered six children by the three women.

=== Military service ===
As his family grew, Ben Ali’s father secured him a commission as a captain in the Janissaries. Approximately five years into his service he was arrested and condemned to death for the alleged murder of two officers with whom he had been acquainted. On the eve of his execution, an elderly Spanish slave urged him to convert to Christianity before his death, reinforcing the Christian teachings he had earlier received from his mother. When he was unexpectedly exonerated the following morning, Ben Ali interpreted his reprieve as providential and resolved to pursue Christianity. He subsequently purchased and freed the slave and kept him in his household as a religious instructor.

=== Captivity and exile ===
During his military career Ben Ali also served as a physician in the army. In the fourth battle he fought against the Russians during the Russo-Turkish War, he was captured in Wallachia and imprisoned at Arzenicour in Russia.

While he was in captivity, other prisoners reportedly wrote to Constantinople accusing him of apostasy and treason. As a result, his parents, wives, and children fled the city for Izmail. When Russian forces later captured the outpost, the entire family was killed.

After two years in captivity Ben Ali was eventually released. Accounts differ as to how this occurred: some sources claim he restored the sight of a local woman or Russian princess who secured his freedom, while others attribute his release to the intervention of a British general. Having been warned by his brother that returning home would place him in danger, Ben Ali instead left the region by ship, traveling to Copenhagen and Liverpool before eventually reaching Dublin.

== Later life ==
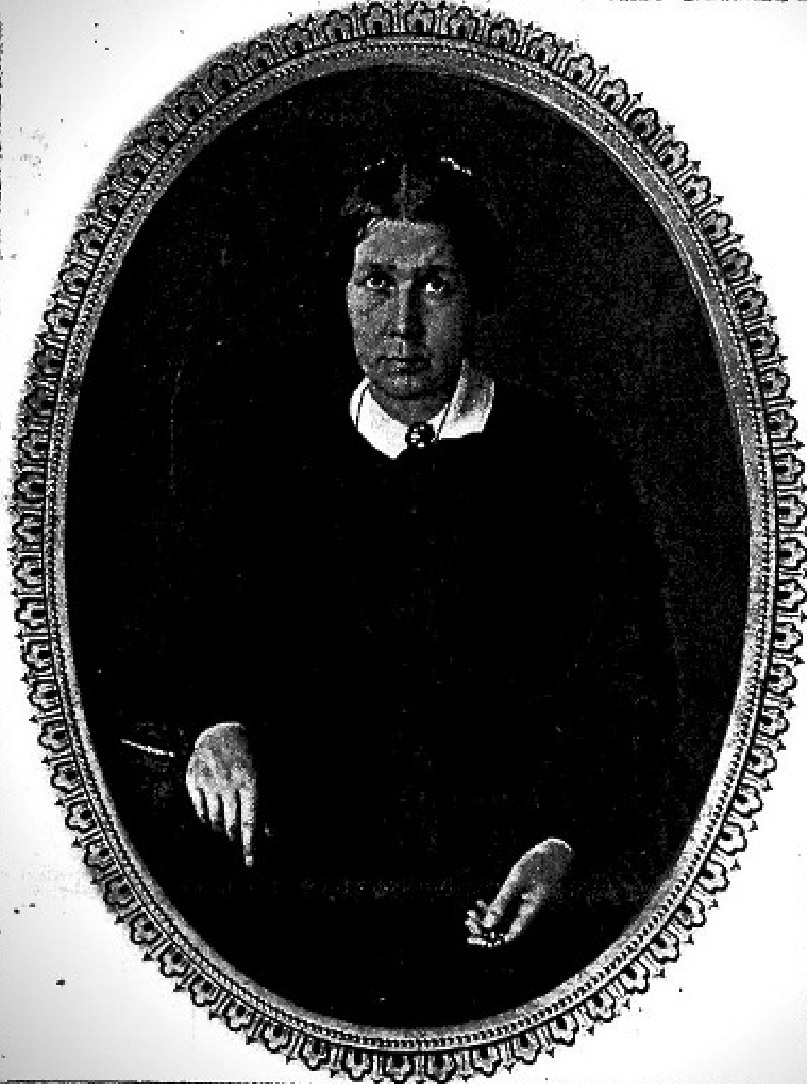
Adeline Ben Ali Haggin was the daughter of the Turkish-born physician.

=== Life in Britain ===
Arriving in Dublin in 1791 with little knowledge of English but fluent in Arabic and Spanish, Ben Ali was introduced to the Rev. Adam Clarke. Under Clarke’s guidance he received daily religious instruction and was eventually baptized under the name Adam, with the ceremony translated for him into Spanish by Clarke.

Ben Ali subsequently accompanied Clarke on ministerial journeys to Liverpool. After about two years there, he traveled with him to Manchester, where he remained for “some considerable time.” During this period he also spent time in Greenock, Glasgow, and Edinburgh, before eventually emigrating to the United States.

=== Life in the United States ===
In America, styling himself Dr. Ibraham Adam Ben Ali, he established a medical practice in Boston. There he advertised various patent medicines in late 1794. He later practiced in several American cities, including New York City beginning in 1795, Philadelphia in 1799, and Baltimore in 1800.

During his time in America he married an Englishwoman who was a Baptist. The couple had one daughter, Adeline, who later married Terah Temple Haggin and became the mother of the prominent lawyer and investor James Ben Ali Haggin (1822–1914).

== Death ==
In 1800 Ben Ali died at or near Baltimore during the yellow fever epidemic that struck both that city and Philadelphia. According to later accounts, he contracted the disease while treating those who had been infected.

== Legacy ==
Ben Ali is remembered as one of the earliest known Turkish settlers in the United States. Through his daughter Adeline, he became the grandfather of the lawyer, investor, and Thoroughbred breeder James Ben Ali Haggin (1822–1914), one of the wealthiest businessmen in nineteenth-century America and a prominent figure in the development of American horse racing. The Ben Ali name entered American sporting history through Haggin’s racing operations, a horse owned by Haggin named Ben Ali won the 1886 Kentucky Derby.

The Grade III Ben Ali Stakes at Keeneland Race Course in Lexington, Kentucky, is named in commemoration of the family name.

== See also ==
- James Ben Ali Haggin, Ben Ali's grandson
- William Haggin Perry, one of Ben Ali's descendants, an American owner and breeder of Thoroughbred racehorses
- Ben Ali (horse), a race horse named after the family that won the 1886 Kentucky Derby
- Ben Ali Stakes, an American race for Thoroughbred horses run annually since 1937 in Lexington, Kentucky.
- Marie Tepe, 19th-century settler to the US of Turkish origin
- Turks of South Carolina, an early mixed-ancestry Turkish American population in South Carolina
