= 1886 Kentucky Derby =

Horse race

12th Kentucky Derby
- Kentucky Derby
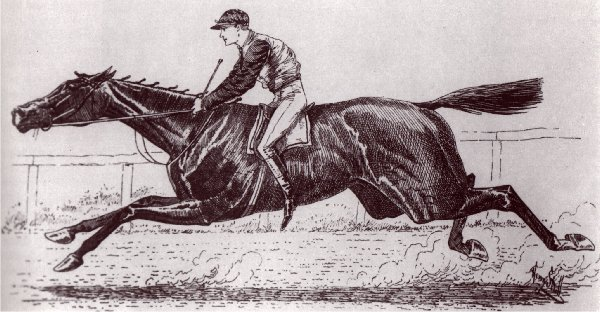
- 1886 Kentucky Derby winner Ben Ali
- Location: Churchill Downs
- Date: May 14, 1886
- Winning horse: Ben Ali
- Jockey: Patsy Duffy
- Trainer: James Murphy
- Owner: James Ben Ali Haggin
- Surface: Dirt

The 1886 Kentucky Derby was the 12th running of the Kentucky Derby. The race took place on May 14, 1886. The winning time of 2:36.50 set a new Derby record.

== Full results ==
Finished	Post	Horse	Jockey	Trainer	Owner	Time / behind
1st	10	Ben Ali	Patsy Duffy	James Murphy	James B. A. Haggin	2:36.50
2nd	2	Blue Wing	Edward Garrison	Edward D. Brown	Melbourne Stable	
3rd	8	Free Knight	William J. Fitzpatrick		Patrick Corrigan	
4th	9	Lijero	Isaac Murphy		Lucky Baldwin	
5th	5	Jim Gray	T. Withers		Gray & Co.	
6th	1	Grimaldi	Isaac E. Lewis		J. & J. Swigert	
7th	3	Sir Joseph	W. Conkling		Robert A. Swigert	
8th	6	Harrodsburg	J. Riley		Jack P. Chinn & George Morgan	
9th	7	Lafitte	John Stoval		J.G. Greener & Co.	
10th	4	Masterpiece	Ed West	John W. Rogers	Samuel S. Brown	

- Winning Breeder: Daniel Swigert; (KY)

== Payout ==
Post	Horse	Win	Place	Show
	Ben Ali	$ 13.60	12.00	
	Blue Wing		$16.00	

- The winner received a purse of $4,890.
- Second place received $300.
- Third place received $150.
