= Nehemiah Curtis Sanford =

American politician

Nehemiah Curtis Sanford (1792–1841) was an American industrialist and politician.

Nehemiah Sanford was the son of Sarah Curtis (1771–1856) and her husband Stephen Sandford I (1769–1848). He was a brother to John Sanford, the founder of the Amsterdam, New York branch of the Sanford family.

Nehemiah Sanford became one of the chief founders of Birmingham, Connecticut and in 1833 was elected to the Connecticut Senate for the 16th District. He married Nancy Bateman Shelton (1800–1880), a direct descendant of Thomas Welles, a Governor of the Connecticut Colony. Their only son, Henry Shelton Sanford became an important American diplomat who founded the city of Sanford, Florida.
