= John Sanford (1851–1939) =

American politician

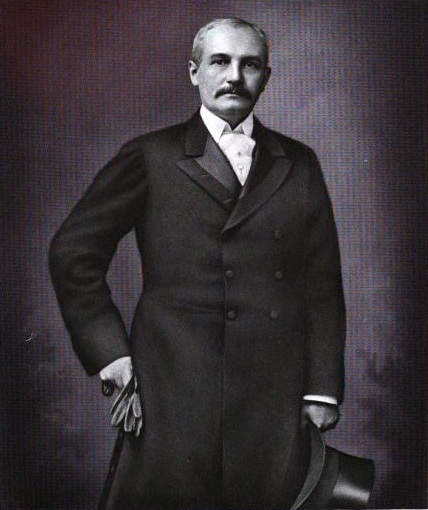

Member of the U.S. House of Representatives from New York's 20th district
- In office March 4, 1889 – March 3, 1893
- Preceded by: George West
- Succeeded by: Charles Tracey

Personal details
- Born: January 18, 1851 Amsterdam, New York, U.S.
- Died: September 26, 1939 (aged 88) Saratoga, New York, U.S.
- Resting place: Green Hill Cemetery, Amsterdam, New York, U.S.
- Party: Republican
- Parent: Stephen Sanford (father)
- Relatives: John Sanford (grandfather)
- Education: Yale College
- Occupation: Businessman, racehorse breeder

John Sanford (January 18, 1851 – September 26, 1939) was an American businessman, a prominent owner/breeder of thoroughbred racehorses, and a member of the United States House of Representatives from New York's 20th congressional district.

== Early life ==
John Sanford, a son of Sarah Jane Cochrane and Stephen Sanford and the grandson of John Sanford was born on January 18, 1851, in Amsterdam, New York, and died on September 26, 1939, in Saratoga, New York. He was a descendant of Gov. Thomas Welles, the Fourth Colonial Governor of Connecticut and the transcriber of the Fundamental Orders.

He attended Amsterdam Academy, and the Poughkeepsie Military Institute. He was educated at Yale College, earning a degree in 1872.

== Career ==
He engaged with his father in the carpet manufacturing industry in Amsterdam, New York.

Sanford was elected as a Republican to the Fifty-first and Fifty-second Congresses (March 4, 1889 – March 3, 1893). He was not a candidate for renomination in 1892 and resumed his former business pursuits. He served as delegate to the 1892 Republican National Convention. He was a presidential elector in the 1896 presidential election.

== Thoroughbred horse racing ==
On the death of his father Stephen in 1913, John Sanford inherited Hurricana Stock Farm. His father had been successful in racing and John Sanford would become a major figure in the industry. He raced a number of top horses and in 1916 won the Kentucky Derby with his colt, George Smith. In 1923 he became the first American to win the most prestigious steeplechase race in the world when his horse Sergeant Murphy won the English Grand National. In 1923, Sanford won the American Grand National with Best Play.

John Sanford was member of the New York Racing Commission and the Sanford Stakes, run annually at Saratoga Race Course, is named in his family's honor.

In 1927, John Sanford changed the Hurricana Stock Farm name to Sanford Stud Farms. A major breeder, Sanford imported several important stallions from Europe where he owned Haras de Cheffreville in Cheffreville-Tonnencourt, France.

== Personal life ==
He married at Sanford, Florida, February 17, 1892, Ethel Sanford, born on September 2, 1873, at Brussels, Belgium and died on November 13, 1924 in New York City. She was a daughter of Hon. Henry Shelton Sanford and Gertrude Ellen Dupuy. Henry Shelton Sanford was the accomplished diplomat and successful businessman and founder of the city of Sanford, Florida.

John and Ethel were the parents of the following three children:

- Stephen "Laddie" Sanford, born in Amsterdam, New York, September 15, 1899, was an American professional polo player and director of the Bigelow-Sanford Carpet Company whose wife was American actress, Mary Duncan. He was one of the several men who had an affair with Lady Edwina Mountbatten.
- Sara Jane Sanford, born in Amsterdam, New York, November 8, 1900. She married Italian diplomat, Mario Pansa in 1937.
- Gertrude Sanford Legendre, was born in Aiken, South Carolina, March 21, 1902, and was an American socialite who served as a spy during World War II. She was also a noted explorer, big-game hunter, environmentalist, and owner of Medway plantation in South Carolina. She was inspiration for Philip Barry's 1929 play "Holiday", made into a classic movie starring Katharine Hepburn and Cary Grant.

== Death ==
He died in Saratoga, New York, in 1939 and was interred in the family plot in the Green Hill Cemetery in Amsterdam, New York. His once renowned breeding farm and training facility in Amsterdam has fallen into severe decay. In 2007, the "Friends of Sanford Stud Farm" was formed by a former Sanford jockey Louis F. Hildebrandt in an attempt to raise the funds necessary to restore the property.

== Sources ==
- United States Congress. "John Sanford (id: S000047)". Biographical Directory of the United States Congress.

U.S. House of Representatives
Preceded by George West	Member of the U.S. House of Representatives from New York's 20th congressional district 1889–1893	Succeeded by Charles Tracey
