= Ben Ali (horse) =

American-bred Thoroughbred racehorse

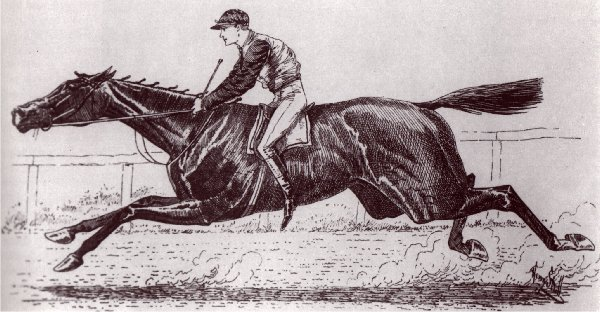
- Sire: Virgil
- Grandsire: Vandal
- Dam: Ulrica
- Damsire: Lexington
- Sex: Stallion
- Foaled: 1883
- Country: United States
- Colour: Bay
- Breeder: Daniel Swigert
- Owner: James Ben Ali Haggin
- Trainer: Jim Murphy
- Record: 40: 12-3-5
- Earnings: $25,090

Major wins
- Hopeful Stakes (1885); Charles Green Stakes (1886); St. Louis Derby (1886); Ocean Stakes (1886); Spirit of the Times Stakes (1886); Winters Stakes (1886); Free Handicap (1887); Fourth of July Handicap (1887) American Classics wins: Kentucky Derby (1886)

Ben Ali (1883 - c.1903) was the winner of the 1886 Kentucky Derby and was named after his owner, James Ben Ali Haggin, a man of Turkish heritage who had struck gold in the California Gold Rush of 1849. Ben Ali was foaled in Kentucky and was a large bay colt sired by Virgil. His damsire was the great Lexington, a major foundation sire of American thoroughbreds. Ben Ali is best known for his Derby win and a wagering snafu that ushered in a bad era for the Kentucky Derby.^{1}

== Wagering monopoly and boycott ==
In 1886, C. M. White purchased the pooling privileges (wagering rights) for the Kentucky Derby for $30,600 and demanded that all the Derby bookmakers pay him a $100 licensing fee to operate at the track. The bookmakers refused and, as a consequence, there were no bookies at the 1886 Derby to handle high-dollar bets. Haggin could not place a large bet on his winning stallion and was so upset that he threatened to bar his entire stable from ever racing in another Kentucky Derby unless bookmakers were reinstated at the track. The track director refused Haggin's demands, replying, "To hell with him anyway", enraging Haggin and causing him to shun the Derby. News traveled in the East Coast horse racing circuits of Haggin's treatment in Louisville, causing many Eastern horsemen to boycott the Kentucky Derby during the 1890s and early 20th century.^{1} Bookmakers returned for the 1887 Derby, but the field quality and race profits dropped dramatically over the years until Churchill Downs was facing closure in 1903. Churchill Downs was sold to a syndicate led by Matt Winn in 1903.

Ben Ali is reported to have died at around 20 years of age (c. 1903) at Haggin's Rancho del Paso stud in California.

== Pedigree ==
Pedigree of Ben Ali
Sire Virgil 1864	Vandal 1850	Glencoe I	Sultan
Sire Virgil 1864	Vandal 1850	Glencoe I	Trampoline
Sire Virgil 1864	Vandal 1850	Tranby Mare	Tranby
Sire Virgil 1864	Vandal 1850	Tranby Mare	Lucilla
Sire Virgil 1864	Hymenia 1851	Yorkshire	St. Nicholas
Sire Virgil 1864	Hymenia 1851	Yorkshire	Miss Rose
Sire Virgil 1864	Hymenia 1851	Little Peggy	Cripple
Sire Virgil 1864	Hymenia 1851	Little Peggy	Peggy Stewart
Dam Ulrica 1863	Lexington 1850	Boston	Timoleon
Dam Ulrica 1863	Lexington 1850	Boston	Florizel Mare
Dam Ulrica 1863	Lexington 1850	Alice Carneal	Sarpedon
Dam Ulrica 1863	Lexington 1850	Alice Carneal	Rowena
Dam Ulrica 1863	Emilia 1840	Young Emilius	Emilius
Dam Ulrica 1863	Emilia 1840	Young Emilius	Shoveler
Dam Ulrica 1863	Emilia 1840	Persian	Whisker
Dam Ulrica 1863	Emilia 1840	Persian	Variety
