= Hurricana Stock Farm =

- U.S. National Register of Historic Places
- Location within New York Location within the United States
- Location: NY 30, Amsterdam, New York
- Coordinates: 42°57′30″N 74°11′08″W
- Area: 126.41 acres (51.16 ha)
- Built: c. 1880-1960
- NRHP reference No.: 13000308
- Added to NRHP: May 22, 2013

Hurricana Stock Farm, also known as Sanford Stud Farm, is a historic home and related farm outbuildings located at Amsterdam in Montgomery County, New York. It includes the Broodmare Barn (c. 1880–1914), Jumping Horse Barn (c. 1920), feed shed(c. 1895), mare barn (c. 1885), farm barn (c. 1890–1905), blacksmith's shop (c. 1893), tool and horse barn (c. 1910), garage (c. 1915), two sheds (c. 1900), a mare barn (c. 1893), ten mare barns along South Lane (1890–1895), trainer's house (c. 1920), and outbuilding (c. 1920). The farm was used for Thoroughbred horse breeding and training.

It was added to the National Register of Historic Places in 2013.
