= James Ben Ali Haggin =

Turkish origin American attorney, rancher, investor, and racehorse owner

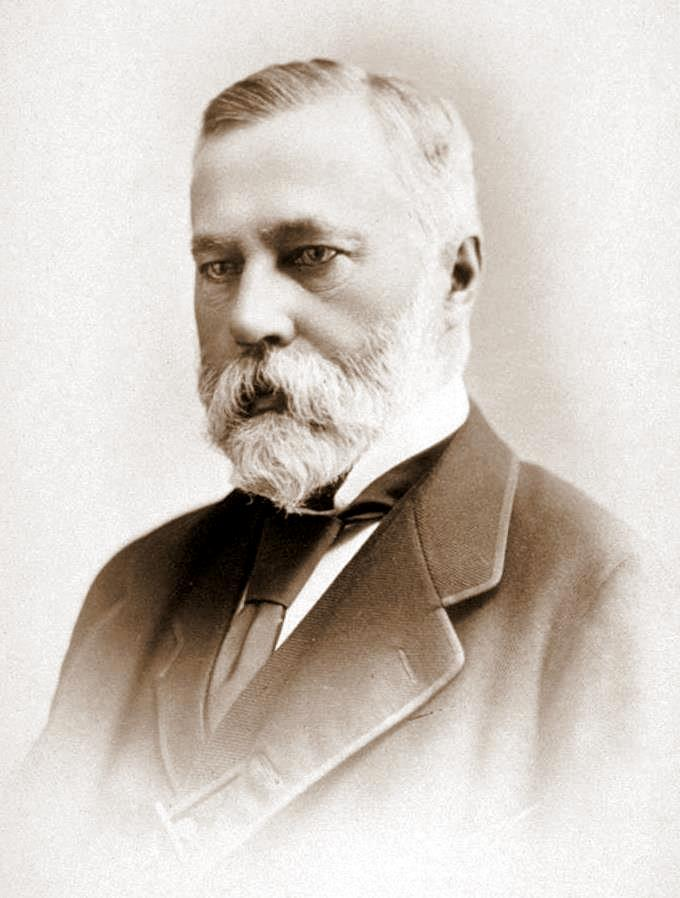
- Born: December 9, 1822; Harrodsburg, Kentucky, United States
- Died: September 12, 1914 (aged 91); Newport, Rhode Island, United States
- Resting place: Woodlawn Cemetery
- Education: Centre College
- Occupations: Lawyer, Rancher, Investor, Racehorse owner/breeder
- Known for: Rancho Del Paso, Elmendorf Farm
- Spouses: Eliza Jane Sanders (m. 1846–1893) (her death) Margaret Pearl Voorhies (m. 1897)
- Children: 5

Signature
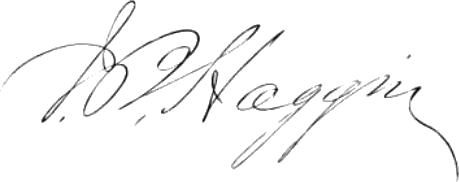

James Ben Ali Haggin (December 9, 1822 – September 12, 1914) was an American attorney, rancher, investor, art collector, and a major owner and breeder in the sport of Thoroughbred horse racing. Haggin made a fortune in the aftermath of the California Gold Rush and was a multi-millionaire by 1880.

Those who recounted James Ben Ali Haggin's appearance often noted his short stature and "slightly Oriental appearance handed down from his Turkish ancestors".

== Life ==
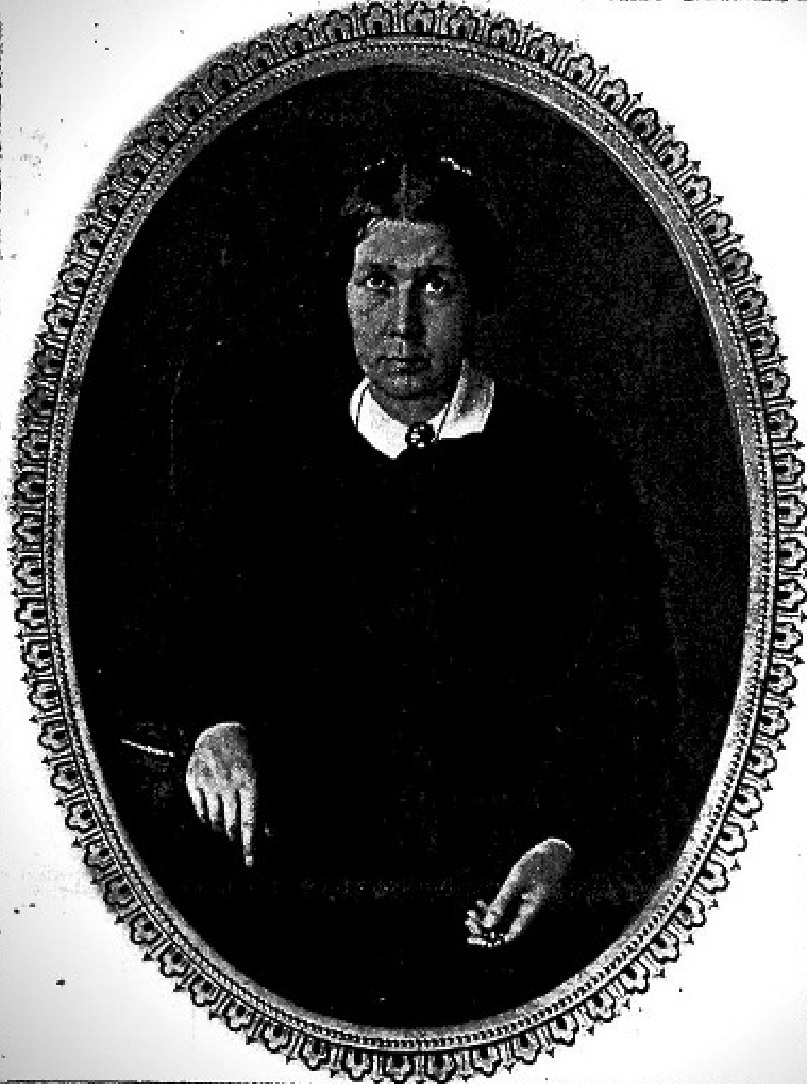
Adeline Ben Ali Haggin was the daughter of the Turkish-born physician, Ibrahim Ben Ali.

Haggin was born in Harrodsburg, Mercer County, Kentucky, a descendant of one of the state's pioneer families who had settled there in 1775 and a descendant of Ibrahim Ben Ali, who was an early American settler of Turkish origin. He graduated from Centre College at Danville, Kentucky, then entered the practice of law.

In October 1850, he joined a Kentucky acquaintance, Lloyd Tevis, in opening a law office in Sacramento. They moved to San Francisco in 1853. He built a large and impressive Nob Hill mansion on the east side of Taylor Street between Clay and Washington streets, which stood until the earthquake and fire of 1906. It was to decorate the walls of the 61 rooms of this mansion that Haggin began the core of the family art collection that would eventually be housed in the Haggin Museum (named for his son Louis Terah Haggin) in Stockton, California.

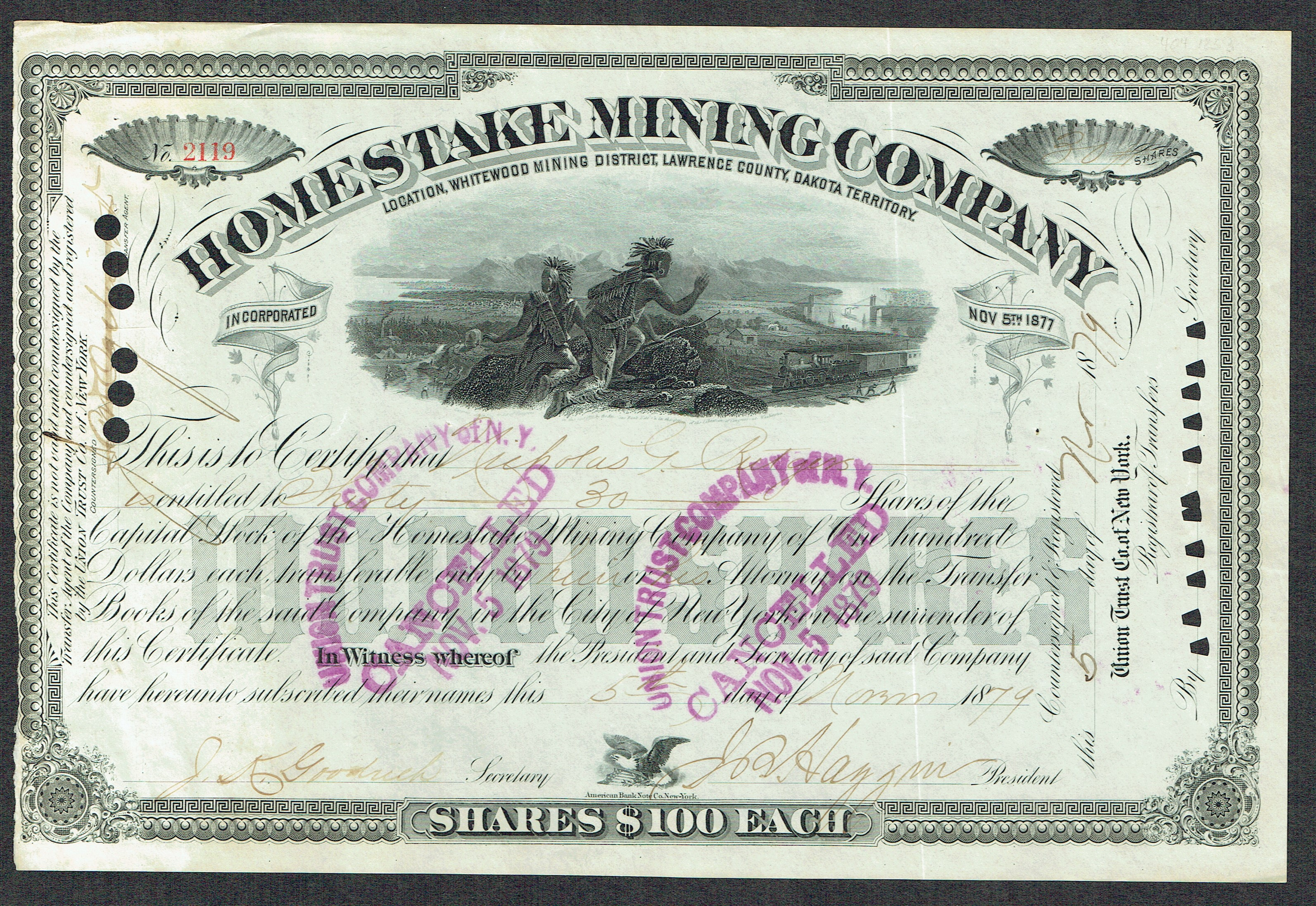
Share of the Homestake Mining Company, issued 5 November 1879; signed by President JBA Haggin

Haggin and Tevis married sisters, daughters of Colonel Lewis Sanders, a Kentuckian who had emigrated to California. Haggin and Tevis acquired the Rancho Del Paso land grant near Sacramento. The two invested in the mining business with George Hearst as one of their partners. Hearst, Haggin, Tevis and Co. became one of the largest mining companies in the United States; its operations included the Ontario silver mine in Park City, Utah, the Homestake Mine in South Dakota, and with Marcus Daly, the Anaconda Copper Company in Montana.

The James Ben Ali Haggin Papers, 1887-1914, are kept at the Bancroft Library at the University of California at Berkeley.

== Thoroughbred racing ==
Haggin purchased the Rancho Del Paso horse farm near Sacramento, California in 1859. He made it one of the country's most important horse breeding and Thoroughbred racing operations whose horses competed from coast-to-coast. In 1905, Haggin stopped using Rancho De Paso as a horse breeding farm and concentrated his breeding efforts at his Elmendorf Farm in Lexington, Kentucky. Haggin had acquired Elmendorf in 1897 and until his death in 1914 worked to develop it into the largest horse breeding operation in the United States of its era.

=== Major racing successes ===
Haggin owned the colt Tyrant which in 1885 he sent to compete as a three-year-old on the U.S. East Coast where he won the prestigious Withers and Belmont Stakes, the latter becoming the third leg of the U.S. Triple Crown series. The following year his colt Ben Ali won the 1886 Kentucky Derby.

At Rancho Del Paso Haggin bred Comanche and Africander, colts which won the 1893 and 1903 Belmont Stakes respectively.

== Legacy ==
- Ben Ali Stakes at Keeneland Race Course in Lexington.
- Mount Haggin (10,607 ft / 3,233 m), in the Anaconda Range ten miles from the town of Anaconda in southwestern Montana, also is named for James Ben Ali Haggin.

== Personal life ==
Haggin was the eldest of eight children of Terah Temple and Adeline (Ben Ali) Haggin, the daughter of Ibrahim Ben Ali, a Turkish army officer.

On December 28, 1846, Haggin married Eliza Jane Sanders of Natchez, Mississippi with whom he had five children. She died May 18, 1894. On December 30, 1897, the seventy-five-year-old Haggin married twenty-eight-year-old Margaret Voorhies at her stepfather's residence in Versailles, Kentucky. Miss Voorhies was a niece of his first wife.

Haggin died September 12, 1914, at his Newport, Rhode Island, residence and was buried in Woodlawn Cemetery in New York.

His grandson, James Ben Ali Haggin III, was a portrait painter and stage designer. Grandson Richard Lounsbery, was a businessman and amateur painter who established the Richard Lounsbery Foundation. Descendants active in Thoroughbred racing and breeding include Louis Lee Haggin II of Kentucky and William Haggin Perry of Virginia.

== See also ==
- Haggin Museum
