= American Turkish Friendship Association =

American Turkish Friendship Association (ATFA) is a non-profit non-governmental organization founded in 2003 by members of the Gülen movement, made up of followers of the Islamic cleric Fethullah Gülen. Its stated goal is addressing the social and cultural needs of Turkish and American people living in the Washington D.C. Metropolitan Area.

ATFA's headquarters is at 14120 Newbrook Dr. Chantilly, Virginia, Virginia 20151.

== See also ==
- American-Turkish Council
- Assembly of Turkish American Associations
- Federation of Turkish American Associations
- Lobbying in the United States
- Turkish Americans
