= JJ Brine =

American guitarist (1982–2021)

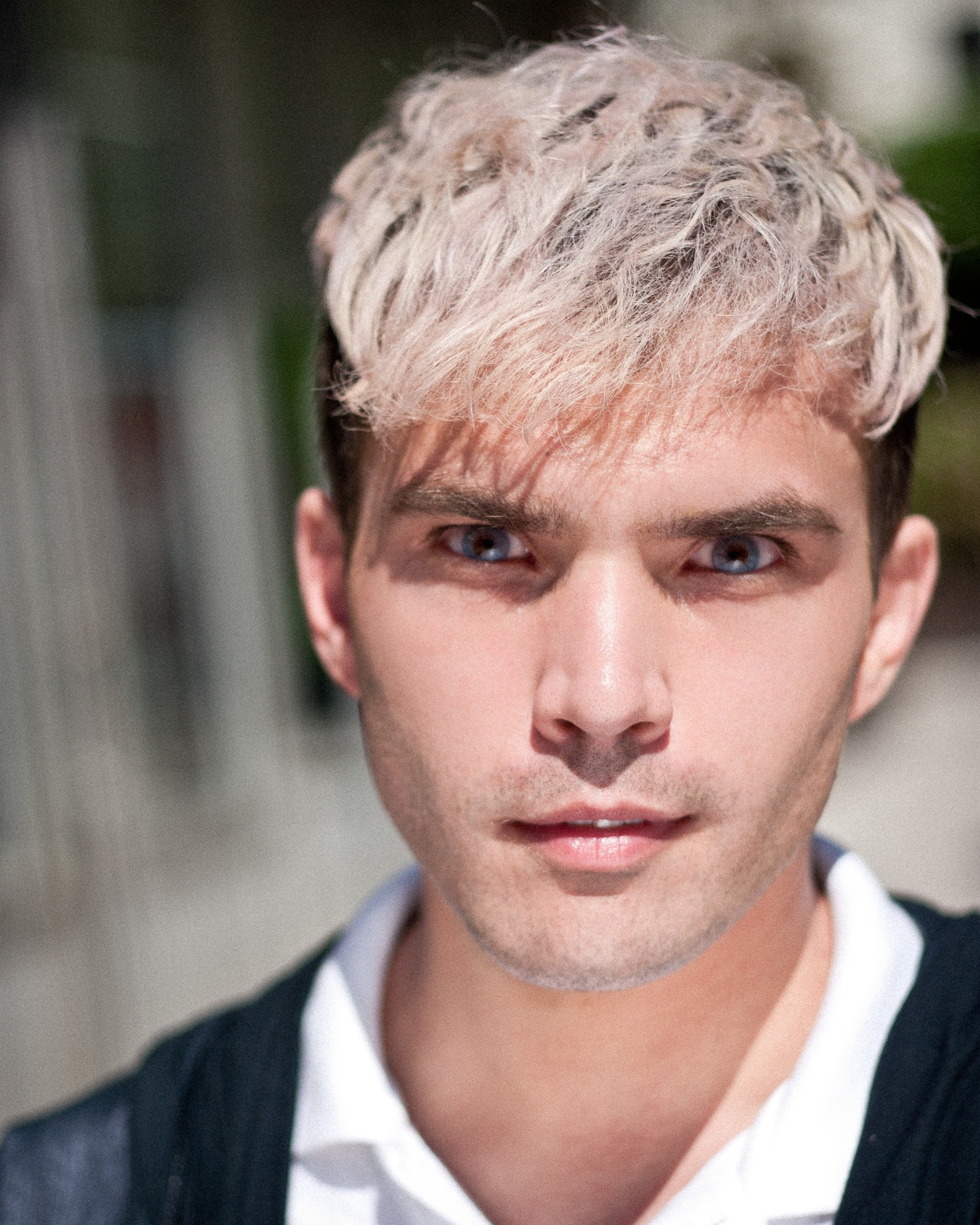
- JJ Brine

Background information
- Born: Jonathan Friel; November 8, 1982; Portland, Oregon, US
- Died: June 13, 2021 (aged 38) Gainesville, Florida, US
- Occupations: installation artist; filmmaker; singer-songwriter
- Years active: 2010–2021
- Label: DrugLord Records

JJ Brine (born Jonathan Friel) was an American visual artist and gallerist. The artist went by the title "The Crown Prince of Hell." He operated and curated the Vector Gallery in New York City, which drew attention and critical response for its avant-garde postmodern multimedia narratives on Abrahamic religions. The gallery attracted controversy as "The official art gallery of Satan" and purported to operate as a sovereign nation with its own time zone, theology, and community of adherents, Vectorians. Some refer to the gallery as a cult, and to Brine in turn as a cult leader. In an interview with V Magazine, Brine clarified that Vector is not a cult. "We're really a group of close friends. We have the same religion, but we practice it differently. The practice of our religion is making art." Brine & the Vector Gallery were often likened to a Millennial Andy Warhol meets GG Allin.

The NYC location closed when Brine traveled to Tanna, Vanuatu and opened for a period on Beverly Boulevard in Los Angeles. The press reported Brine's intentions to move Vector from LA to Washington, DC during the American presidential election season. The final incarnation of the Vector Gallery opened in the fall of 2017 at 951 Grand Street in Brooklyn and closed in September 2018.

== Early life ==
Brine was born in Portland, Oregon, he was adopted hours after being born. His biological mother is part Puerto Rican. When he was three his family moved to Gainesville, Florida where he spent his formative years. Brine graduated Cum laude in Political science from University of Florida. He later attended graduate school at American University of Beirut focusing on Middle Eastern politics & foreign affairs. He was also an assistant to former National Security Advisor Brent Scowcroft in Washington, D.C. Earlier, he interned for the American-Turkish Council.

== Art and career ==
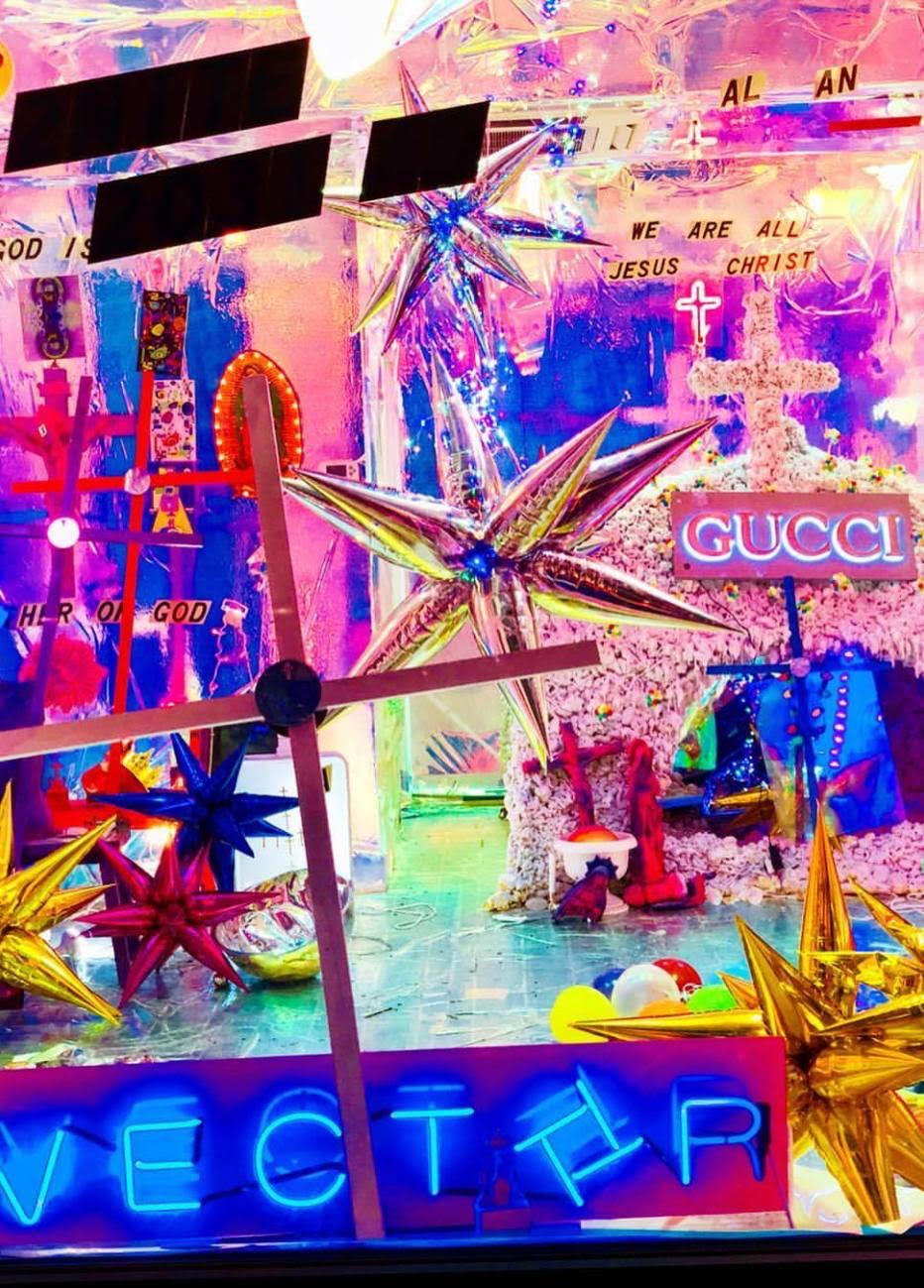
Vector Gallery 2018

In 2010 Brine moved to New York City. Inspired by his love for The Velvet Underground & Nico he chose to take residence on St Marks Place in the East Village. Brine pursued music releasing a 2012 album "President of Mozambique". He later formed the band The LaBiancas with fellow performance artist & frequent collaborator Lena Marquise.

=== Vector Gallery ===
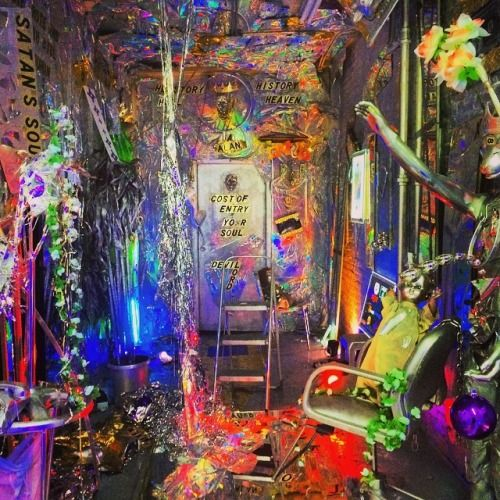
Vector Gallery - New York City

On July 15, 2013, Brine opened Vector Gallery on 40 Clinton Street on the Lower East Side of Manhattan. The venue lost its lease at the end of May 2014 and the gallery relocated to 154 East Broadway 11 days later. The second space contained a backroom signposted, "Cost Of Entry Your Soul."

Critics praised Brine's work for its originality and vision and it was compared to Andy Warhol's Factory by The Huffington Post ("Look: Is this the Next Warhol Factory?") but the gallery has been a subject of controversy for many neighborhood residents due to its occult theme and Brine's intense imagery of Satanism and Charles Manson and fringe elements have connected Brine's work to the Illuminati. Guestofaguest.com described the installation: "Is it the lair of a mad scientist? An occult apothecary? A wonderland of neon worship? Well, it's sort of all that (and more) rolled up into one unique gallery space, run by resident artist JJ Brine." OracleTalk.com also wrote, "Implementing cool DIY principle and conjuring references to Duchamp's ready-mades and rollicking religious iconography, the Vector Gallery is a gushing cornucopia of hypnotizing elements, provocative subject matter and lots of mirrors." Vice's Mitchell Sunderland called it "one of the last original places on the Lower East Side." Urban Resource has also called Vector the "most controversial art gallery" in New York City.

On October 16, 2013, Vector celebrated the 75th birthday of The Velvet Underground chanteuse Nico with "Time Doesn't Move."

"Vector Gallery is a gift of creativity to New York, instead of another place to buy stuff," wrote Art Nerd New York's Lori Zimmer. The gallery has also been described as being "among contemporary art's foremost installation spaces."

Brine and the ministers of Vector began holding a series religious services as performance art at the gallery on February 1, 2014.

Brine was sponsored by Select Fair in conjunction with Art Basel Miami Beach 2014 and opened Vector Gallery on site. Part of the gallery's participation included "Body As Commodity", an installation in which Lena Marquise (Vectorian minister of state), charged cellular devices with her vagina. Famed. Musical artist Usher visited the Vector booth on December 3, 2014, and participated by charging his cell phone inside the installation. It was the top news story generated during the 2014 Art Basel. The Vector Gallery Art Basel installation was also featured on The Real Housewives of New York City and TMZ on TV.

Brine was also one of the last guests featured on East Village Radio's final hours of broadcasting on the Andrew Andrew show, where Brine performed The Ritual of Infinite Names, or "AlanN". The hosts said that Vector closing its Clinton street location was "almost as important as CBGB's," and that the interview was "the last, and possibly the best" of their decade-long series.

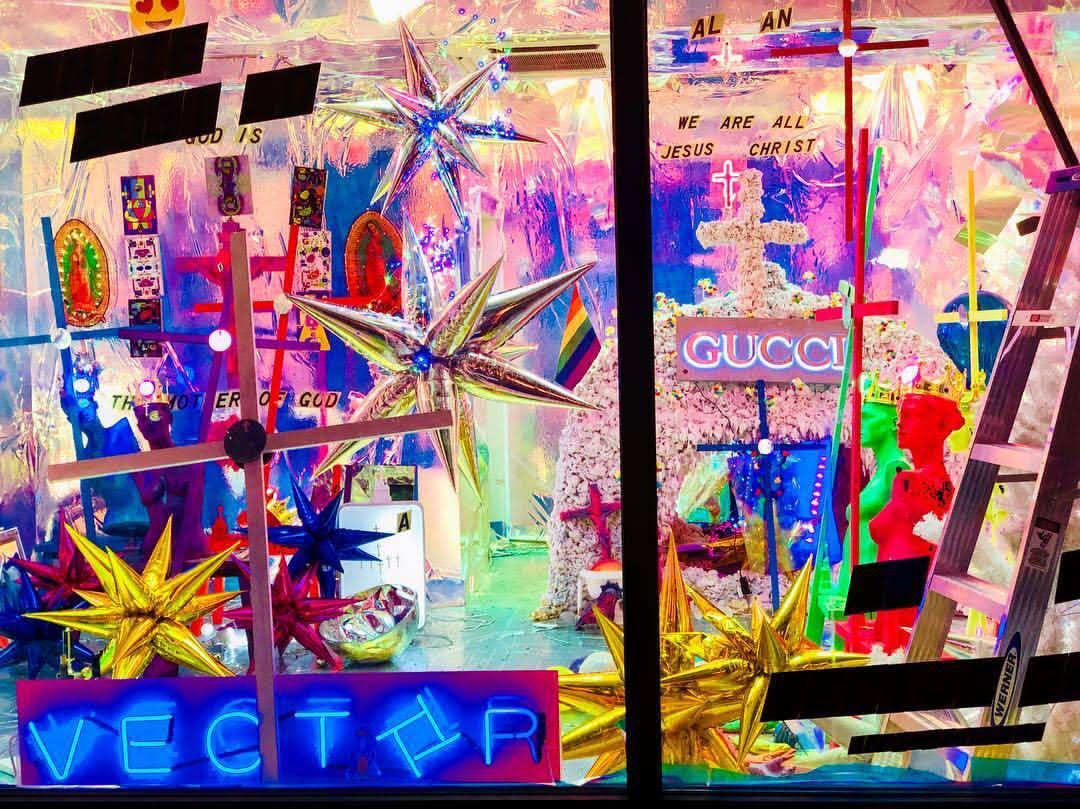
Brine's art installation at Vector Gallery 5.0 in the Bushwick neighborhood of Brooklyn, NY as of 2018

In April 2015 Brine announced the NOIR (Night Of Interior Restitution) Covenant, which detailed the means by which souls could be reclaimed and offered "an irreversible decline" to the city of New York.

In 2015, Brine was commissioned by clothing retailer Opening Ceremony to provide the space for their tribute to Gregg Araki's Doom Generation. Brine moved the Vector Gallery to Los Angeles in the summer of 2015. Vector Gallery opened at 8 pm, August 8, 2015 on Beverly Boulevard in Los Angeles, again generating attention from the art press and controversy and protests from local residents. On December 28, 2015 the Vector Gallery hosted "The Retrial Of Charles Manson", featuring Manson's alleged biological son Mathew Roberts. "The Retrial Of Charles Manson" was covered by media outlets such as TMZ. In 2015 Brine returned to Art Basel and was sponsored by The Satellite Show. His "Satanic Suicide Hotline" won ArtFCity's annual "Who Wore It Better" critique. After closing the gallery in Los Angeles, Brine announced plans to open it in Washington, DC "to program the elections, to make my commentary on them."

The Vector Gallery moved back to New York City with its fourth incarnation opening in August 2016 at 199 E. 3rd Street in the East Village. The Vector Gallery endured an electrical fire in January 2017; the gallery sustained minor danger. During the "Bravana: Middle East Peace Mass" on March 1, 2017 (which also happened to be Ash Wednesday) an onlooker on the street called 911, mistaking controlled flames being used in the mass for a fire. The FDNY showed up with three trucks and over 20 fire fighters to shut down the small gallery space for the night. On March 31, 2017, New York City Buildings Department filed complaints that the Vector Gallery was "being used illegally for religious assembly". The East Village location of the Vector Gallery closed on July 1.

The fifth incarnation of the Vector Gallery, dubbed "Vector V: The official art gallery of Jesus Christ", was slated to open at 951 Grand Street in the Bushwick neighborhood of Brooklyn on November 16, 2017.

Brine referred to his installations as "Shrines" and his exhibits combine performance art and visual narrative and his work has been compared to that of Marcel Duchamp and Andy Warhol.

=== Vectorian faith ===
Vector has its foundations in the Abrahamic traditions of Judaism, Christianity, and Islam. Brine described Vector as the fourth chapter and final chapter in a tetralogy preceded by the Torah, Bible and the Quran. Although Vector presents itself as "the official art gallery of Satan", the supreme Vectorian deity is identified as ALAN. Brine described the lemniverse as a "temporal-spatial simulation experiment". ALAN communicates with other "embodied fragments of its will" through the experiments in the simulation. Brine predicted the world will end in 2033 AD through the simultaneous annihilation of all life on earth, or the return to ALAN.

== In popular culture ==
JJ Brine has been called "an icon of post-American America." In September 2015, Vice ran an article depicting an event in which Brine and his Vectorian Government placed a curse on Kentucky county clerk Kim Davis, citing her refusal to issue gay marriage certificates as the motive for the ritual. Brine's art has been praised by underground filmmakers John Waters and Bruce LaBruce. Brine's occultism has drawn the attention of conspiracy theorists, who believe he is part of a new world order global conspiracy.

== Personal life ==
Brine was gay. His friendship with actress Amanda Bynes garnered international tabloid attention in 2014. Brine spent the COVID-19 pandemic living at home with his elderly parents. Brine died unexpectedly on June 13, 2021, in Gainesville, Florida at the age of 38.

== Music ==
Brine described his music as "electronic spirit music," or ESM, which refers to the channeling of spirits.

In addition to his solo project, he was also a member of the LaBiancas, a Charles Manson concept band, along with bandmate Lena Marquise.

=== Studio albums ===
- President of Mozambique (2012, DrugLord Records)

With The LaBiancas

- Charles Manson is Jesus Christ (2013, DrugLord Records)

=== Singles ===
- "Monarch Butterfly" (2012, DrugLord Records)

With the LaBiancas

- Charles in Charge (2013, DrugLord Records)
- Charles Manson is Jesus Christ (2013. DrugLord Records)
- I'll Never Say Never to Always (2013, DrugLord Records)
