= Kaan Kalyon =

Screenwriter

Kaan Kalyon is a Turkish American screenwriter and story development artist. He was the co-writer of Disney's Pocahontas (1995) and Hercules (1997), and the story artist in Treasure Planet (2002). In addition, Kalyon has worked with Sony and Columbia Pictures as the story artist for Surf's Up (2007) and Cloudy with a Chance of Meatballs (2009) and was the head of story for Hotel Transylvania (2012). He has also worked on several animated television series including Widget (1990), Tiny Toon Adventures (1991–92) and Bebe's Kids (1992).

== Early life and career ==
Of Turkish origin, Kalyon studied at California Institute of the Arts (1986–88) whilst working in a restaurant in Malibu, Los Angeles where he met Johnny Carson in the 1980s. Carson advised Kalyon to approach the Walt Disney Studios with the figures he drew on the back of the restaurant tickets. Kalyon later signed a contract with Walt Disney Film Studios and began his first project with The Lion King (1994). He later worked on Pocahontas (1995), Hercules (1997) and Treasure Planet (2002) before working for Sony and Columbia Pictures where he was a story artist for Surf's Up (2007), Cloudy with a Chance of Meatballs (2009) and Hotel Transylvania (2012).
