= American-Turkish Council =

Business association

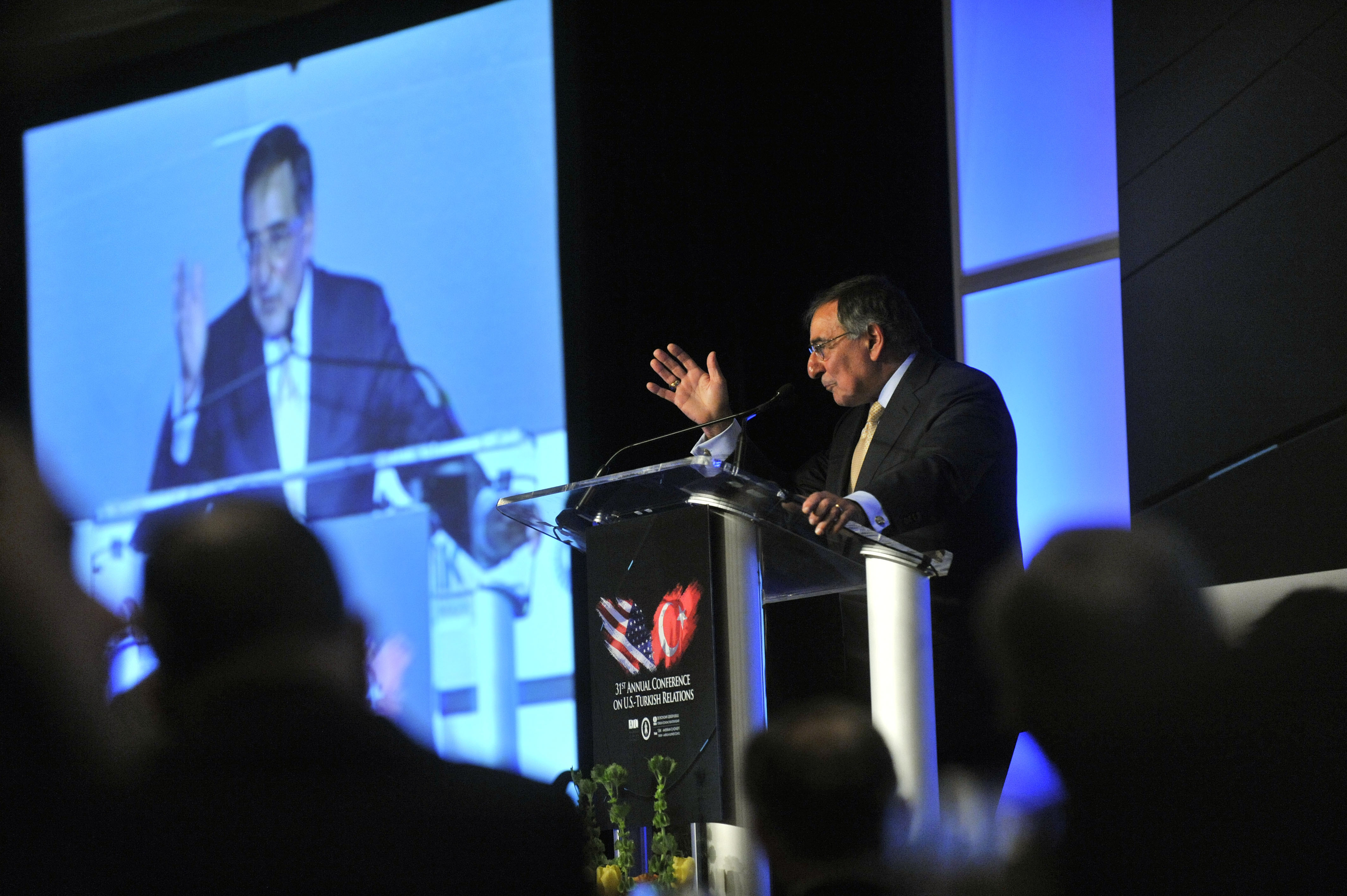
Secretary of Defense Leon E. Panetta delivers the keynote address at the 31st American Turkish Council Conference Dinner in Washington, D.C., on June 11, 2012

The American-Turkish Council (ATC) is a business association dedicated to enhancing the promotion of US-Turkish commercial, defense, technology, and cultural relations. Its diverse membership includes Fortune 500s, multinationals, U.S. and Turkish companies, non-profit organizations, and individuals with an interest in U.S.-Turkey relations. Guided by member interests, the ATC strives to enhance growing ties between the U.S. and Turkey by increasing investment and trade through high level government relations, effective commercial engagement, and bilateral cultural education. It has been described as "a 'Turkey lobby' in Washington".

== Personnel ==
- General James L. Jones: Chairman
- Howard Beasey: President and CEO
- Fatih Orhan: Director, Membership Development and Programs
- Ruya Eichelberger: Director, Communications and Marketing
- Zabe Shafi: Lead Program Associate
- Kemal Çankaya: Analyst, Finance
- Zeynep Ergin: Analyst, Program and Research

=== Board ===
As of 2014 the ATC board members included:

1. Richard Armitage
2. George Perlman of Lockheed Martin
3. Hamdi Ulukaya, CEO of Chobani
4. Elizabeth Avery of PepsiCo
5. Özer Baysal of Pfizer
6. Andy Button of Boeing
7. Richard K. Douglas of General Electric
8. Sherry Grandjean of Sikorsky Aircraft Corporation
9. John R. Miller of Raytheon
10. Selig A. Taubenblatt of Bechtel

ATC's advisory board also includes representatives of a number of defense, pharmaceutical, consulting, and technology firms, including BAE Systems and Motorola.

The American-Turkish Council holds a Joint Annual Conference with the Turkey-U.S. Business Council (TAİK) every year in Washington D.C.

== Controversies ==
Growing media scrutiny of the ATC came as a result of allegations made by FBI whistleblower Sibel Edmonds regarding the activities of council members in an article in the September 2005 Vanity Fair. The improprieties were alleged to be illegal contributions to the Congressional Black Caucus Foundation. The ATC is where former Ambassador Joseph Wilson met his future wife and CIA operative, Valerie Plame, leading some to speculate Plame's CIA front company, Brewster-Jennings & Associates, was monitoring the same alleged nuclear trafficking of the ATC as Sibel Edmonds.

In 2014, James Holmes, ATC President since 2005, was forced to resign at the demand of Turkey's deputy prime minister Ali Babacan. ATC Deputy Head Canan Büyüküstün and Executive Manager Ayşe Sümer also submitted their resignations. This was a result of the ATC having issued a report citing media reports about the 2013 corruption probe in Turkey that had implicated members of the AKP Erdoğan government. Concerns were subsequently raised by Cüneyt Zapsu, former Erdogan advisor and executive member of the ATC's partner organization in Turkey, the Turkey-U.S. Business Council (TAİK), an arm of Turkey's Foreign Economic Relations Board. Further dislike of Holmes by the Turkish government was caused when at a discussion panel chaired by Holmes, AKP-affiliated journalists, acting as if they were still in Turkey where such behavior would be normal, refused to answer a question posed by a Zaman journalist. Holmes rebuked this refusal, insisting that the AKP-columnist answer.

== See also ==
- American Turkish Friendship Association
- Assembly of Turkish American Associations
- Federation of Turkish American Associations
- Lobbying in the United States
- Turkish Americans
