= Assembly of Turkish American Associations =

Turkish-American advocacy and Armenian genocide denial group

- Türk Amerikan Dernekleri Kurultayı (Turkish)
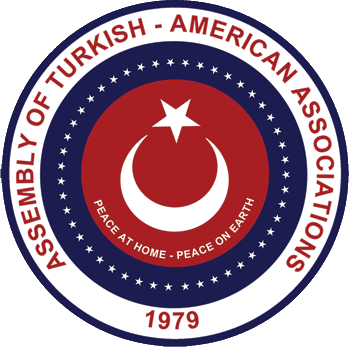
- Abbreviation: ATAA
- Formation: 1979
- Founder: Ülkü Ülgür
- Type: Non-Profit NGO
- Headquarters: Alexandria, Virginia
- Coordinates: 38°48′52.21″N 77°8′12.36″W
- Website: https://www.ataa.org/

The Assembly of Turkish American Associations (ATAA), created in 1979, is the umbrella organization whose stated purpose is to promote cooperation between the social and cultural Turkish American organizations around the United States. ATAA informs the Turkish American community on how to foster Turkish-American relations and promotes a positive view of Turkey.

== Background ==
ATAA was initially established by the Turkish state in 1979 to counter the Armenian lobby in the United States, receiving funding from the Turkish government.

ATAA undertakes educational workshops and seminars and conferences on political, social and economic issues concerning Turkey, runs cultural events promoting Turkey's cultural heritage, and publishes reference material regarding Turkey and the Turkish American community.

Activities include educational seminars for Turkish American communities on advocacy and civic leadership; conferences on political, social and economic issues related to Turkey and US Turkish relations; and cultural events to promote Turkey's traditions, art, and heritage.

ATAA publishes reference material on issues regarding the Turkish American community. One of its publications is the quarterly magazine "The Turkish American".

== Armenian genocide denial ==
The organization opposes teaching about the Armenian genocide in US schools and universities and has filed unsuccessful lawsuits arguing that the First Amendment requires Armenian genocide denial to be taught as a legitimate alternate view. In 2007 the head of the organization condemned the recognition of the Armenian genocide by the Anti-Defamation League.

== See also ==
- American-Turkish Council
- American Turkish Friendship Association
- Federation of Turkish American Associations
- Turkish American Community Center
- Lobbying in the United States
- Turkish Americans
