= Pınar Yoldaş =

Turkish-American architect, artist and researcher

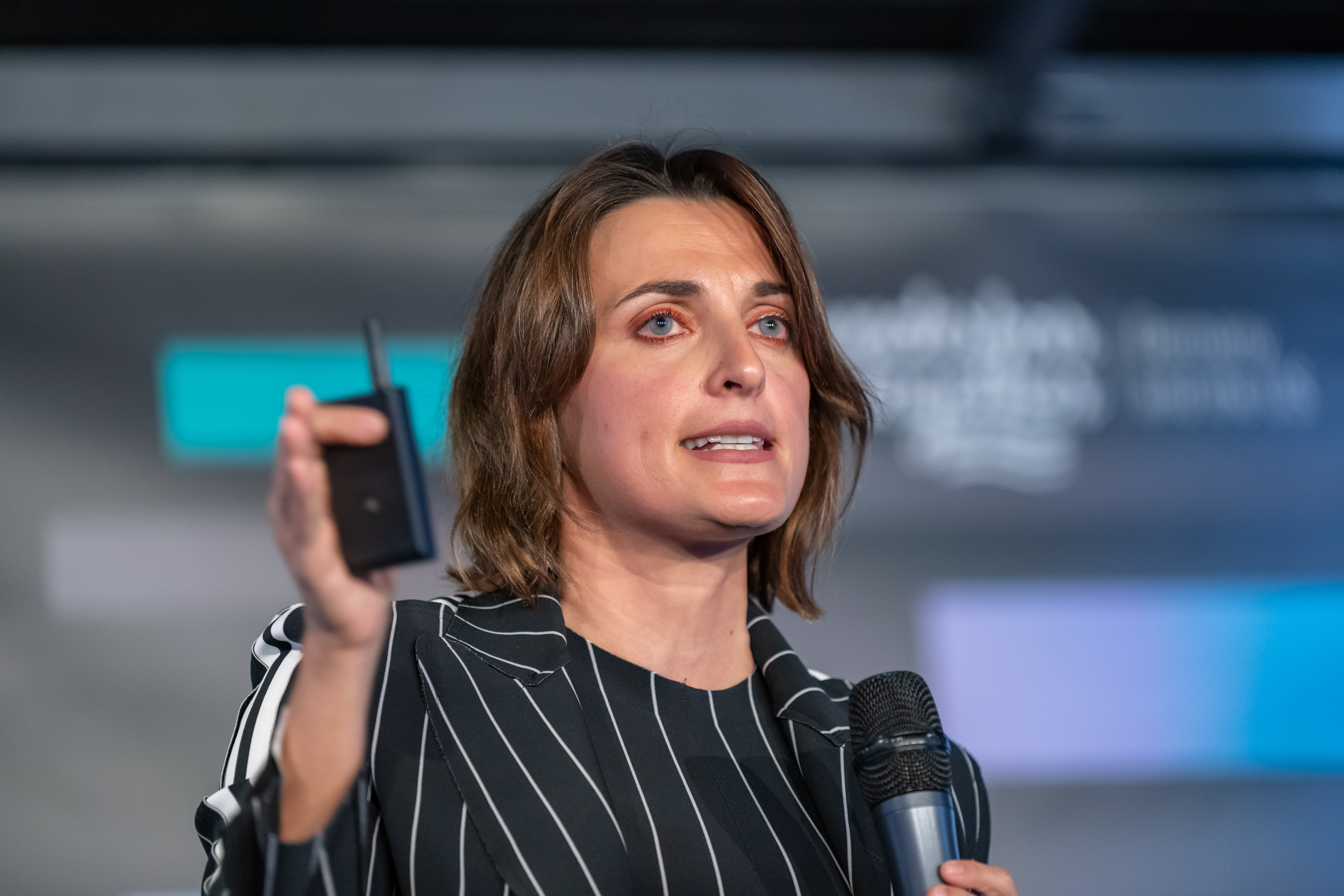
- Yoldaş in 2019
- Born: Denizli, Turkey
- Awards: Guggenheim Fellowship, MacDowell Colony Fellow

Pinar Yoldas (Pınar Yoldaş, Turkish pronunciation: pɯnar joɫˈdɑʃ) is a Turkish-American architect, artist and professor at University of California San Diego. She is known for art and architecture that focus on the anthropocene, futurism, and feminist technoscience.

Yoldas highlights the term "speculative biology" in comparison to experimental architecture of the 1990s, as design of tissues, organs, organisms, biological systems, ecotypes and ecosystems in order to catalyze creative critical thinking. Her process merges hand drawing and sculpting with bio-engineering and digital technologies.

She is a Guggenheim fellow and a MacDowell Colony fellow.

== Early life ==
Yoldas was born in Denizli, Turkey, to an architect father and physicist mother. She had a solo painting exhibition at the age of five in Denizli Public Library, giving her the title youngest painter to have an exhibition in Turkey alongside renowned painter Bedri Baykam who had his first exhibition at the age of six. Yoldas attended Izmir Science College where she was awarded a bronze medal in the National Science Olympics organized by the Scientific and Technological Research Council of Turkey.

She received a degree in architecture at Middle East Technical University (2002). She moved to Istanbul in 2002 to receive an MA in visual communication design at Istanbul Bilgi University (2004) and an MS in Internet technologies at Istanbul Technical University (2006). In this period she worked as a children's book illustrator, painting tutor, programmer and graphic designer to support her education.

In 2006 she moved to Los Angeles to work with Casey Reas. In 2008 she graduated from UCLA Design Media Arts with an MFA in new media art. In 2016, she earned her Ph.D. in media arts and sciences from Duke University with her thesis titled Speculative Biologies: New Directions in Art in the Age of the Anthropocene.

== Artistic career ==
Yoldas started designing organisms at UCLA. Her first designs included fictitious sexual organs and organisms that could be plugged into male or female bodies. Her practice is informed by her heterogeneous background in arts, design and sciences, and involves mediating her research as a sensory experience for non-scientists.

Art and neuroscience

Yoldas' work emphasizes the role of neuroscience in understanding artistic experience. She received a certificate in cognitive neuroscience at Duke University, where she built the art installation "Limbique."

Environmentalism

According to Bruce Sterling, "the inquiry on the relationships between man and environment is central to the work of Pinar Yoldas." Her work The Very Loud Chamber Orchestra of Endangered Species calls attention to the concept of endangered species and the loss of biodiversity in relation to climate change. Global Warming Hot Yoga Studio offers a new type of yoga practice where practitioners are subject to heat coming from a large scale sign that reads "GLOBAL WARMING." An Ecosystem of Excess, Fool’s Fowl and Saltwater Heart are works that center around the ideas of disruption of natural systems by anthropogenic forces.

== Exhibitions ==
Solo exhibitions

- AlterEvolution at Ekavart Gallery in Istanbul (2013)
- An Ecosystem of Excess at Ernst Schering Project Space in Berlin (2014)
- The Warm, The Cool and The Cat at Röda Sten Konsthall in Göteborg (2016)

Group exhibitions

- Transmediale (2014)
- ExoEvolution at ZKM (2015)
- Regeneration Movement: Rethinking Technology in the Digital Age at National Taiwan Museum of Fine Arts (2016)
- 12x12 at Southeastern Center for Contemporary Art in Winston-Salem, North Carolina (2017)

== Awards ==
In 2015, Yoldas received the Guggenheim Fellowship in Fine Arts, with her project Distilling the Sky, which involves building an architectural structure to filter polluted air, turn it into ink and a series of performances centered around the ink-making process. Her other awards include Future Emerging Art and Technology Award and Ann Arbor Experimental Film Festival Gill Omen Art & Science Award.

== Selected works ==
- An Ecosystem of Excess
- Kitty AI: Artificial Intelligence for Governance

== Publications ==
- Speculative eds. Christopher O'Leary and Zach Blas, exhibition catalogue, 2011.
- Art in the Anthropocene: Encounters Among Aesthetics, Politics, Environments and Epistemologies, eds. Heather Davis and Etienne Turpin, Open Humanities Press, 2014.
- An Ecosystem of Excess, Argobooks, 2014.
