= Kitty AI: Artificial Intelligence for Governance =

2016 art project by Pinar Yoldas

Kitty AI: Artificial Intelligence for Governance is a 2016 art project by artist and researcher Pinar Yoldas. It is a 12-minute 3D animation.

The work imagines a future where artificial intelligence takes over politics and an AI kitten becomes the first non-human governor in the year 2039. Kitty AI takes the format of a 3D animation where a digital kitten introduces itself as the first AI governor with extensive affective capacities such as being capable of loving millions of people, and delivers a speech about the grounds on which networks of artificial intelligence replace politicians.

The work both humorously and critically engages with a dystopian future which is given rise by some contemporary problems that concern global politics, such as climate change and population displacement. It also points to the uncanny intersections of algorithmic or machinic intelligence with the question of emotions.

Kitty AI has been exhibited in a number of venues such as Zorlu Center PSM in Istanbul (2017), Haus der Kulturen der Welt in Berlin (2017), STUK House for Dance, Image and Sound in Levuven (2017), Transfer Gallery in Brooklyn, New York (2017), as well as in Ann Arbor Film Festival in Michigan (2017).
