= Osman Kibar =

Turkish-American biotech entrepreneur

Osman Kibar is a Turkish American billionaire. He is the founder of the biotechnology firm Biosplice.

== Early life and education ==
Kibar was born in İzmir, Turkey, as the grandson of Osman Kibar, who was the mayor of İzmir from 1964 to 1973. His father, Seli Kibar, was an economist.

He attended İzmir Gazipaşa Primary School and then Robert College. For college, he moved to the United States to attend a 3-2 program, studying economics at Pomona College and electrical engineering at Caltech, and receiving a bachelor's degree from both. He did his master's degree and doctorate on biophotonics at UC San Diego.

== Career ==
In the late 1990s, when he was finishing his doctorate, he invented a cancer diagnosis system, which he turned into a company called Genoptix. The company went public a few years later, and was purchased by Novartis in 2011 for $476 million.

After completing his education, Kibar moved to New York City, where he worked for the hedge fund sponsor Pequot Capital.

He subsequently moved back to San Diego and in August 2011 founded a biotechnology company named Wintherix with an investment of $3.5 million from his friend Cevdet Samikoğlu. He later renamed the company Samumed, and subsequently Biosplice. Its investors include Ali Sabancı and Ergun Özen. The company researches cures for articular cartilage damage, hair loss, degenerative disc disease, lung tissue regeneration, cancer, psoriasis, damaged tendons, and Alzheimer's disease.

As of November 2020, Kibar has a net worth of $2.9 billion. He ranked eighth on Forbes Turkey's 2017 list of the 100 richest Turks.

== Personal life ==
Kibar is married and has four children.

Despite his wealth, he spends money extremely frugally, saying that all the activities he enjoys, such as reading, playing go, and moviegoing, are free. Kibar is also a successful poker player, and won the first tournament he ever entered in 2006.
