= Jihan Zencirli =

Turkish-American artist

- Born: July 6, 1985 (age 41); Seattle, Washington
- Known for: Installation, Sculpture, Public Speaking, Creative Direction
- Movement: Installation art, Performance art, Sculpture
- Awards: Los Angeles Design Edge Award, London Design Medal

Jihan Zencirli (born July 6, 1985), also known professionally as Geronimo, is a Turkish-American visual artist known for large-scale installations, sculpture, performance and public art. She is known for monumental works using balloons and other inflatable forms. The New York Times described her work as “arguably the most recognizable public art installations in the country.”

Beginning in 2011, Zencirli developed a body of work that helped establish balloons as a contemporary artistic medium. Her installations have appeared at museums, cultural institutions, public spaces, festivals, and commercial developments throughout North America, Europe, Asia, and Australia. Her work has been featured in publications including The New York Times, Architectural Digest, Wallpaper, Surface, Dezeen, Vogue, and Fast Company.

== Career ==
Around 2010, while serving as Creative Director of The NED Show, a children's character education company, Zencirli began experimenting with oversized balloons left over from a production project. She created a floating balloon installation for a friend's birthday celebration, and photographs of the work led to requests for similar installations. The experience marked the beginning of her artistic practice under the name GERONIMO.

In 2011, Zencirli founded GERONIMO in Los Angeles, developing a body of work that approached balloons not as decorative objects but as sculptural materials for contemporary installation art. Although balloons had previously appeared in contemporary art, Zencirli's practice is considered the first to consistently employ them as the primary material for architectural-scale public installations, contributing to the recognition of balloons as a medium within contemporary installation art.

Her early installations gained international attention through design publications and social media, leading to commissions for museums, cultural institutions, retailers, hospitality groups, and public spaces. Over the following decade, Zencirli became known for creating large-scale, site-specific installations that transformed architecture and civic environments into immersive public artworks.

Working at architectural scale, her installations frequently combine color, movement, and ephemeral materials to encourage public participation while exploring themes of celebration, memory, impermanence, and collective experience. Her work has been exhibited internationally and includes commissions for institutions and organizations including The Broad, New York City Ballet, Rockefeller Center, Greenwich Peninsula in London, Melbourne Design Week, and numerous public art and cultural projects throughout North America, South America, Europe, Asia, Africa, and Australia.

Writing in The New York Times, Sandra E. Garcia described Zencirli's work as creating "arguably the most recognizable public art installations in the country." Her installations have since been featured by publications including Architectural Digest, Wallpaper, Surface, Dezeen, Fast Company, Forbes, and Vogue.

Alongside her independent artistic practice, Zencirli has collaborated with organizations across fashion, technology, hospitality, and the performing arts, creating large-scale public installations, immersive environments, and creative campaigns for brands and cultural institutions.

Beginning in the early 2020s, Zencirli expanded her practice beyond public installation into creative direction, digital art, and cultural strategy. She served as Global Strategist for Doodles, where she helped shape the company's creative direction, cultural positioning, experiential programming, strategic partnerships, and global public activations as it evolved from an NFT project into an entertainment and consumer brand. She was succeeded in the company's senior creative leadership by Pharrell Williams, who currently serves as the company's Chief Brand Officer.

== Selected exhibitions and public commissions ==
Year	Project	Venue / Institution	Location
2016	Anniversary Installation	The Broad	Los Angeles, California
2017	NYC Pride Installation	NYC Pride	New York, New York
2018	Art Series	New York City Ballet at Lincoln Center	New York, New York
2018	Sculpture Residency	Pier 17, South Street Seaport	New York, New York
2018	David & Gladys Wright House Installation	David & Gladys Wright House	Phoenix, Arizona
2018	Melbourne Design Week Installations	National Gallery of Victoria	Melbourne, Australia
2018	London Design Festival Installation	London Design Festival	London, England
2018	How We Gather	NOW Gallery, Greenwich Peninsula	London, England
2019	Solari Summer	David Yurman / Madison Square Park	New York, New York
2019	The Mirrored Forest	Downtown Los Angeles	Los Angeles, California
2019	Extra Extra Terrestrial	The Standard	Los Angeles, California
2019	Installation for Salone del Mobile	Versace / Salone del Mobile	Milan, Italy
2019	The Tide	Greenwich Peninsula	London, England
2021–present	Public Installations	Rockefeller Center	New York, New York
2022–2023	Public Activations and Installations	Doodles	International

== Exhibition and Performance ==
In addition to her public art installations, Zencirli has created immersive exhibitions, performances, and interdisciplinary works that combine installation, theater, music, and audience participation.

In 2017, Zencirli created and presented My Grandfather Is the Yogurt Bomber, an immersive theatrical work staged at CBS Studio in Los Angeles. The performance combined storytelling, visual art, and live performance, with contributions from artist James Jean and comedian Ramy Youssef.

In 2018, Zencirli presented Notes to Self, a site-specific installation at The Standard, Downtown LA.

Her image and work has also appeared in advertising campaigns, television, film, and live performance, including projects for Google, Instagram, Mercedes-Benz International, Tampax, General Motors, Airbnb, Square, T-Mobile, Squarespace, and HBO.

Beginning January 2018, Zencirli was invited by New York City Ballet to create signature installations for their annual Art Series. As the first female collaborator selected, Zencirli inflated more than 200,000 compostable, biodegradable balloons in a series of installations and collaborative choreography at the Ballet’s home at Lincoln Center. Previous years' artists included french political artist JR, Dustin Yellin and Marcel Dzama.

In July 2019, on London's Greenwich Peninsula, along the Thames River path, an elevated walkway designed by Diller Scofidio + Renfro, Zencirli installed 25 sculptures along the route, with additional sculptures by British artists Damien Hirst and Allen Jones and Antony Gormley's Quantum Cloud. Yoko Ono's Wish Tree installation coincided as companion to the opening of Zencirli's sculptures.

== Public Interventions ==
Alongside her commissioned installations, Zencirli has created a number of independent public interventions and temporary site-specific works in Los Angeles and elsewhere. Often installed without advance announcement, these projects blur the boundaries between public art, performance, and social commentary.

Among these works are installations for the Hollywood Sunset Free Clinic, the Silver Lake Meadow, the Bates Motel, as well as projects created through Nefarious Frillers, an anonymous collective founded by Zencirli that installed temporary installation works throughout Los Angeles, Istanbul, Paris and Milan.

In 2016, following musician Father John Misty's widely publicized claim that he had stolen a rose quartz crystal from a Moon Juice store in Los Angeles, a 1.5-meter papier-mâché replica of the crystal appeared atop a building in Echo Park bearing the message, "Thank you Father John 4 Freeing Me." Father John Misty later shared an image of the sculpture, writing that the crystal was "free and loving life." The work remained anonymous until 2018, when it was revealed in an interview with New York magazine that Zencirli had fabricated and installed the sculpture on the roof of her studio.

== Personal life ==
Zencirli is twentieth generation Sufi, from the town of her surname, Zencirli, in Konya Province of Turkey, burial place of Rumi.

In Los Angeles, Zencirli owns the mixed-arts studio of Memphis Group founding member, Peter Shire.

== In the News ==
In 2017, Zencirli received the Edge award at the L.A. Design Festival for her significant contribution to the L.A.'s Design Culture.

In January 2019, Zencirli was reported to have an estimated net worth of $10,000,000, making her one of the highest earning female artists in the United States.
