= Lena Marquise =

Lena Marquise Елена Утина
- Born: February 25, 1985 (age 40); Russia
- Occupation(s): Installation Artist, Singer/Songwriter, Filmmaker
- Years active: 2000–present
- Labels: DrugLord Records
- Website: www.lenamarquise.com

Lena Marquise (Russian: Елена Утина; born February 24, 1985) is a Russian interdisciplinary artist based in New York. She started her career in the early 2000s. She works primarily within the disciplines of performance and video art. Her works have been known to push the boundaries of ethics and morals within the context of human sexuality in order to ask the audience how they feel, and why, stating, “I'm asking them to think about the piece itself rather than allowing the piece to become a spectacle.” As a professional dominatrix, she strives to reveal the different forms of sexuality apart from what is conventionally accepted. All her works are based on redefining sexuality and art, as publicly acknowledged by celebrity satirist Perez Hilton in stating on his confusion about Art, “We're not really sure how this is art, but it's awesome!” She is based in Brooklyn, New York.

== Performance ==
Her most notable performance was “Body As Commodity” performed at Art Basel Miami, at VECTOR Gallery, sponsored by Select Fair. The Huffington Post made note of the irony with which the piece gained international viral attention, “How artworks meant to call the unsavory aspects of culture into question often end up affirming them.” Proclaimed by VECTOR Gallerist JJ Brine to be a post human performance artist, she touches on post modernist concepts, “Yes, I think the piece speaks to how people are finding out about it. And how people are finding out about is itself a commentary."

Her work has called into question where art begins, and where it ends as sex culture blog Fleshbot wrote: “Maybe I'm a part of this gigantic art installation now, and by extension, so is everyone reading this…” Despite the controversial Not Safe For Work (NSFW) content of the physical portion of this piece as she described it to Cool Hunting as, "It may or may not actually be about prostitution." The work was billed as the top social post of Art Basel, with a majority of the posts focusing on musical artist Usher's participation in her installation, as summed up by a review by ArtNet News, “Unfortunately for both the artist and the gallerist, as the Internet sees it, Usher is still the star of this tale.” Since Basel 2014 Marquise has collaborated with artists, JJ Brine, Zefrey Throwell, Adrian Buckmaster and Caspar Petéus in variety of mediums.

== Body as commodity ==
Marquise sat without movement or emotion forcing the audience or participant to consider whether using a doll for sexual pleasure commodifies sex more or less immorally than using a real body for amenities that can be monetarily quantified, such as energy; the charging of a mobile phone. This performance uses the exchange of literal energy (battery life) for figurative energy (use of body) for money ($100/10min), to exemplify the exchange of simulated sexuality for monetary gain. The aim of this exchange is to challenge the audience, asking them to question how the social presentation of sexuality may be affecting their seemingly inherent moral standing. "Body As Commodity" was a live performance, documented with mobile phones by gallery and art fair attendees, and posted online; the photos taken spread virally over social media, reaching an apex within 48hrs of the performance, posted on conservative international YouTube channels, news publications and blogs. The performance which speaks on the objectification of a body, was objectified - being announced to the world as the 'woman's vagina which Usher used to charge his cell phone'. The global reaction has not only called into question 'what is Art?' but also, 'are we (the audience) now part of the art?'

By inserting a sexually explicit construct into a socially acceptable context, the audience participant is liberated from societal ethics in order to better assess their personal moral stance on the use of a body for personal gain. The aim of this exchange was to challenge the audience, asking them to question how the social presentation of sexuality may be affecting their seemingly inherent moral standing. The participant is also forced to reflect on the ability of their desire to become a need, how great their need for energy can become at times of impending technological dissonance (such as a dying mobile phone), and how it can eclipse the social ethics instilled in them.

== Video ==
As an actor, Marquise has owned and operated a number of artistic adult oriented content where she worked as director, producer, editor, and actor, Marquise set off to produce her own work, posting it under her new production company, including the infamous “Solo Ritual 1 (2011)” screened at the NYC Adult Film Festival in early 2015 alongside artists such as Zefrey Throwell, Narcissister, Richard Kern, and Miley Cyrus, and James Franco. In an interview with a German publication, she has revealed that “she wants the eroticism she creates to be more that just about arousal and entertainment, but the psychology of both as well.” Her work often covers the subjects of sex work and censorship, eliciting critical response for its controversial eroticism.

Lena Marquise and JJ Brine previously collaborated on an erotic Satanic short film The Visitor written by Brine and performed by Marquise, wherein the biblical Mary, who is played by Marquise, masturbates with a knife while chanting patriarchal verses as a commentary on mass genital mutilation in Egypt.

== Photographic ==
Maintaining a postmodernist approach to her work, Marquise recently released a new collection of prints she has created using text overlays paired with film stills she has produced, directed and acted in.

Marquise and Caspar Petéus collaborated on a photographic series entitled ALCHEMY: The Process, which was premiered at Black Box Gallery in Brooklyn, New York and sold at Saatchi Art and Art Slant.

Marquise and Peteus also previously collaborated on digital photographic works such as As Above So Below which was shown on Digital Sweat Gallery.

== Music ==
Marquise creates musical scores to accompany her video works. She is also a member of the LaBiancas, a Charles Manson concept band, along with bandmate JJ Brine.

=== Solo ===
- Film scores: 7am (Walk Towards Me)
- Short film: The Social Grace of Active Scalp Follicles”

== The LaBiancas ==
=== Studio albums ===
- Charles Manson is Jesus Christ (2013, DrugLord Records)

=== Singles ===
- Ultraviolence (Lana Del Rey Cover) (2015, Unreleased)
- Charles in Charge (2013, DrugLord Records)
- Charles Manson is Jesus Christ (2013. DrugLord Records)
- I'll Never Say Never to Always (2013, DrugLord Records)
