= Federation of Turkish American Associations =

The Federation of Turkish American Associations is a non-profit organization established in 1956 for the purpose of uniting and supporting the Turkish American community within the United States. The Federation has evolved with the changing times and has expanded in size, membership, and purpose since its founding.

== Members ==
The Federation today consists of over 63 member associations organizations with a majority of these groups located in the Northeast region of the United States. Member organizations consist of associations of different ethnic, technical, and social backgrounds including the Turkic nations (e.g. Azerbaijanis, Uzbeks, and Karachays). Each association serves to support its own members through various functions and events. The Federation operates as a conduit within the network of member organizations.

The Federation's organizational structure into 3 bodies: Board of Directors, Executive Committee and Inspection Committee.

Its President for the term 2014-2016 is Atilla Pak. Atilla Pak placed his candidacy for president again in 2016 and was victorious securing a majority vote via Board of Directors for the 2016–2018 term.

== Responsibilities ==
One of the main aims is to provide maximum exposure of Turkish culture, folklore, literature, music, history, and overall knowledge of Turkey to the United States public. This is achieved through cultural activities and other public relations activities throughout the United States such as a Turkish Parade.

A major responsibility is to provide support to the Turkish American community throughout the United States. This support includes the referral of individuals, both Turkish and non-Turkish, to qualified professionals.

== Business relations ==
The organization also tries to promote business relations between Turkish and non-Turkish companies that wish to conduct business with the Turkish community within the United States or abroad.

== Activities ==
It organized the traditional "Turkish Day Parade" and Festival in New York City on 19 May 2018.

== See also ==
- American Turkish Friendship Association
- Assembly of Turkish American Associations
- American-Turkish Council
- Lobbying in the United States
- Turkish American
- Turkish Women's League of America
