= An Ecosystem of Excess =

An Ecosystem of Excess is an art project by artist and researcher Pinar Yoldas. The project addresses a series of ecological problems such as man-made extreme environments, consumer capitalism, plastic pollution and threatened species in the age of the Anthropocene. Yoldas was awarded the Ernst Schering Foundation Arts & Culture Grant for her project, and An Ecosystem of Excess was premiered in Ernst Schering Project Space in Berlin in 2014.

The project is an artistic imagination of a post-anthropocene ecosystem where non-human living creatures are evolved to digest plastic while human species goes extinct. It portrays the future story of alien life forms that emerge from the Great Pacific Garbage Patch, in the form of a dystopian re-staging of Abiogenesis. For the project, Yoldas worked with marine biologist Sylvia Earle .

An Ecosystem of Excess is a work informed by scientific research which confirms the emergence of new bacteria which adapt to plastic environments or what is scientifically called the plastisphere, yet, it is a product of speculative fiction that takes inspiration but departs from science. It points to evolution and how this process is indirectly altered by human intervention in the age of Anthropocene. The work involves a creative exaggeration of scientific facts, and more generally, a research about "the collaborative potential between art and biological sciences." Artist-theorists Zach Blas and Christopher O'Leary describe the work as a design of "synthetic biological systems as a living critique of our society."

The project has been exhibited internationally, in venues such as ZKM Center for Art and Media Karlsruhe (2014), Aksioma Institute for Contemporary Arts in Slovenia (2014), NAMOC National Art Museum of Beijing (2014), Polytech Museum Moscow (2015), ISCP International Studio & Curatorial Program in New York (2015), National Taiwan Museum of Fine Arts (2016), BOZAR Center for Fine Arts in Brussels (2017) and Calit2 Gallery at UC San Diego (2017)

In May 2014, An Ecosystem of Excess was also published as a book by Argobooks.
