= Diyanet Center of America =

Nonprofit in the Washington, D.C. area

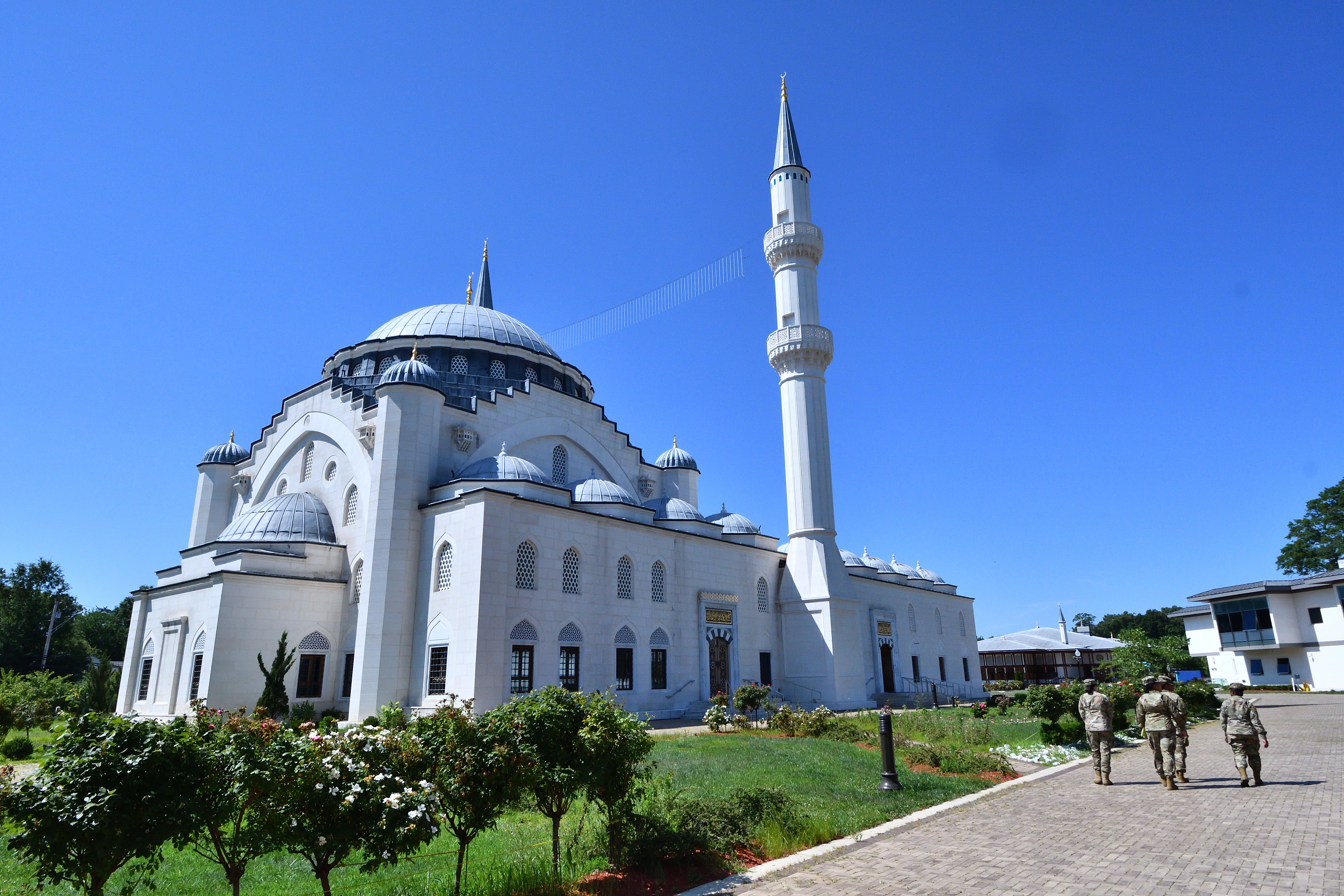
- Established: 1993; 33 years ago
- Founded at: Lanham, Maryland
- Coordinates: 38°59′02″N 76°50′38″W
- Parent organization: Diyanet
- Website: diyanetamerica.org

Diyanet Center of America (DCA) is a non-profit organization funded by the Turkish government that is based in Seabrook, Maryland, serving the needs of the Muslim community in the Washington metropolitan area. The center holds regular Friday congregational prayers, Ramadan dinners, religious holiday celebrations – including Mawlid – and various other social, cultural, and religious activities.

The center benefits from its proximity to the nation's capital, various federal and state institutions, and schools. The closest is NASA's Goddard Space Flight Center. The nearby New Carrollton station serves the Washington Metro, MARC, and Amtrak lines. Greyhound, a nationwide intercity bus company, also stops at the station.

The complex consists of five main buildings, an underground parking garage, and a geothermal well field on a 15-acre site. The five buildings are a mosque constructed using 16th century classical Ottoman architecture designed by Muharrem Hilmi Shenalp, a cultural center building in the Seljuk architectural style, a guest house, a fellowship hall with a restaurant and shops, and a recreational building housing a hamam (Ottoman bathhouse), an indoor pool, and a sports center.

== History ==
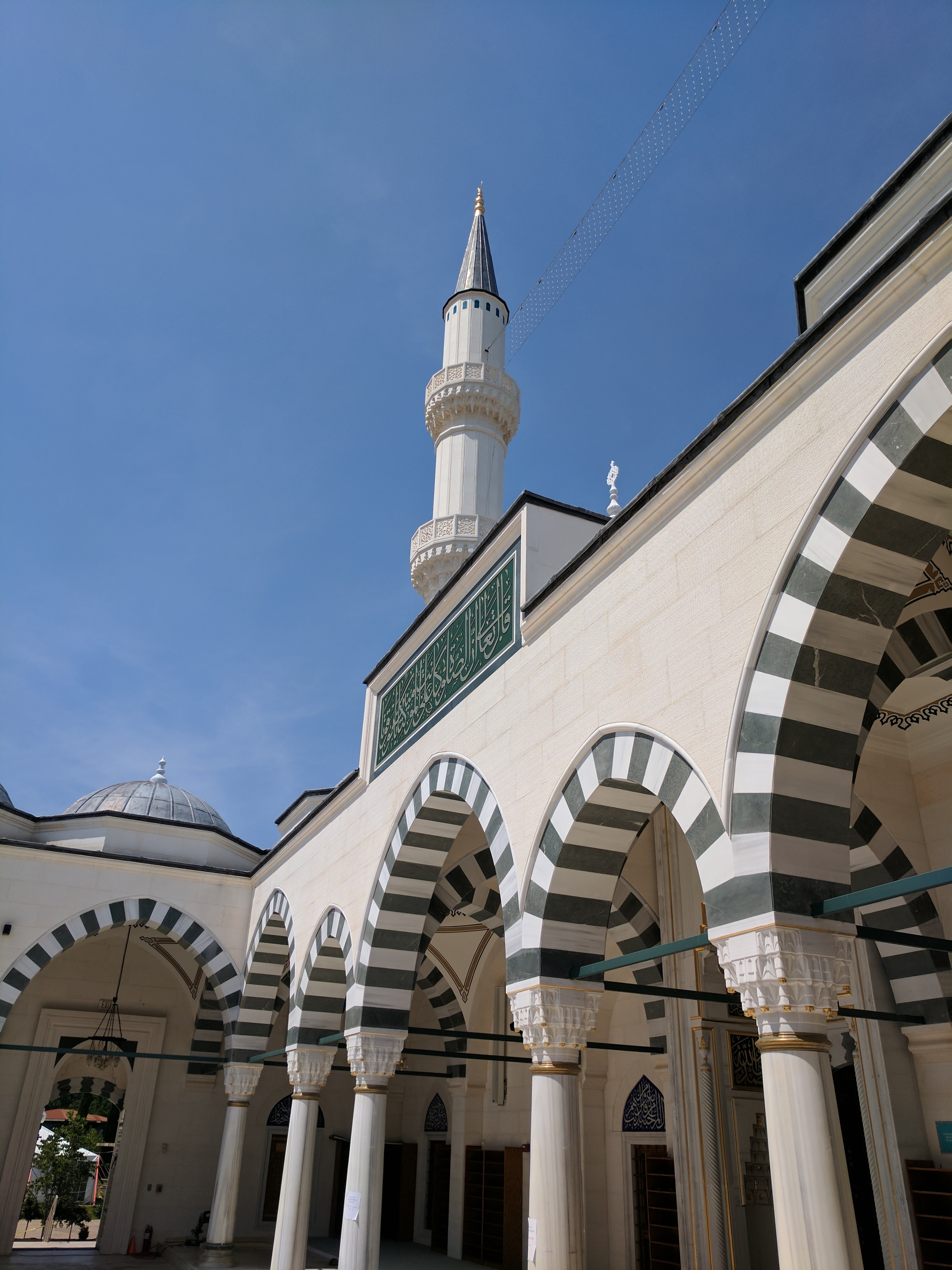
The DCA's mosque is built in the classical Ottoman style

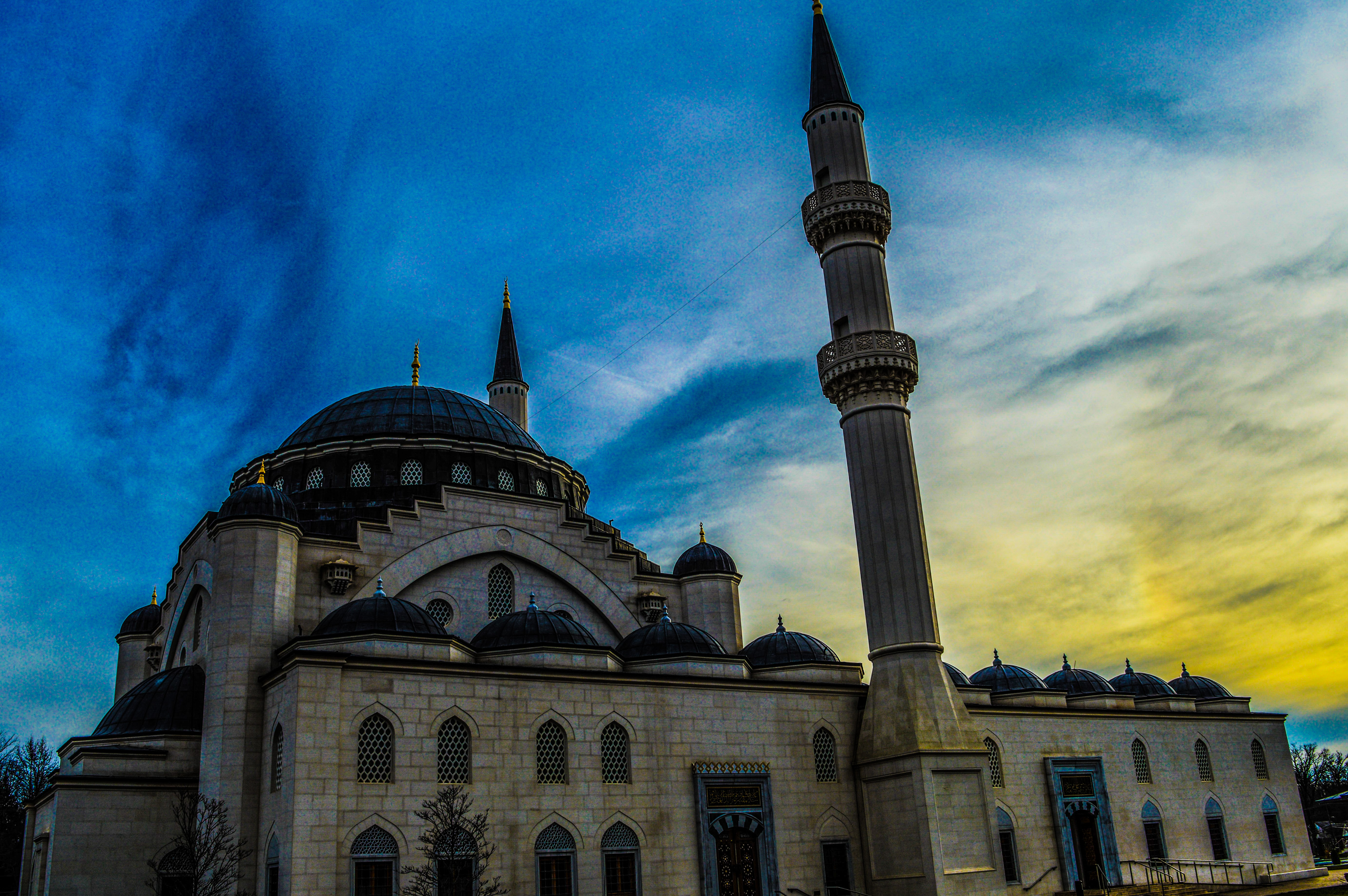
The mosque at the Diyanet Center of America

The organization was established as the Turkish American Islamic Foundation in 1993, and as the scope of services expanded it was renamed to the Turkish American Community Center (TACC) in 2003. After the completion of a comprehensive construction project, the center was renamed to its assumed business name of Diyanet Center of America, which receives major support from Directorate of Religious Affairs (Diyanet), an institution of the Government of Turkey. The result of the construction project is a small village that will be an important cultural hub for all visitors and residents of Washington D.C. area.

== Affiliated mosques ==
- Delaware Diyanet Mosque, New Castle, DE
- Ahıska Turks Community Center of Kentucky, Louisville, KY
- Springfield Imam Buhari Mosque, Indian Orchard, MA
- NJ Burlington County Muslim Association, Burlington, NJ
- Bergen Diyanet Mosque and Cultural Center, Cliffside Park, NJ
- Paterson Mevlana Mosque, Paterson, NJ
- Ulu Mosque of Paterson, Paterson, NJ
- Murat Mosque, Upper Pittsgrove, NJ
- Hamidiye Mosque, Willingboro, NJ
- American Association of Crimean Turks, Brooklyn, NY
- Eyüp Sultan Mosque, Brooklyn, NY
- Long Island Mevlana Mosque, Port Jefferson Station, NY
- Turkish Society of Rochester Mosque, Rochester, NY
- Turkish Islamic Cultural Center of Queens, Sunnyside, NY
- Diyanet Dallas Mosque, Dallas, TX

== See also ==
- List of mosques in the United States
- List of mosques in the Americas
- Assembly of Turkish American Associations
- Turkish House
