= Turkish Women's League of America =

The Turkish Women's League of America is an organization for Americans of Turkish origin, who are united in an effort to promote equality and justice for women.

== Causes ==
TWLA organizes cultural and recreational activities to foster better understanding between the people of Turkey, the United States, and other counties, including the new Turkic republics of the former Soviet Union; such as the Kazakhs, Uzbeks, and Kyrgyz people in the U.S. The organization also defends human and civil rights and operates an Atatürk School, which offers courses in the Turkish language, Folklore, Literature, Music, Dance and History.

== See also ==
- Federation of Turkish American Associations
