= Biosplice Therapeutics =

American biopharmaceutical company

- Type: Privately held company
- Industry: Regenerative medicine
- Founded: 2008; 18 years ago in San Diego, California, US
- Founder: Osman Kibar
- Fate: Renamed from Samumed
- Headquarters: San Diego, California, US
- Website: www.biosplice.com

Biosplice Therapeutics, Inc. (formerly Samumed, LLC) is a private biopharmaceutical company based in San Diego, California. It was founded in 2008 by Osman Kibar.

Samumed's products in development target novel components of the Wnt signaling pathway. The company focuses on potential treatments for several diseases; its osteoarthritis program is its most advanced.
