= American Turkish Society =

The American Turkish Society
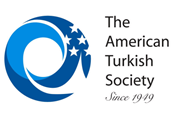
- Established: June 29, 1949; 76 years ago
- Mission: To enhance business, economic, and cultural and artistic ties between Turkey and the United States.
- Chair: Suzan Sabancı; Linda J. Wachner
- Address: 66 Meserole Avenue, Brooklyn
- Location: New York, United States
- Website: americanturkishsociety.org

The American Turkish Society (ATS) is a nonprofit and nonpartisan organization based in the United States that focuses on cultural and educational exchange between the United States and Turkey. The organization hosts lectures, workshops, symposia, conferences, festivals, performances, and exhibitions addressing topics related to Turkish–American relations and Turkish arts and culture in the United States.

Over several decades, the American Turkish Society has organized events related to diplomatic, cultural, and economic relations between Turkey and the United States. These events have included discussions and public programs featuring government officials, diplomats, and business representatives. The organization has also supported initiatives in areas such as education, culture and humanitarian assistance.

== History ==
=== Foundation ===
The American Turkish Society was founded on 29 June 1949 in New York by a group of eight individuals. Participants included Selim Sarper, Ernest Jackh, Asa Jennings, Lewis Owen, and Charles Wylie, together with three other Turkish representatives. The organization was established to promote relations between Turkey and the United States. Its founding took place during the early Cold War period, following developments such as the launch of the Marshall Plan in 1947 and the establishment of NATO in 1949.

Selim Sarper, the first president of the American Turkish Society, oversaw several initiatives during the 1950s. These included the establishment of a Center for Turkish Studies at Columbia University within the Near and Middle East Institute.

The society also organized a Turkish arts exhibition in cooperation with the Metropolitan Museum of Art and the Turkish government. The exhibition was presented in several cities in the United States.

During the same period, the organization supported humanitarian and community activities, including a blood donation campaign for troops serving in the Korean War and assistance to Turkish expellees from Bulgaria. The society also established a branch in Washington, D.C. and cooperated with the Turkish-American Women's Cultural Society in Ankara.

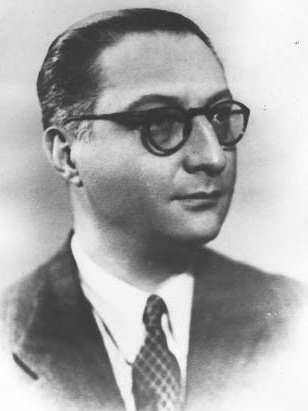
Selim Sarper, founder and first president of the American Turkish Society

=== 1960s to 1990s ===
In 1961, the American Turkish Society established a permanent office with staff. The first meeting of its board of directors at the new office was held on Madison Avenue in New York. Betty R. Guyer was appointed the organization’s first assistant secretary. During the following years, the society expanded its membership and organized a range of events and activities. By the mid-1960s, membership had increased to 263.

During the 1970s, the American Turkish Society reported 263 individual members and 47 corporate members. Corporate members included companies such as Philip Morris, which joined in 1977.

The society organized events during this period, including an annual luncheon held in 1974 at The Pierre. Speakers at the event included Turkish businessmen Nejat F. Eczacıbaşı and Vehbi Koç.

In 1979, the organization reorganized its leadership structure and appointed Ahmet Ertegun, founder of Atlantic Records, as chairman. He held the position until his death in 2006.

In the early 1980s, the American Turkish Society organized programs related to Mustafa Kemal Atatürk, including discussions on his influence on visual arts, contemporary interpretations of his legacy, and the status of women during his presidency.

In 1983, when Turgut Özal became prime minister of Turkey, the society organized the Annual American Turkish Business Conferences, which had begun the previous year and focused on economic relations between Turkey and the United States.

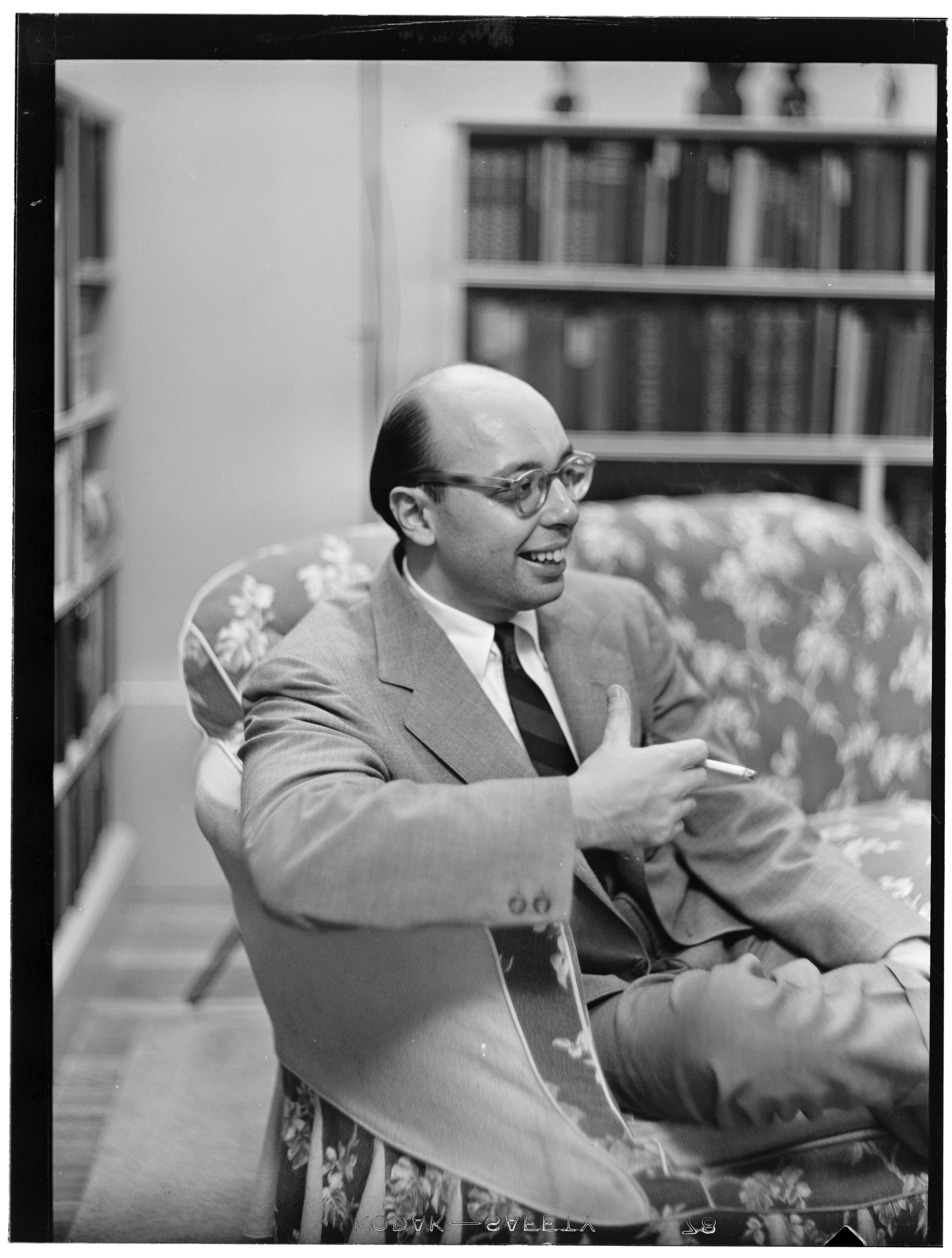
Ahmet Ertegün, longest-serving president of ATC

During the 1990s, the American Turkish Society cooperated with other nongovernmental organizations on a range of programs. Following the 1999 İzmit earthquake in Turkey, the society participated in humanitarian initiatives including the Life Project and the Sister School Project. These efforts also included support for the construction of the Yalova Elementary School and the Yeni Mahalle Day Care Center.

Public programs organized by the society during this period included appearances by Turkish political figures such as Süleyman Demirel, Tansu Çiller, and Turgut Özal.

=== Recent history ===
In 2006, the American Turkish Society began hosting its Annual Gala, which included recognition of collaborations between American and Turkish companies. The first gala included a tribute to the 50-year partnership between Ford Motor Company and Koç Holding.

In 2006, Arif Mardin, the vice-chairman of the American Turkish Society, died on 25 June, and Ahmet Ertegun, the chairman, died on 14 December.

In the 2010s, the American Turkish Society introduced several scholarship programs. These included the Ahmet Ertegun Memorial Scholarship and the Arif Mardin Fellowship. In collaboration with the School of Visual Arts, the society also established a scholarship that supports a Turkish artist each year to participate in SVA’s Summer Residency Program in New York.

In 2011, the American Turkish Society assumed management of the Moon and Stars Project (MASP) Grants, as well as the New York Turkish Film Festival.

In 2019, the society co-founded the Promising Turks Fund with the Turkish-American Association. The fund supports Turkish students in the United States in fields such as science, technology, engineering, arts, mathematics, and international relations.

== Board of directors ==
- Suzan Sabancı, Chairwoman of Akbank (Co-chair)
- Linda Wachner, Former president and CEO of Warnaco Group (Co-chair)
- Banu Basar, Turkey Country Executive of Bank of America (Vice Co-chair)
- Kerem Kamışlı, Board member of Esas Holding (Vice Co-chair)
- Metin Negrin, Founder and president of Lexin Capital (Vice Co-chair & Treasurer)
- Barbaros Karaahmet, Chief Operating Partner of Herrick, Feinstein LLP
- Orcun Dogancali, Former legal manager at beIN MEDIA GROUP (Secretary)
- Nevzat Aydın, Founder of Yemeksepeti
- Eren Bali, Founder of Udemy and Carbon Health
- Andrew L. Cohen, Executive Chairman of JP Morgan Global Private Bank
- Selin Gulcelik, Head of Gulcelik Family Funds
- Ahmet Okumus, CIO of RPD Fund Management
- Ertem Osmanoglu, Principal of Risk & Financial Advisory at Deloitte
- Pelin Akın Özalp, Board member of Akfen Holding
- Tamer Seckin, Founder of Endometriosis Foundation of America
- Saad Toma, General Manager of IBM Middle East and Africa
- Cem Topcuoglu, President of Omnicom CEE&AME
- Cenk Ulu, Senior Partner at PwC
- Zeynep Yenel, Turkey country director of Goldman Sachs
- Yesim Philip, Founder of L'Etoile Sport
- Farshid Asl, Partner at Goldman Sachs

== Programs and activities ==
=== Lectures, Panels, Gatherings ===
The American Turkish Society organizes seasonal gatherings, lectures, panels, and webinars on topics related to U.S.–Turkey relations, including culture, history, economics, and education.

=== Scholarships & Grants ===
The American Turkish Society offers scholarships, grants, and awards to students, educators, and artists in the United States and Turkey. These include the Ahmet Ertegun Memorial Scholarship at The Juilliard School, the Arif Mardin Music Fellowship at Berklee College of Music, and a summer residency scholarship at the School of Visual Arts.

The American Turkish Society manages the Moon and Stars Project (MASP) grants, which support artists and cultural initiatives related to Turkey. The grants are awarded competitively to both emerging and established artists to facilitate cultural exchange between the United States and Turkey.

=== New York Turkish Film Festival ===
The New York Turkish Film Festival was founded in 1999 by the Moon and Stars Project, a nonprofit organization focused on Turkish arts and culture. In 2009, the Moon and Stars Project began operating under the umbrella of the American Turkish Society. The festival features screenings of Turkish films as well as workshops and question-and-answer sessions with filmmakers, directors, and actors from Turkey.

=== Young Society Leaders ===
In 2011, the American Turkish Society launched the Young Society Leaders (YSL) program. The program recognizes young professionals in fields such as business, law, medicine, journalism, international affairs, academia, the arts, and design. The YSL program aims to create a community of peers, support emerging leaders, and address issues related to the American–Turkish community.

=== Next Generation Council ===
In 2021, the American Turkish Society established the Next Generation Council (NGC). The council engages younger members and those with less experience in society activities and prepares them for potential future leadership roles. It works with the board and executive committee and carries out responsibilities assigned by the board.

=== Annual Gala ===
The American Turkish Society began hosting its Annual Gala in 2006. The first event recognized the 50-year partnership between Ford Motor Company and Koç Holding. Subsequent galas have highlighted collaborations between companies such as Citi and Sabancı Holding, General Electric and Doğuş Group, and The Coca-Cola Company and Anadolu Group, as well as the listing of Turkcell on the New York Stock Exchange and the collaboration of Turner Broadcasting System and Doğan Media Group.

The gala has also recognized philanthropic and humanitarian contributions, including awards to Hüsnü Özyeğin and Hamdi Ulukaya. Other honorees have included the Endometriosis Foundation of America, Yemeksepeti, Dr. Oz, the Vehbi Koç Foundation, and Mica and Ahmet Ertegün.

== See also ==
- U.S.-Turkey Business Council
- Turkish Coalition of America
- Congressional Caucus on Turkey and Turkish Americans
- Turkey–United States relations
