= Ben Tristem =

British Educator (born 1976)

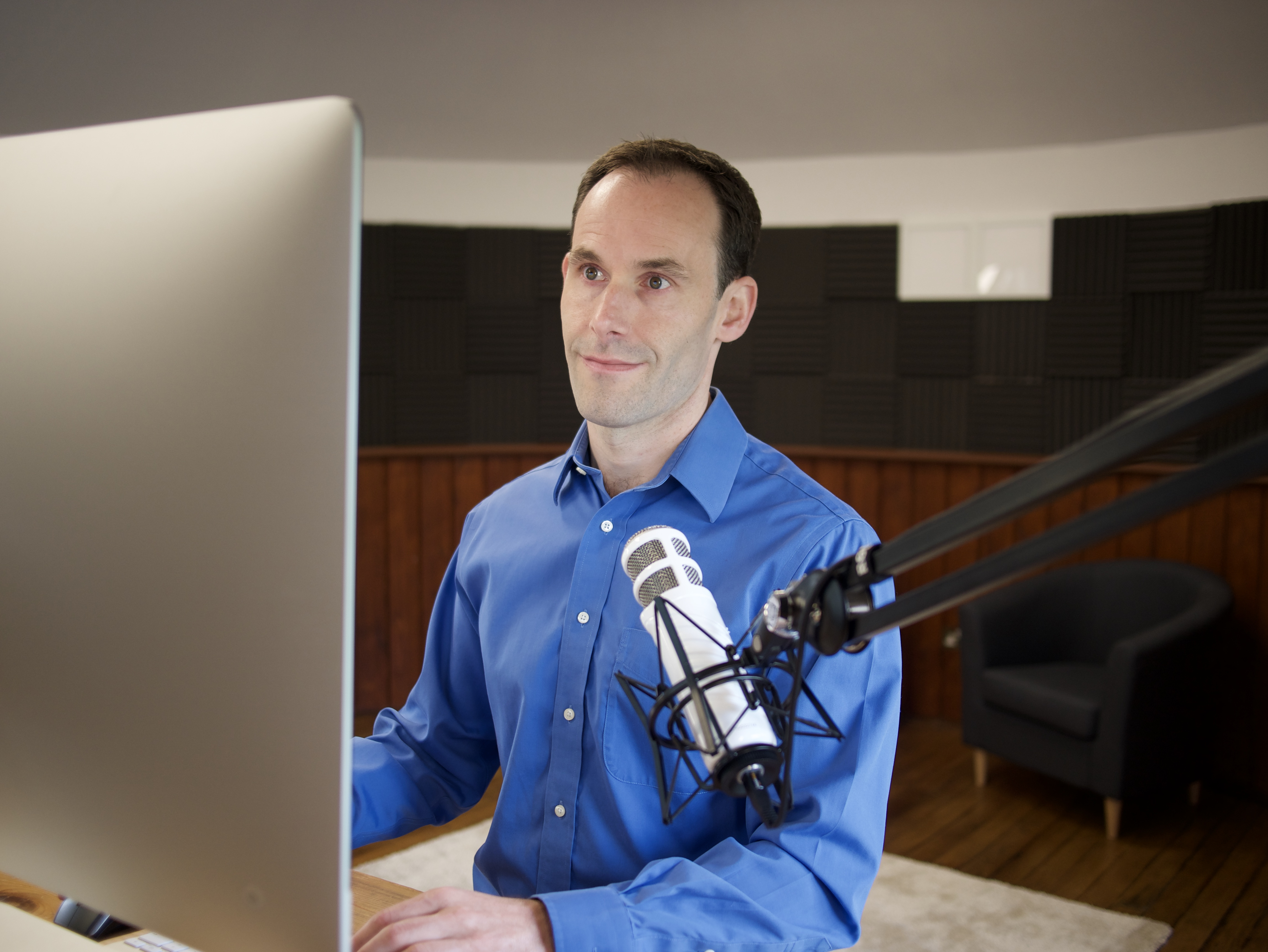
- Ben Tristem At Work
- Born: 30 August 1976 (age 50); London, UK
- Citizenship: British
- Education: Imperial College, London, Open University
- Occupations: Online educator, entrepreneur and author
- Website: gamedev.tv

Ben Tristem (born 30 August 1976) is an English online educator on Udemy, entrepreneur and author. Tristem has toured Britain in a motorhome, working online via Internet. The European Space Agency put him forward to Channel 4's 2004 Superhuman Program as a British candidate astronaut.

== Early life and education ==
Tristem was born in London, England. He was educated at Dulwich College. Tristem graduated from Imperial College in London, UK with an honors degree in computer science.

== Career ==
Tristem set up his first business at the age of 15, has flying experience and qualifications in gymnastics, sky diving, trampolining, martial arts, and rock climbing. He has a number of game development courses on Udemy. In 2016 he gave a TEDx talk on "Navigating your learning journey".
