= NextGen Jane =

Healthcare company

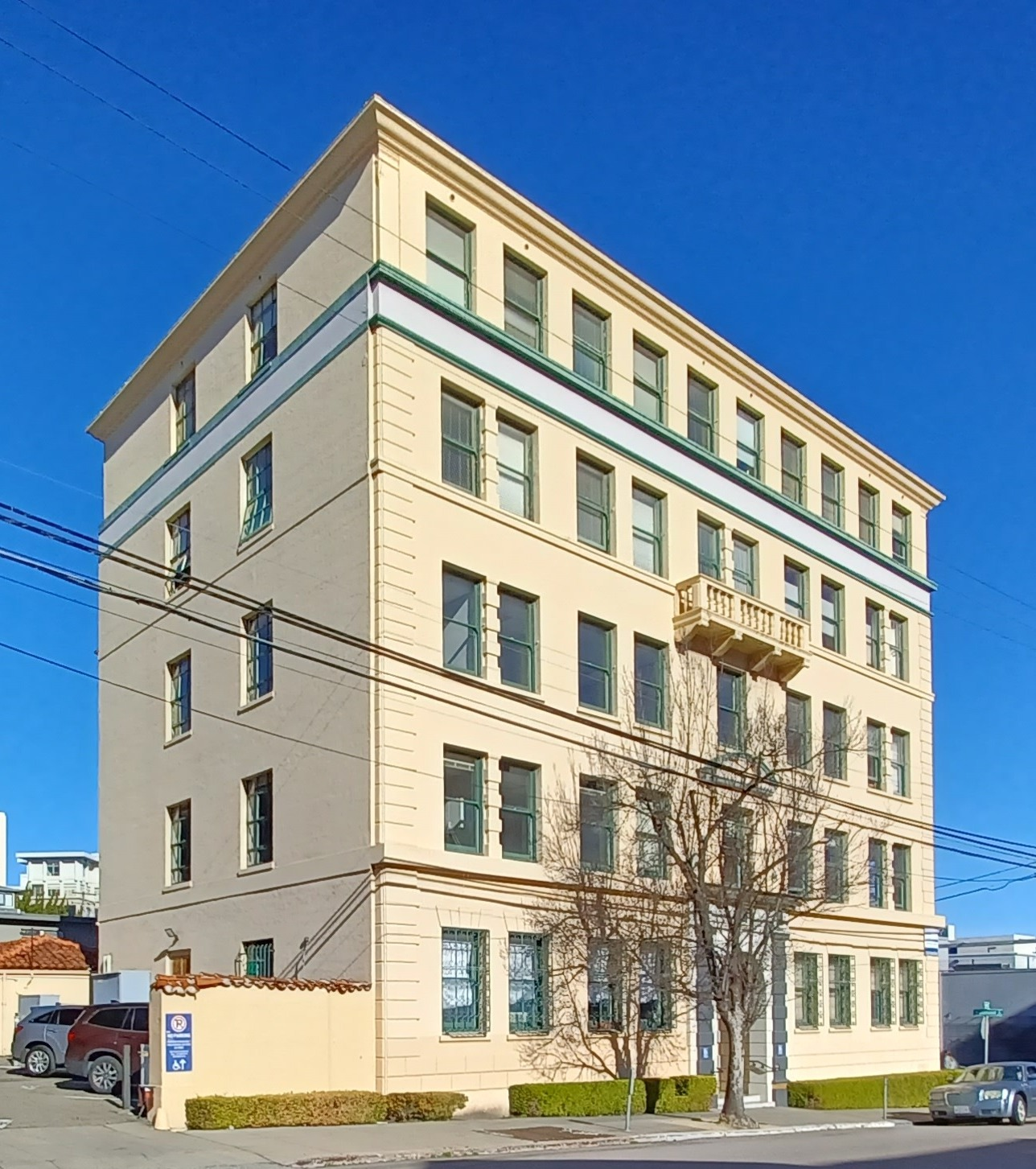
- NextGen Jane's headquarters at 400 29th St, Oakland, California, United States
- Industry: Biotechnology and Genomics
- Founded: 2014
- Headquarters: Oakland, California, United States
- Key people: Ridhi Tariyal (Co-founder), Stephen Gire, (Co-founder)
- Website: www.nextgenjane.com

NextGen Jane is a women's healthcare company founded in 2014 by Ridhi Tariyal and Stephen Gire, headquartered in Oakland, California, United States. The company is recognized for developing a Smart Tampon System to provide insights into a woman's reproductive health system.

== History ==
In 2013, Tariyal was part of the first class of the Blavatnik Fellowship at Harvard University. The purpose of the fellowship is to place recent MBA graduates in labs across Harvard with the goal of commercializing life science-based enterprises.

Following the completion of the fellowship, Tariyal and Gire founded the company to center around fertility and empowering women to manage their own reproductive health. They later developed intellectual property for a Smart Tampon System to gather genomic information about a woman's health.

In 2024, Tariyal received the Innovation Award from the Endometriosis Foundation of America.

== Products and services ==
The Smart Tampon System is a device that detects early markers of endometriosis in the menstrual blood, as well as track other biological changes in a woman's body. The conventional method of diagnosing endometriosis is by surgeons inserting a small camera into the pelvic cavity to look for endometrial cells in places other than the lining of the uterus. When these cells are detected, the diseased tissue can be removed. The method of analyzing the menstrual blood retained in the tampons aims to improve the diagnostic index of these diseases, as well as improve the discomfort and impracticality experienced by women with more conventional methods of diagnosis, enabling them to manage their healthcare more autonomously. The company also focuses on disease that impacts fertility in women, including endometriosis, uterine fibroids, and polycystic ovarian syndrome.
