= Arrest of teenage girls on terror charges in Istanbul =

Turkish police operation in May 2024

On 7 May 2024, in the early morning hours, a large-scale operation was carried out by the Anti-Terrorism Department units of the Istanbul Police Department in Beylikdüzü district against people associated with the Gülen group including young middle school and high school girls. Thirty-eight people were arrested during the operation and accused of gathering for study sessions and engaging in social activities like playing bowling, ordering food online. The case was referred to in the media as the Girls' Trial (Turkish: Kız Çocukları Davası) because it involved the prosecution of children between the ages of 13 and 17. During the detention, it was alleged that statements were recorded without a lawyer's presence and under psychological pressure. After a 4-day detention period, an arrest warrant was issued for 28 of them on May 10, 2024.

== Treatment of minors ==
During the same operation, 15 girls aged 13 to 17 were apprehended by police forces without their families’ consent and taken to the Üsküdar Children Police Department for “information gathering.” They were interrogated for 16 hours without their parents or lawyers present, and then released.

Two of the girls later stated that the police deprived them of food during the process and they were not allowed to communicate with each other.

== Indictment ==
On June 10, 2024, the Istanbul Attorney General's Office filed a 529-page indictment against 41 individuals, accusing them of being members of an armed terrorist organization. The indictment primarily alleged that:

- Female college students were residing in apartments allegedly tied to the terrorist organization.
- 13 parents were charged with "allowing" their children to live in these apartments.
- The students allegedly engaged in social and recreational activities, including playing bowling, mentoring younger students, and distributing food.
- The group used the popular food delivery app Yemeksepeti to order food.

The indictment was supported by evidence such as phone records, physical surveillance reports, and statements from the 13-17-year-old girls obtained during interrogations at the Children Police Station.

On July 8, 2024, the Istanbul 24th High Criminal Court accepted the indictment and scheduled the first hearing for September 23–27, 2024. The court ordered the 13–17 years old girls to appear at the hearing as witnesses. The first hearing of the trial began on September 23, 2024, and lasted five days. DEM Party MP Ömer Faruk Gergerlioğlu , who was observing the trial, was removed from the courtroom on the second day due to his social media criticisms. He claimed that the presiding judge had lost impartiality and filed complaints against the judge.

== Reaction ==
Human Rights Association (Turkey) Co-chair Lawyer Eren Keskin emphasized that the police methods applied to these girls were illegal. Gergerlioğlu questioned Interior Minister Ali Yerlikaya about the law enforcement actions, deeming them illegal. Ali Yerlikaya responded that the children and their families were informed by a social worker and psychologist on duty, and the children were sent with their families immediately after legal procedures were completed. He added that "the statement of the person named N.Z.B. in question was about gathering information, she was not interrogated as a suspect".

In September 2024, the Italian Federation for Human Rights called the case "an embodiment of the critical failings in Türkiye's judicial system, ranging from bias on the part of prosecutors to procedural violations which undermine the right to a fair trial." They recommended that human rights organizations continue to observe the case and that Turkey reform its Anti-Terrorism legislation.

European Parliament Rapporteur for Turkey, Nacho Sanchez, in a speech he gave at the 81st EU-Turkey Joint Parliamentary Committee on November 27, 2024, and which he broadcast on his YouTube channel, stated that there has been no progress in Turkey regarding the judiciary and fundamental rights. Addressing Turkish officials and politicians, Amor made a scathing criticism, saying, "You have reached such a low level in democratic standards that it is impossible to make it worse." Amor strongly condemned the case, saying, "You are trying 14-year-old girls for terrorism. In the courts, your judges ask the girl why she went to study with her neighbor and consider this a terrorist activity".
