= Yemeksepeti =

Turkish online food delivery company

Yemeksepeti.com
- Industry: e-commerce
- Founded: 2001
- Founder: Nevzat Aydın, Melih Ödemiş, Cem Nufusi, Gökhan Akan
- Area served: Turkey, Northern Cyprus
- Key people: Mert Baki (CEO)
- Products: Online food delivery
- Owner: Delivery Hero
- Website: yemeksepeti.com

Yemeksepeti (lit. 'food basket') is a Turkish online food delivery company. It currently operates in 70 cities in Turkey and in Northern Cyprus, with more than 35,000 member restaurants, 18 million users, and 520,000 daily orders.

Its restaurant network includes global and domestic brands like Burger King, Domino's Pizza, McDonald's, Saloon Burger, Komagene Etsiz Çiğ Köfte, KFC, Popeyes, PizzaLazza, Little Caesars Pizza, Pizza Bulls, Papa John's Pizza, Subway, Pizza Lazza, Pizza Hut, Terra Pizza - Pizza Pizza, Oses Çiğ Köfte, Etiler Marmaris, Hot Döner, Öncü Döner, Pasaport Pizza, Saray Muhallebicisi 1935 and Pizza Locale.

Yemeksepeti takes orders via iPhone, Android, mobile web, and website.

Yemeksepeti also has Yemeksepeti Vale service, which allows ordering from restaurants that do not normally do takeaway. With Yemeksepeti providing its own courier service, restaurants do not have to invest in a business other than their own expertise.

== History ==
Logo until September 2021

Yemeksepeti.com was founded in the year 2001 by Nevzat Aydin, Melih Odemis, Cem Nufusi and Gokhan Akan, and reached 1,000 daily orders for the first time in 2004. This number increased to 10,000 in 2008. In the same year, the company had its first round of investment and agreed to be partners with European Founders Fund.

Yemeksepeti entered the GCC region by launching out Foodonclick.com in the United Arab Emirates in 2010, starting in Dubai and expanding to Abu Dhabi and Sharjah in the same year. In the same year the company had its first expansion to foreign countries, with the izrestorana.co name in Russia. In 2013 the company expanded to Qatar, Saudi Arabia, Oman and Lebanon with the Foodonclick.com name. In the same year Yemeksepeti expanded to Southeast Europe (Greece). Before the acquisition by Delivery Hero in 2015, Yemeksepeti was active in ten countries including the UAE, Saudi Arabia, Lebanon, Oman, Qatar, Jordan, Greece, Bulgaria and Romania.

In 2012, Yemeksepeti announced a US$44 million investment led by global growth investor General Atlantic (GA), which acquired a minority stake in the company. Yemeksepeti represented GA's first investment in Turkey. Yemeksepeti increased the daily number of orders to 50,000 the same year.

In May 2015, Yemeksepeti was acquired by the German-based Delivery Hero. It is the biggest internet acquisition of the Region.

As of 2020, Yemeksepeti gained 5 million new members and the number of members exceeded 20 million. Nevzat Aydın, one of the founders of Yemeksepeti, handed over the CEO position of the company to Mert Baki on November 1, 2021.

Yemeksepeti currently serves in 81 provinces of Turkey.

== Subsidiaries ==
Yellow: Cities where only Yemeksepeti is available. Purple: Cities where Yemeksepeti and Yemeksepeti Market is available

=== Yemeksepeti Market ===
In April 2019, Yemeksepeti launched the online market shopping service with the Yemeksepeti Market sub-brand. Yemeksepeti Market operates in 30 cities and delivers over 4.000 products to users in about 15 minutes. In 2020 Webrazzi Awards Yemeksepeti Market came second for the Online Market Ordering, and came 3rd in the Enterprise of the Year Category.

=== Yemek.com ===
In September 2014, yemek.com was established under the infrastructure of Yemeksepeti in order to bring together the tricks of dishes, places and food trends. Companies like Pepsi, Filiz, Sütaş promote their products with their own recipes on the website.

== Controversies ==
=== Data breach ===
On 27 March 2021 the company made a formal statement about user data getting stolen. The explanation told that the data breach happened on 25 March and when it was noticed some part the user data (phone numbers, e-mails, and addresses). In the continuation of the statement, it was said that the problem that caused the breach was fixed.

=== Protest of poor working conditions ===
From January 2022 to February 2022, delivery workers of Yemeksepeti carried out protests and strikes demanding better wage hikes. The workers demand a net monthly salary 5,500TL, premiums and fringe benefits.

Also, they want their line of business to be registered as "transport," their union activities to be guaranteed and no workers to lose their jobs because of seeking their rights.
