= Nevzat Aydın =

Turkish entrepreneur

- Born: 8 March 1976 (age 50)
- Education: Boğaziçi University
- Occupations: Internet entrepreneur, businessperson, angel investor, mentor

Nevzat Aydın (born 8 March 1976) is a Turkish internet entrepreneur, angel investor and a mentor. Aydın is the co-founder and former CEO of Yemeksepeti, the leading online food delivery portal in Turkey.

During his lead in 2015, Yemeksepeti was acquired by the German-based Delivery Hero for $589 million (£378 m), which was the biggest valuation ever yet in Turkish internet history. He was among the 150 entrepreneurs invited from all around the world to the Entrepreneurship Summit held by USA President Barack Obama in April 2010. Aydın also was one of the juries/investors in Dragon's Den TV show. In 2013 and 2015, Aydın was named number one on Fortune's 40 Under 40 List.

== Yemeksepeti career ==
Professional career of Nevzat Aydın started with Yemeksepeti the first online food ordering company in Turkey, providing the facility to place food orders on-line from an affiliated network of restaurants without charging the user any extra fees. Aydın founded the company with Melih Odemis (chief technology officer), Cem Nufusi (sales director) and Gokhan Akan (chief financial officer), and has been the chief executive officer of the company since then.

When Aydın and the team started the business in 2001, internet penetration was very low in Turkey. Yemeksepeti did not make any profit for the first 5 years, but with a strong focus on customer experience and the convenience of the business model, they managed to convince the users and the restaurants to benefit from the huge potential of internet.

In accordance with the vision of Aydın, Yemeksepeti has continuously integrated most recent technologies and adopted global standards for customer experience. The company started to invest in mobile infrastructures in 2010 and activated Online Credit Card feature in 2013.

On 1 November 2021, Nevzat Aydın resigned from Yemeksepeti.

== Investments received by Yemeksepeti ==
Yemeksepeti had its first round of investment and agreed to be partners with European Founders Fund, in 2008. In 2012, Yemeksepeti announced a $44 million investment led by global growth investor General Atlantic (GA), which acquired a minority stake in the company, and represented GA's first investment in Turkey.

== Foreign operations ==
Yemeksepeti entered the GCC region by launching out Foodonclick.com in The United Arab Emirates in 2009, starting in Dubai then extending to Abu Dhabi and Sharjah in the same year. Before the acquisition by Delivery Hero in 2015, Yemeksepeti was active in 10 countries including United Arab Emirates, Saudi Arabia, Lebanon, Oman, Qatar, Jordan, Greece, Bulgaria and Romania.

== Exit and profit share ==
In May 2015 Yemeksepeti was sold to the German-based Delivery Hero for $589 million (£378 m). It was yet the biggest internet acquisition of the Region. Founder Aydin paid out $27 million to 114 workers as a profit-sharing bonus. The bonus decision received international coverage by prominent news channels such as Time, CNN, Independent, with the Aydın's quotation of, "Yemeksepeti's success story did not happen overnight. I believe in team work and I believe success is much more enjoyable and glorious when shared with the rest of the team".

== Investing ==
Aydın invested in 40 start-ups and the total amount of his investments reached $20 million. His area of focus includes internet services, mobile and online marketplaces. Nevertheless, he invests in various sectors and business models, which uses technology as a triggering factor.

== Public intellectual work ==
- Board member of Endeavor Turkey
- Board member TOBB (Union of Chambers and Commodity Exchanges of Turkey) Young Entrepreneurs
- Member of TUSİAD (Turkish Industrialists' and Businessmen's Association)
- Founding member of Galata Business Angels
- Board member and vice president Trabzonspor Football Club.
- Trustees Board Member of Boğaziçi University

== Personal life ==
He married Melis Pekand in 2011 and the couple divorced in 2017. He married glamour model Zeynep Zenel in 2022. He is a fan of the sports club Trabzonspor and has previously sat on its board.

== Honors and awards ==
- In 2001–2002 Interpro awarded Aydın with Entrepreneurship Award in IT
- In 2005, he represented Turkey in World Summit Award, organized by UNESCO with the support of UN
- In 2005, Ekonomist Magazine and Finans Leasing awarded Aydın with Jury's Special Award in Turkey's Hidden Champions
- In 2007, he was awarded as 'Endeavor Entrepreneur' by Endeavor Turkey
- In 2011, Ekonomist Magazine awarded him as the 'Entrepreneur of the Year'
- In 2011, he was honored as one of the speakers in Meet the Dragons event, organized by HOPE (Holland Program on Entrepreneurship) in Holland
- In 2012, Turkey's biggest internet, social media and digital marketing platform Webrazzi named him Entrepreneur of the Year
- In 2012, he was amongst the globally recognized speakers of DLD (Digital–Life–Design) Conference, held in Munich, Germany
- In 2012, he was the only Turkish speaker amongst the globally recognized speakers of 'MILKEN INSTITUTE Global Conference, held in Los Angeles
- In 2013, The Next Web awarded Aydın as the Best Founding Partner in TNW Turkish Startup Awards
- In 2013, Webrazzi named him Entrepreneur of the Year and Angel Investor of the Year
- In 2013, he was elected as the President of Avea Entrepreneurship Club
- In 2013 and 2014, he was a keynote speaker in NOAH Conference
- In 2013, he held the first place in Fortune Magazine's 40 Under 40 List
- In 2014, Yemeksepeti was honoured as one of the "Top 100 Superbrands in Turkey"
- In 2014, Webrazzi awarded him Entrepreneur of the Year for the third time
- In 2014, he was named as The Most Inspiring Entrepreneur in Doer Awards, organized by Lenovo
- In 2015, he was once more named number one on Fortune's 40 Under 40 List
- In 2016, he was selected as the Angel Investor of the Year by Webrazzi
- In 2017, he was selected as the "Best Businessman" by Galatasaray University
- In 2017, he was honored with the Philanthropy Award by American Turkish Society
