= Love, Loss, and What We Ate =

2016 memoir by Padma Lakshmi

- Lakshmi doing a book talk in New Delhi (2017)
- Author: Padma Lakshmi
- Language: English
- Genre: Food memoir
- Published: 2016
- Publisher: ECCO
- ISBN: 9780062202611
- OCLC: 911191142
- Dewey Decimal: 791.4502
- LC Class: PN1992.4.L29 A3 2016

Love, Loss, and What We Ate is a 2016 memoir by American television host Padma Lakshmi. Originally intended as a "book about healthy eating", it became a candid examination of abandonment by her father, childhood sexual abuse, her youth in Chennai, harassment she suffered as a young immigrant to the United States, the motor-vehicle collision she survived at age 14 that left her scarred, her years-long battle with endometriosis, her marriage to writer Salman Rushdie, and the pregnancy that yielded her daughter. The title nods to a 1995 memoir by Ilene Beckerman, Love, Loss and What I Wore, which Lakshmi's friend Nora Ephron had later adapted into a stage play. Lakshmi had previously written two cookbooks, Easy Exotic and Tangy Tart Hot and Sweet.

== Reception ==
Glamour magazine recommended it as a "memoir-cookbook places you at Lakshmi's table with her brave mother and brilliant grandfather, and you feel nourished in every way." Newsweek Global commented that the recipes include the "chili cheese toast of her childhood, the kumquat chutney she made in bulk after her marriage to Rushdie disintegrated, the egg-in-a-hole she ate just before going into labor. It's inconsistent as a cookbook, but the dishes should be read more as a refrain for the memoir's theme: It's not lost on Lakshmi that she has food to thank for her success." Food & Wine recommended it as an "object of obsession" in a 2016 issue.

== Critical analysis ==
Lakshmi's book has been described as using "foodwork...as a form of 'consumable heritage' that can imbue the diasporic food writer with visibility and agency...Lakshmi's writing also contextualizes cooking as a means of fortifying cultural and familial bonds and of constructing her identity rather than associating it with feminine passivity and subordination."
