= Eren Bali =

Turkish engineer and technology entrepreneur of Kurdish origin. (Born 1984)

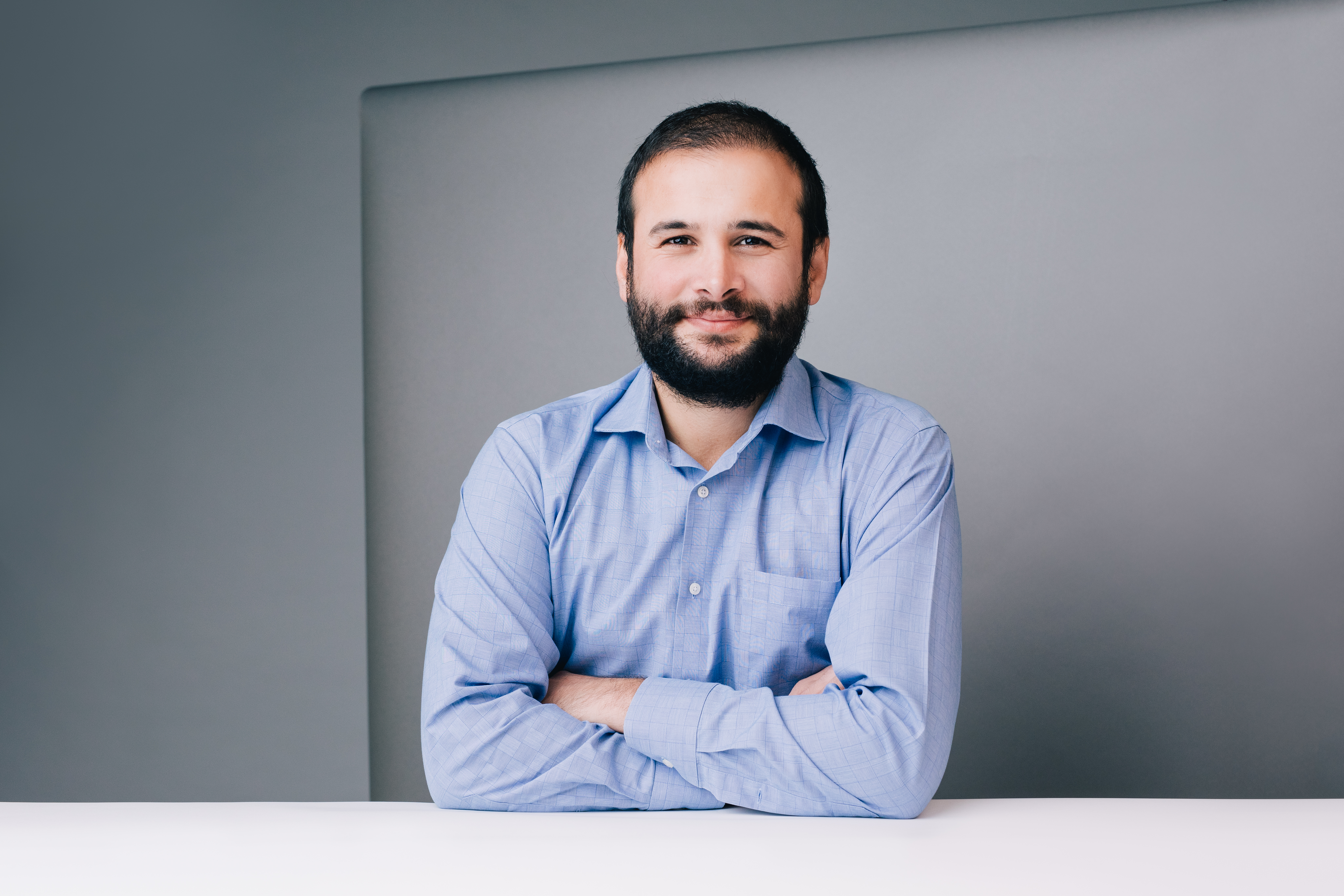
- Born: 1984 (age 41–42)
- Education: Middle East Technical University
- Occupations: Engineer, entrepreneur
- Known for: Udemy, Carbon Health
- Awards: International Mathematical Olympiad silver medal (2001); Forbes 30 Under 30 (2014)

Eren Bali (born 1984, Malatya, Turkey) is a Turkish engineer and technology entrepreneur of Kurdish origin based in the United States. He co-founded Udemy, an online learning platform, and Carbon Health, a healthcare technology company, and is the co-founder and CEO of Monogram, an artificial intelligence company.

== Early life and education ==
Eren Bali was born in 1984 to Kurdish parents in a mostly Kurdish populated Durulova, an apricot farming village in Malatya in Turkey. His mother was a teacher who taught the first through fifth grades in a one-room schoolhouse. His father was also a teacher but he was banned from teaching after the 1980 coup because of his activism.

In 2001, Bali won a silver medal in the International Mathematical Olympiad. The same year, he began his studies at Middle East Technical University, graduating in 2005 with a double major in computer engineering and mathematics.

== Career ==
In 2008 in Turkey, Bali launched a livestream-based learning platform called KnowBand, which didn’t take off; shortly afterward, however, a Silicon Valley–based online dating company called SpeedDate recruited Bali as an engineer.

In 2010, Bali co-founded Udemy with Oktay Caglar and Gagan Biyani. With initial investments from Russ Fradin and Keith Rabois, they raised one million dollars in seed financing. Between 2010 and 2014, the company grew to 4 million students and 15,000 teachers. In 2014, Bali stepped down as CEO and became the chairman. The same year, he was named on Forbes’ 30 Under 30 list.

Shortly afterward, Bali developed an interest in the healthcare industry when his mother became ill, and he spent some months accompanying her to doctors to get the right diagnosis and treatment. Bali first sought to support healthcare startups as an investor before ultimately deciding to start his own.

In 2015, Bali founded Carbon Health with Tom Berry. In 2016, the founding team expanded to include Pablo Stanley and Greg Burell, MD. In 2018, Carbon Health merged with Direct Urgent Care and added the owner, Caesar Djavaherian as a co-founder.

In August 2024, Bali stepped down as CEO of Carbon Health to return to Udemy as Chief Technology Officer, while remaining executive chairman at Carbon Health; Chief Operating Officer Kerem Ozkay was appointed as his successor.

In 2025, Bali co-founded Monogram, an artificial intelligence company, with Edouard Tabet and Murat Akbal. The company develops an AI interface that generates visual, interactive responses to user queries rather than conventional text-based chat responses. Bali serves as the company's chief executive officer. In July 2026, Monogram announced a $40 million seed funding round co-led by DST Global and Lux Capital.
