= Tamer Seckin =

American surgeon

- Occupation: Physician
- Known for: Co-founded the Endometriosis Foundation of America
- Website: www.drseckin.com

Tamer Ahmet Seckin (/ˈsɛtʃkiːn/) is a New York City-based gynecologist, laparoscopic surgeon, and specialist in endometriosis. He founded the Endometriosis Foundation of America (EndoFound) with Padma Lakshmi in 2009.

== Early life and education ==
Seckin was born in 1954 in Ankara, Turkey received his medical degree from Hacettepe University School of Medicine in 1978. He completed his gynecological residency training in 1985 at the Children's Hospital of State University of New York at Buffalo.

== Career ==
Seckin was the chief of gynecology at Kingsbrook Jewish Medical Center. He is an associate attending physician and clinical instructor at Lenox Hill Hospital and also has a private practice in New York City.

Seckin is a member of the American Medical Association, the American College of Obstetrics & Gynecology, the European Society of Reproductive Endocrinology, the Society of Laparoendoscopic Surgeons, the American Association of Gynecologic Laparoscopists, the American Fertility Society, the American Society for Reproductive Medicine, the Society of Reproductive Surgeons, the New York Gynecological Society, and the Society of Reproductive Endocrinology and Infertility. He was also the executive committee member of the International Society of Gynecological Endoscopy.

In 2012, Seckin received the United States Ellis Island Medal of Honor. He is a member of the Board of Directors of the American Turkish Society.

== Endometriosis Foundation of America ==
In 2006, Seckin co-founded the Endometriosis Foundation of America with patients including Padma Lakshmi. EndoFound was established to correct misdiagnoses and raise public awareness through programs in New York City high schools that educate school nurses, students, and teachers about endometriosis. Starting in 2009, Seckin organized yearly conferences on advancing the science and surgery of endometriosis. Through EndoFound, Seckin co-founded the ROSE (Research Outsmarts Endometriosis) Project at the New York-based Feinstein Institute for Medical Research.

== Selected bibliography ==
Books

- Seckin T (2016). The Doctor Will See You Now: Recognizing and Treating Endometriosis. Turner Publishing. ISBN 978-1681621128.

Journal publications

- Ayhan A, Mao TL, Seckin T, Wu CH, Guan B, Ogawa H, Futagami M, Mizukami H, Yokoyama Y, Kurman RJ, Shih IM (October 2012). "Loss of ARID1A expression is an early molecular event in tumor progression from ovarian endometriotic cyst to clear cell and endometrioid carcinoma". Int. J. Gynecol. Cancer. 22 (8): 1310–5. doi:10.1097/IGC.0b013e31826b5dcc. PMC 3460070. PMID 22976498.
- Anglesio MS, Papadopoulos N, Ayhan A, Nazeran TM, Noë M, Horlings HM, Lum A, Jones S, Senz J, Seckin T, Ho J, Wu RC, Lac V, Ogawa H, Tessier-Cloutier B, Alhassan R, Wang A, Wang Y, Cohen JD, Wong F, Hasanovic A, Orr N, Zhang M, Popoli M, McMahon W, Wood LD, Mattox A, Allaire C, Segars J, Williams C, Tomasetti C, Boyd N, Kinzler KW, Gilks CB, Diaz L, Wang TL, Vogelstein B, Yong PJ, Huntsman DG, Shih IM (May 2017). "Cancer-Associated Mutations in Endometriosis without Cancer". N. Engl. J. Med. 376 (19): 1835–1848. doi:10.1056/NEJMoa1614814. PMC 5555376. PMID 28489996.
