= Carbon Health =

American healthcare company

Carbon Health Inc.
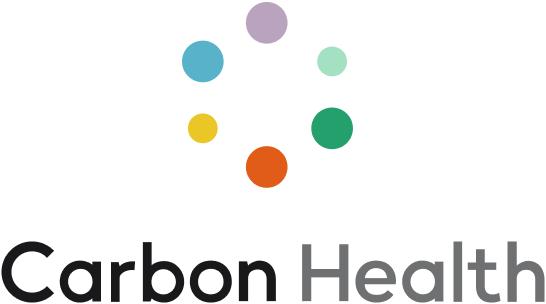
- Industry: Primary healthcare, urgent care
- Founded: 2015; 11 years ago
- Founders: Eren Bali; Tom Berry; Greg Burell; Caesar Djavaherian
- Headquarters: San Francisco, California, United States
- Number of locations: 101 (2022)
- Total equity: US$3.3 billion (2021)
- Number of employees: 2,309 (2021)
- Website: carbonhealth.com

Carbon Health is an American chain of primary healthcare and urgent care clinics founded in 2015 in San Francisco that also provides telemedicine. The company filed for Chapter 11 bankruptcy protection in February 2026 with plans to eliminate its arranged $100 million to $500 million debt, and emerged from bankruptcy in May 2026.

Carbon Health positions itself as a technology-first provider aiming to meet patients across virtual, in-person, and at-home settings, streamlining doctor-patient workflows and administrative processes.

== History ==
Carbon Health was founded in San Francisco in 2015 by Udemy co-founder Eren Bali, engineer Tom Berry, and physician Greg Burell. It began as a software platform and mobile app for medical records, telehealth, doctor-patient messaging, and scheduling. The team developed the platform by opening a private clinic that saw about 750 patients; at the time, their goal was to build software for medical practices.

In 2017, Eren Bali was introduced to Dr. Caesar Djavaherian, an Iranian-American emergency medicine doctor and owner of Direct Urgent Care, a national chain of urgent care clinics. Djavaherian had experienced problems with electronic health record (EHR) systems, and he decided to pilot the Carbon Health software in his clinics. In 2018, Carbon Health and Direct Urgent Care merged, and Caesar Djavaherian became the company's fourth co-founder. Because of this merge, Carbon Health now owned 7 brick-and-mortar clinics in the San Francisco Bay Area.

In 2017, Carbon Health created a mobile app to communicate directly with doctors, and an alternative to traditional EHR systems.

In 2019, Carbon Health announced a Series B round of $30 million, followed by a Series B extension of $28M in early 2020 to strengthen its initiatives related to the COVID-19 pandemic. Later in 2020, the company announced a $100M round led by Dragoneer Investment Group, and in 2021, a $350M round led by The Blackstone Group.

By April 2021, Carbon Health had 49 physical location medical clinics, including 19 clinics in the San Francisco Bay Area and 8 clinics in Los Angeles. By October 2021, Carbon Health had 90 full service medical clinics, located in 14 states within the United States.

In 2023, Carbon Health partnered with CVS Health to pilot a new clinic model offering primary and urgent care services within CVS retail stores. The partnership was part of a broader $100 million investment led by CVS Health's corporate venture arm.

In August 2024, Carbon Health co-founder and CEO Eren Bali stepped down from his role to return to Udemy, the education company he co-founded, as Chief Technology Officer. Bali announced the move on social media, noting that Udemy held a "special place" in his heart. He will remain involved with Carbon Health as executive chairman. Chief Operating Officer Kerem Ozkay was named the new CEO.

=== Bankruptcy and sale ===
In February 2026, Carbon Health filed for Chapter 11 bankruptcy protection with plans to eliminate its arranged $100 million to $500 million debt. Carbon Health claimed that it reached an agreement with lenders to recapitalize its business and transfer operations to new ownership. As part of this plan, the company confirmed a court-supervised Chapter 11 plan that focuses on debt equity exchange that would allow for the sale of its assets, as well as receiving over $19.5 million in debtor in possession financing.

The plan was approved by a bankruptcy judge on May 29, 2026, which allowed the company to transfer ownership to lenders, receive $33 million in new capital financing, and continue operations through over $100 million in a debt-for-equity exchange that would transfer its assets to Future Solution Investments, LLC. The new owners plan to invest millions in artificial intelligence that would go towards the company. Carbon Health emerged from Chapter 11 bankruptcy that same day.

== COVID-19 ==
In March 2020, Carbon Health partnered with the San Francisco-based online pharmacy Alto Pharmacy to provide oral swab home test kits to patients in California. The tests were not authorized by the United States Food and Drug Administration (FDA) but claimed to be authorized for distribution under an Emergency Use Authorization; That same week, the FDA suspended the sales and distribution of home testing kits produced by Carbon Health, among others.

In April 2020, Carbon Health released an open source, HIPAA-compliant repository of COVID-19 clinical data.
