= Linda J. Wachner =

American businesswoman (born 1946)

Linda Joy Wachner
- Born: February 3, 1946 (age 80); New York City
- Education: B.A. University of Buffalo
- Occupation: Businesswoman
- Known for: CEO of Warnaco
- Spouse: Seymour Appelbaum
- Parent(s): Shirley and Herman Wachner

Linda Joy Wachner (born February 3, 1946) is an American businesswoman. She was President and CEO of Warnaco Group Inc. from 1986 to 2001. She began her career as a buyer for department stores including Foley's and Macy's.

== Biography ==
Born to a Jewish family in New York City and raised in Queens, the daughter of Shirley and Herman Wachner. Her father was a fur salesman and her mother worked as a sales associate at Saks Fifth Avenue. In 1966, Wachner graduated with a B.A. in business administration from the University of Buffalo. After school, she held a succession of jobs first working for the Associated Merchandising Corporation, the New York City buying arm of Federated Department Stores; then as an assistant buyer at Foley's department store in Houston; and then as the bra and girdle buyer at Macy's in New York City. In 1974, she then took a marketing job at Warnaco and soon became a vice president, the company's first. In 1978, she went to work for Norton Simon tasked with turning around the money-losing U.S. division of Max Factor. In her second year, the division reported a $5 million profit. Max Factor was purchased by Esmark in 1983 and then after being purchased by Beatrice Foods in 1984, Wachner raised $280 million and tried to buy the company; Beatrice rejected her offer.

In 1986, hearing that Warnaco's CEO, Robert Matura, wanted to take the company private, she partnered with Los Angeles investor Andrew Galef and offered $36 a share for the company. Although a bidding war broke out with competing bidder Matura, Wachner and Galef ultimately won the bid paying $46.50 a share or $550 million of which $500 million was borrowed via Drexel Burnham Lambert. Wachner effectively took control of the company becoming at the time the only female CEO of a Fortune 500 industrial company. In October 1991, Warnaco went public. She shrunk the business, selling off money losing lines to focus on two divisions: intimate apparel and menswear.

During this time Warnaco had licensing agreements in menswear with Speedo, Calvin Klein, Christian Dior, Hathaway, Chaps by Ralph Lauren, and Jack Nicklaus; and in intimate apparel with Valentino, Ungaro, Scaasi, Bob Mackie, Fruit of the Loom, and Victoria's Secret. In 1990 Wachner sold 95% of its activewear division which included Speedo bathing suits for $85 million to a management group led by Wachner and several other Warnaco executives. In 1992, the company, renamed Authentic Fitness, went public. In 1999, Warnaco reacquired Authentic Fitness for $504 million (~$890 million in 2024) ($414 million in cash and $120 million in the assumption of debt).

In 2000, Calvin Klein, Inc. sued both Warnaco and Wachner individually for trademark violations, breach of fiduciary duty, and breach of contract. The lawsuit stemmed from Warnaco's selling Calvin Klein branded jeans and underwear to warehouse clubs such as Costco and BJ's Wholesale Club, which Klein contended devalued his brand name. Warnaco responded by saying that Klein had known of the sales to warehouse clubs all along and that he had failed to participate in meetings about the design of Warnaco's Calvin Klein clothing. The lawsuit was settled in 2001. Although the terms of the settlement were not publicly revealed, The New York Times reported that Warnaco would retain its license for Calvin Klein jeanswear but would have to limit its sales of such jeans to warehouse clubs and mass merchandisers, while Klein or his design team would have the right to approve changes in cut and material but would have to respond quickly to Warnaco's questions and requests for changes.

Warnaco filed for bankruptcy protection on June 11, 2001. In November of that year, Wachner left her position as chief executive of Warnaco, but continued to provide transition assistance during the company's bankruptcy. Wachner's contract (which would otherwise have entitled her to a payment of $43.6 million on termination) had been voided as a result of the bankruptcy.

== Other ==
In 1993, Fortune magazine listed Wachner among the seven "roughest, toughest, most intimidating bosses". Also on the list were T. J. Rodgers of Cypress Semiconductor, Steve Jobs of Next Computer, Herbert Haft of Dart Group, and Harvey and Bob Weinstein of Miramax. In 1996, Wachner was reported to be the highest-paid female corporate executive in the United States.

Wachner served on the Board of Trustees at Carnegie Hall from 2015 to at least 2019.

== Personal life ==
In 1973, she married Seymour Appelbaum who was 31 years her senior; he died in 1983. They did not have any children.
