= Padma Lakshmi =

American TV host and model (born 1970)

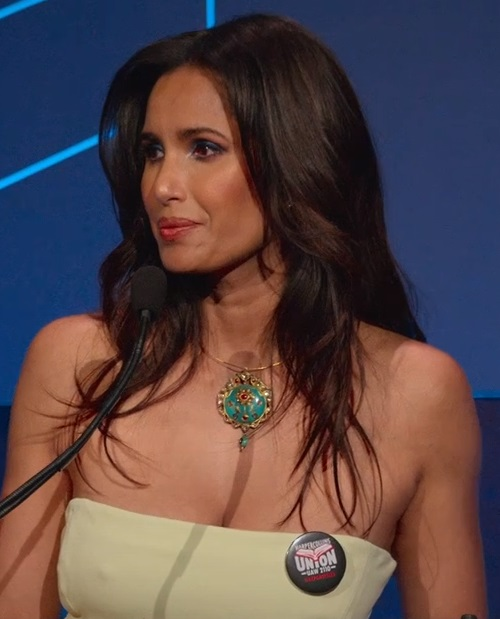
- Lakshmi in 2022
- Born: Padma Parvati Lakshmi Vaidynathan; September 1, 1970 (age 56); Madras, Tamil Nadu, India
- Citizenship: United States
- Education: Clark University (BA)
- Occupations: TV host; model; author; entrepreneur; activist; producer
- Years active: 1992–present
- Spouse: Salman Rushdie (m. 2004; div. 2007)
- Children: 1
- Modeling information
- Height: 5 ft 9 in (1.75 m)
- Hair color: Black
- Eye color: Brown
- Website: www.padmalakshmi.com

Padma Parvati Lakshmi (Tamil pronunciation: [ˈpɐd̪maː ˈlɐkʂmi]; née Vaidynathan; born September 1, 1970) is an American television host, model, author, entrepreneur, and activist. She rose to prominence by hosting the Bravo cooking competition program Top Chef (2006–2023). Lakshmi is the creator, host, and executive producer of the docuseries Taste the Nation with Padma Lakshmi, which premiered in 2020 on Hulu. For her work with these two series, as an executive producer and as a host, she has received 16 Primetime Emmy Award nominations.

Born in India, Lakshmi immigrated to the United States as a child. She became a model before embarking on a career on television. She has written five books: two cookbooks, Easy Exotic and Tangy, Tart, Hot & Sweet; an encyclopedia, The Encyclopedia of Spices & Herbs: An Essential Guide to the Flavors of the World; a memoir, Love, Loss, and What We Ate; and a children's book, Tomatoes for Neela illustrated by Juana Martinez-Neal, the latter two appearing on The New York Times's best-seller list. Lakshmi has formed and produced sales for five different businesses. She co-founded the Endometriosis Foundation of America in 2009. She was appointed United Nations Development Programme Goodwill Ambassador in 2019. Lakshmi was listed among Time magazine's 100 most influential people in the world in 2023.

== Early life ==
Lakshmi was born Padma Parvati Lakshmi Vaidynathan on September 1, 1970, in Madras (now known as Chennai), Tamil Nadu, India. Her mother, Vijaya Lakshmi, is a retired oncology nurse. Vijaya and Lakshmi's father separated in 1971 and divorced the next year, after which the former immigrated to the United States alone. Lakshmi lived with her maternal grandparents before joining Vijaya two years later. She lived in Queens, New York City, before moving to La Puente, California, with her stepfather, Anand Prasad – a Fijian-born ethnic Indian – and Vijaya. Lakshmi has stated that, as a teenager, she was bullied due to her Indian heritage, which caused her to struggle to overcome "internalized self-loathing".

At the age of 14, Lakshmi was hospitalized for three weeks and was eventually diagnosed with Stevens–Johnson syndrome. Two days after her discharge from the hospital, she was injured in a car accident in Malibu, California, which left her with a fractured right hip and a shattered right upper arm. The arm injury required surgery, from which she retained a seven-inch scar between her elbow and shoulder.

Lakshmi graduated from William Workman High School in 1988. In 1992, she graduated from Clark University, earning a bachelor's degree in theatre arts and American literature.

In a 2018 essay for The New York Times, Lakshmi revealed that, at the age of 16, she was raped by her then boyfriend, which she did not report; Lakshmi stated that she made the decision because, at the age of seven, she was molested by her step-uncle, and Vijaya and Anand sent her back to India for a year after she told them about the molestation; Lakshmi wrote, "The lesson was: If you speak up, you will be cast out. [...] I am speaking now because I want us all to fight so that our daughters never know this fear and shame and our sons know that girls' bodies do not exist for their pleasure and that abuse has grave consequences." When she became a naturalized US citizen, Lakshmi officially changed her name to simply Padma Parvati Lakshmi to honor Vijaya.

== Career ==
=== Modeling ===
Lakshmi began her modeling career at age 21, when a modeling agent discovered Lakshmi while she was studying in Madrid. She has said, "I was the first Indian model to have a career in Paris, Milan, and New York. I'm the first one to admit that I was a novelty." Lakshmi was able to pay off her college loans by working as a model and actress.

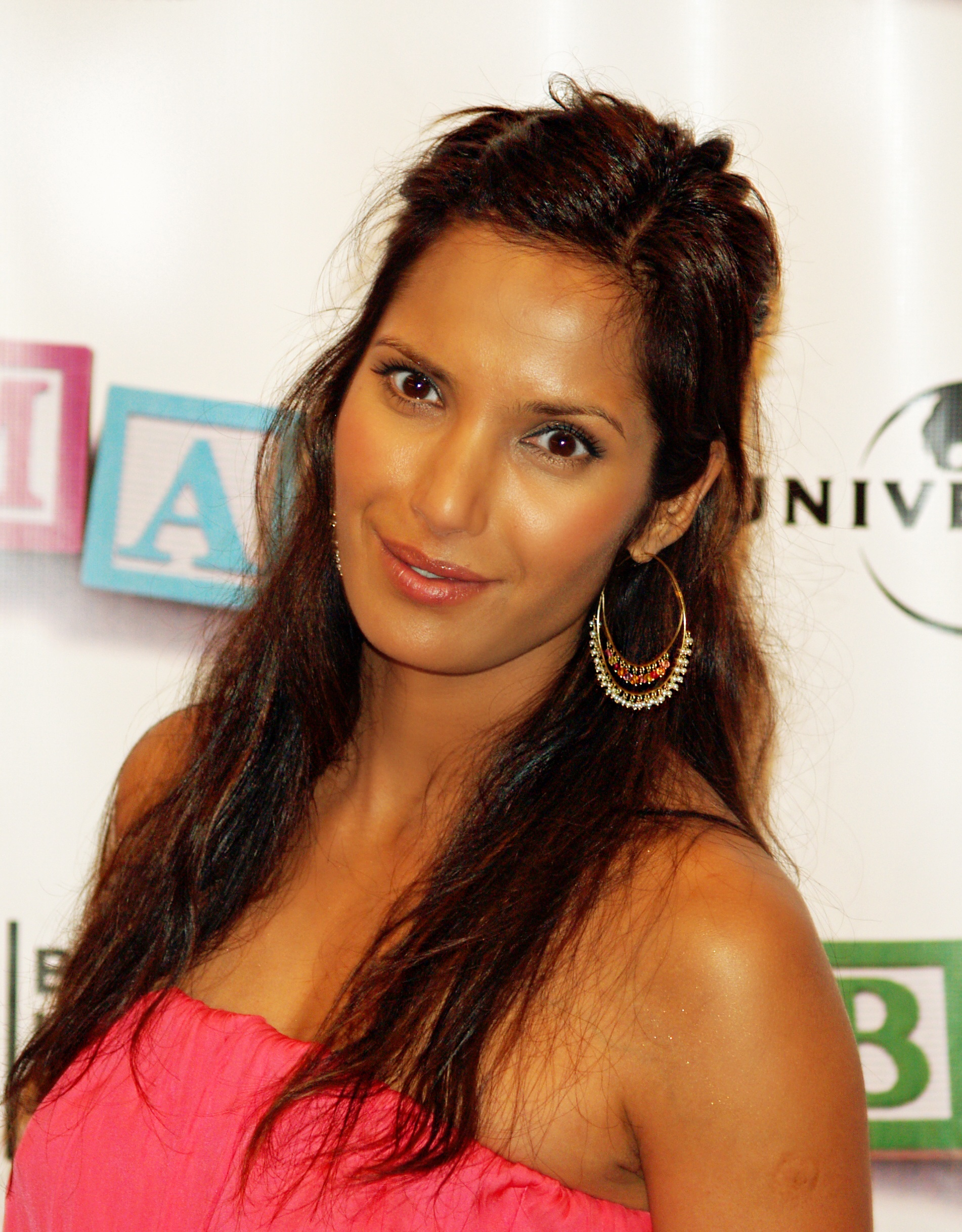
Lakshmi in 2008

She has modeled for designers including Emanuel Ungaro, Giorgio Armani, Gianni Versace, Ralph Lauren, and Alberta Ferretti and appeared in ad campaigns for Roberto Cavalli and Versus. She was a favorite model of the photographer Helmut Newton, whose photographs of her often highlighted the large scar on her right arm. Lakshmi has appeared on the covers of Redbook, Vogue India, FHM, Cosmopolitan, L'Officiel India, Asian Woman, Elle, Avenue, Industry Magazine, Marie Claire (India Edition), Harper's Bazaar, Town & Country, and Newsweek. She also posed nude for the May 2009 issue of Allure. She has done shoots for photographers Mario Testino and Helmut Newton. In 2023, at age 53, she appeared in the Sports Illustrated Swimsuit Issue.

=== Film, television, and hosting ===
Lakshmi served as a host of Domenica In, an Italian program, in 1997. She hosted the Food Network series Padma's Passport, which was part of the larger series Melting Pot in 2001, where she cooked recipes from around the world. She also hosted two one-hour specials in South India and Spain for the British culinary tourism show Planet Food, broadcast on the Food Network in the U.S. and internationally on the Discovery Channels. Lakshmi was also an official contributor for season 19 of The View from 2015 to 2016.

Lakshmi was a host and judge on the television show Top Chef. She also serves as an executive producer of the show. Lakshmi was nominated for the Primetime Emmy Award for Outstanding Host for a Reality or Reality-Competition Program in 2009 and in 2020 through 2022 for Top Chef. In 2020, Lakshmi won three Critic's Choice Awards for Top Chef. In 2023 she departed from the show following the twentieth season.

Lakshmi is also the creator, host, and executive producer of Taste the Nation with Padma Lakshmi, which premiered on Hulu on June 18, 2020, and received the Gotham Award for Breakthrough Series and Critic's Choice Awards for Best Culinary Show in 2021 and 2022. Taste the Nation received 100% on Rotten Tomatoes. In 2021, Hulu released a 4-episode special, Taste the Nation: Holiday Edition. In June 2022, Lakshmi received her first James Beard Foundation Award for Taste the Nation: Holiday Edition.

Her first film roles were in the Italian pirate television miniseries The Son of Sandokan and Caraibi (Pirates: Blood Brothers). She had a comical supporting part as the lip-synching disco singer Sylk in the 2001 American movie Glitter, starring Mariah Carey. In 2002, Lakshmi made an appearance as alien princess Kaitaama in "Precious Cargo," of the TV series Star Trek: Enterprise. She portrayed Madhuvanthi in the TV movie Sharpe's Challenge (aired 2006). In 2006, she appeared in ABC's Biblical TV series The Ten Commandments as Princess Bithia. In 2009, Lakshmi appeared in the video for the Eels song "That Look You Give That Guy."

She starred in the 2003 Bollywood film Boom, alongside Katrina Kaif and Madhu Sapre, as one of three supermodels accused of stealing diamonds. She played the role of Geeta in Paul Mayeda Berges's 2005 film The Mistress of Spices. Lakshmi also made a guest appearance on the NBC series 30 Rock in 2009 and appeared on Whose Line Is It Anyway? in 2014.

=== Books and writing ===
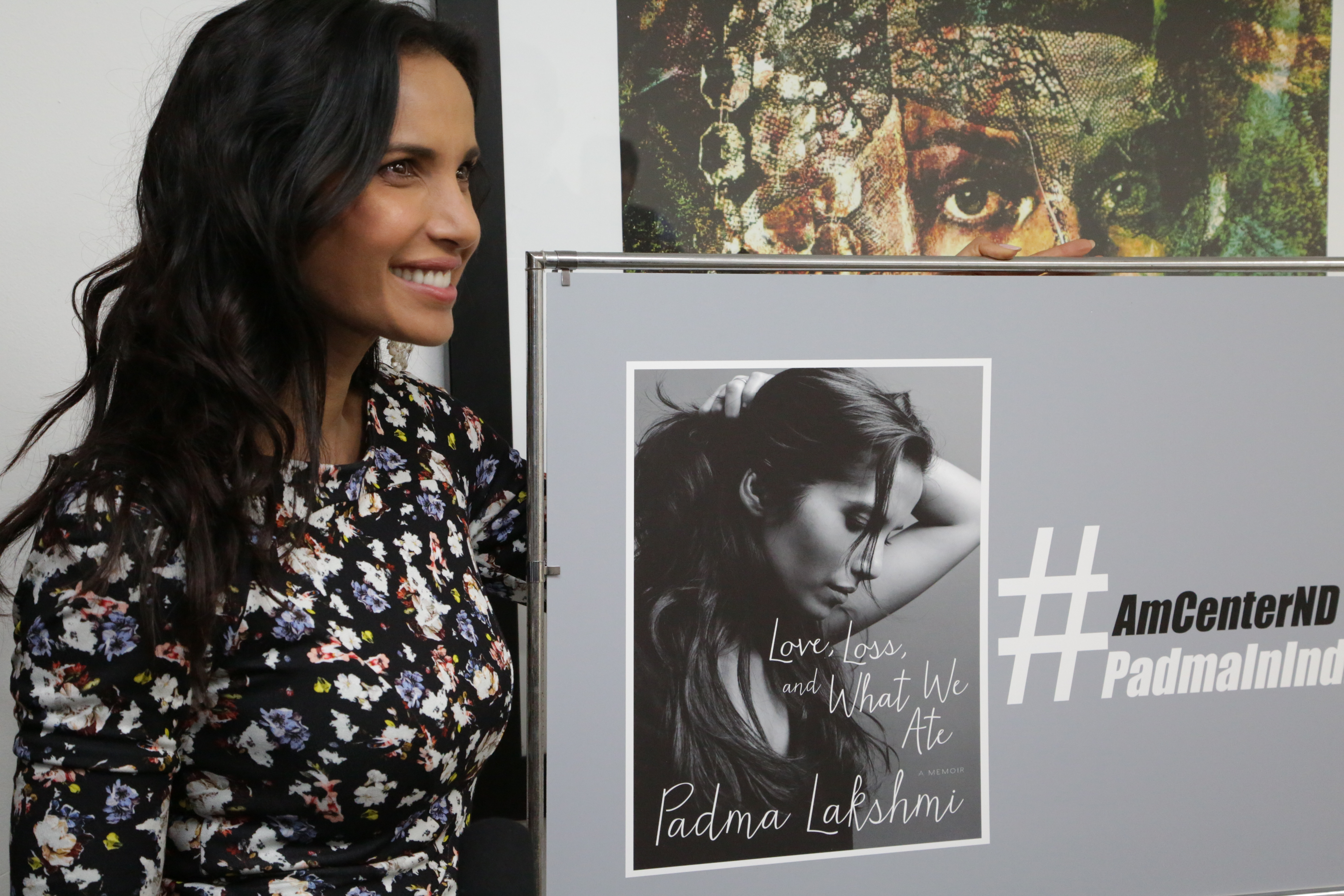
Padma Lakshmi unveiling her book Love, Loss, and What We Ate: A Memoir, in 2017

Lakshmi's first cookbook, Easy Exotic, a compilation of international recipes and short essays released in 1999, was awarded the Best First Book at the 1999 Gourmand World Cookbook Awards in Versailles. Her second cookbook, Tangy, Tart, Hot and Sweet, was released on October 2, 2007, and was reissued in March 2021. Her first memoir, Love, Loss and What We Ate, was released on International's Women's Day, March 8, 2016, and was a The New York Times best-seller. Also in 2016, Lakshmi's third culinary book, an encyclopedia and reference guide, The Encyclopedia of Spices and Herbs: An Essential Guide to the Flavors of the World, was released on October 4. Her first children's book Tomatoes for Neela, released on August 31, 2021, and illustrated by Juana Martinez-Neal, debuted fourth on The New York Times best-seller list.

Lakshmi guest edited The Best American Travel Writing 2021, a collection of essays from renowned travel writers. Lakshmi wrote a syndicated column in The New York Times and has written articles on style for the American edition of Vogue, at editor Anna Wintour's request. She also wrote a column on style for Harper's Bazaar (UK and US editions), following a commission from editor Glenda Bailey.

=== Business endeavors ===
Lakshmi created "The Padma Collection" of fine jewelry that was sold at Bergdorf Goodman, Neiman Marcus, and Nordstrom. Under the same trade name, she designed a home décor line that was sold at all Bloomingdale’s stores. Also, Lakshmi created "Padma’s Easy Exotic", a conglomeration of gastronomic items that included home goods, teas, organic foods, and spice blends, and worked with MAC Cosmetics to create a collection of a small, curated, selections of makeup products for worldwide distribution named "MAC Padma" that soon initially sold out in the United States and India. She launched a lingerie collaboration with Bare Necessities in June 2024 called "Padma X Bare Necessities".

== Charity and advocacy work ==
=== Philanthropy ===
Lakshmi is a co-founder of the Endometriosis Foundation of America, a nonprofit organization focused on increasing awareness, education, research, and legislative advocacy against the disease. The foundation was instrumental in the 2009 opening of the MIT Center for Gynepathology Research, where Lakshmi gave the keynote address.

=== Activism ===
Lakshmi is known as an advocate for immigrant rights, the independent restaurant industry, and women's rights. Lakshmi is the American Civil Liberties Union (ACLU) ambassador for immigration and women's rights. She has also been a critic of skin-lightening creams marketed to people of color. She has also spoken about the colorism she has experienced while living in India and the United States. Lakshmi was appointed United Nations Development Programme Goodwill Ambassador on March 7, 2019. "My main mission as UNDP Goodwill Ambassador is to shine a spotlight on the fact that inequality can affect people in rich and poor countries alike. Many nations have greatly reduced poverty, but inequality has proved more stubborn," said Lakshmi. "Inequality is further compounded by gender, age, ethnicity, and race. It especially affects women, minorities, and others who face unimaginable discrimination in the societies in which they live." In December 2021, she received the Advocate of the Year Award by the United Nations Correspondents Association (UNCA). In October 2022, Lakshmi was honored at the 20th edition of the ACLU's Sing Out For Freedom benefit concert along with Patti Smith and Shaina Taub. Lakshmi was instrumental in the passage of a bill associated with teen health in the New York State Senate.

== Personal life ==
In April 2004, after living together for five years, Lakshmi and novelist Salman Rushdie married. Rushdie stated that Lakshmi asked for a divorce in January 2007, and in July 2007, the couple filed it. She later dated billionaire Theodore J. Forstmann. On February 22, 2010, Lakshmi gave birth to her daughter with businessman Adam Dell.

Lakshmi speaks five languages: Tamil, Hindi, English, Spanish, and Italian. At age 36, Lakshmi was diagnosed with endometriosis, which she has had since early adolescence. In 2016, Lakshmi was awarded the Ellis Island Medal of Honor from the National Ethnic Coalition of Organizations (NECO) and, in 2018, earned the Karma Award from Variety. In 2022, Lakshmi was honored by the Carnegie Corporation of New York's Great Immigrant Award. She was listed among Time magazine's 100 most influential people in the world in 2023. In 2024, Lakshmi was a visiting scholar at the Massachusetts Institute of Technology (MIT), and was bestowed the ICON Award from Boston University's School of Hospitality Administration.

== Selected filmography ==
=== Television ===
Year	Title	Role	Notes
1997	Domenica In	Host	
1998	Il Figlio di Sandokan		
1999	Caraibi – Pirates: Blood Brothers	Malinche	
2000	Linda e il brigadiere	Indian Lady	Episode: "Il fratello di Linda"
2000	Planet Food	Host	Documentary
2001	Melting Pot: Padma's Passport	Host	
2002	Star Trek: Enterprise	Kaitaama	Episode: "Precious Cargo"
2006	The Ten Commandments	Princess Bithia	
2006	Sharpe	Madhuvanthi	Episode: "Sharpe's Challenge"
2006–2023	Top Chef	Host / Judge	Seasons 2–20
2009	30 Rock	Herself	Episode: "The Problem Solvers"
2014	Whose Line Is It Anyway?	Herself	
2014	Royal Pains	Herself	Episode: "A Bridge Not Quite Far Enough"
2015–2016	The View	Herself	
2017	Drop the Mic	Herself	Episode 10 (season 10)
2018	RuPaul's Drag Race	Herself	Episode 2 (season 10)
2019	Butterbean's Café	Chef Belle Legume (Voice)	Episode: "The Towering Tower of Crepes!"
2020–present	Taste the Nation with Padma Lakshmi	Herself, host and executive producer	
2022	Getting Curious With Jonathan Van Ness	Herself, guest and expert	
2023	Big Mouth	Priya (Voice)	
2023	Saturday Night Live	Herself	
2026	America’s Culinary Cup	Host/Judge	

=== Film ===
Year	Title	Role	Notes
1995	Unzipped	Herself	Documentary
2001	Glitter	Sylk	
2003	Boom	Shiela Bardez	
2005	The Mistress of Spices	Geeta	

== Books ==
- Easy Exotic: A Model's Low Fat Recipes From Around the World (1999, Hyperion Books)
- Tangy, Tart, Hot and Sweet: A World of Recipes for Every Day (2007, Hachette Book Group)
- Love, Loss, and What We Ate: A Memoir (2016, Ecco)
- The Encyclopedia of Spices and Herbs: An Essential Guide to the Flavors of the World (2016, HarperCollins)
- Tomatoes for Neela (2021, Viking Children's Books)
- Padma's All American (2025, Knopf)

== See also ==
- Indians in the New York City metropolitan region
- New Yorkers in journalism
