= Gagan Biyani =

American businessman

- Born: May 30, 1987 (age 39)
- Known for: Sprig, Udemy, Lyft
- Website: https://www.gaganbiyani.com

Gagan Biyani (born May 30, 1987) is an American of Indian descent serial entrepreneur, marketer, and journalist.

== Life and career ==
Biyani was born to Indian parents in Fremont, California.

=== Early career ===
Biyani attended the University of California, Berkeley, and received a bachelor's degree in Economics. He began his career working at Accenture before transitioning into technology entrepreneurship and journalism. As a journalist, he covered mobile applications and technology at TechCrunch. While there, he wrote a number of investigative journalism pieces, including one about a PR firm that was writing fake reviews on the App Store. He broke the story in TechCrunch. According to The New York Times, the findings led to an FTC investigation and Biyani's findings were quoted by the FTC's official documents.

=== Udemy ===
In 2009, Biyani co-founded Udemy, one of the first MOOC platforms. Courses are offered across a breadth of categories, including business and entrepreneurship, academics, the arts, health and fitness, language, music, and technology. Most classes are in practical subjects such as Excel software or using an iPhone camera.

At Udemy, Biyani focused mainly on marketing, instructor acquisition, investor relations, finance, business development, and public relations. As of 2018, the company claims to have over 24 million students and offers more than 80,000 courses from thousands of teachers. As of 2019, Alexa counts Udemy among top 500 most-visited websites.

=== Lyft ===
After Udemy, Biyani spent six months as a Growth Advisor at Lyft. He soon left Lyft in 2013 to begin new ventures.

=== Growth Hackers Conference ===
Biyani founded the Growth Hackers Conference in 2013. The event was in San Francisco and featured a number of well-known growth hackers, including Chamath Palihapitiya, Sean Ellis, Keith Rabois, and others.

=== Sprig ===
While at Lyft, Gagan came up with the idea for Sprig. While speaking with friends, he came up with the idea to start a food delivery service. He left Lyft in 2013 to begin the venture into healthy home-cooked food. He partnered with a number of chefs, including Nate Keller, a former Executive Chef at Google's headquarters, and Michelin-starred chef Kyle Connaughton, who served as culinary advisor.

The concept for Sprig was to provide home cooked food via delivery. The startup claimed to allow users to order a “balanced meal”, which was prepared in Sprig's industrial kitchen and delivered in 15–20 minutes. Sprig's chef was Nate Keller, Google's former executive chef.

In March 2014, Sprig raised $10 million in Series A funding from Greylock Partners with Battery Ventures and Accel participating. As part of the funding, Greylock partner Simon Rothman joined Sprig's board. A year later, the company announced it had raised $45 million via its Series B funding round.

In 2016, Biyani and his co-founder Neeraj Berry were named by Forbes in its 30 Under 30 list for Consumer Tech entrepreneurs. Gagan was also part of the Fast Company's Most Creative People list around the same time.

Sprig raised a total of $57 million and had over 1,300 employees at its peak, but announced in late 2017 that it would no longer be operational. In his closing e-mail, Biyani cited challenges in the complexity of the operations as reasons for the closure. According to Biyani's Twitter story about Sprig, one of the causes of Sprig's failure was the rise of Uber Eats. According to TechCrunch, a number of other startups in the same industry also closed in 2017, including venture-backed SpoonRocket and Maple.
