= Komagene =

Turkish fast food company

Yörpaş Regional Foods S.A.
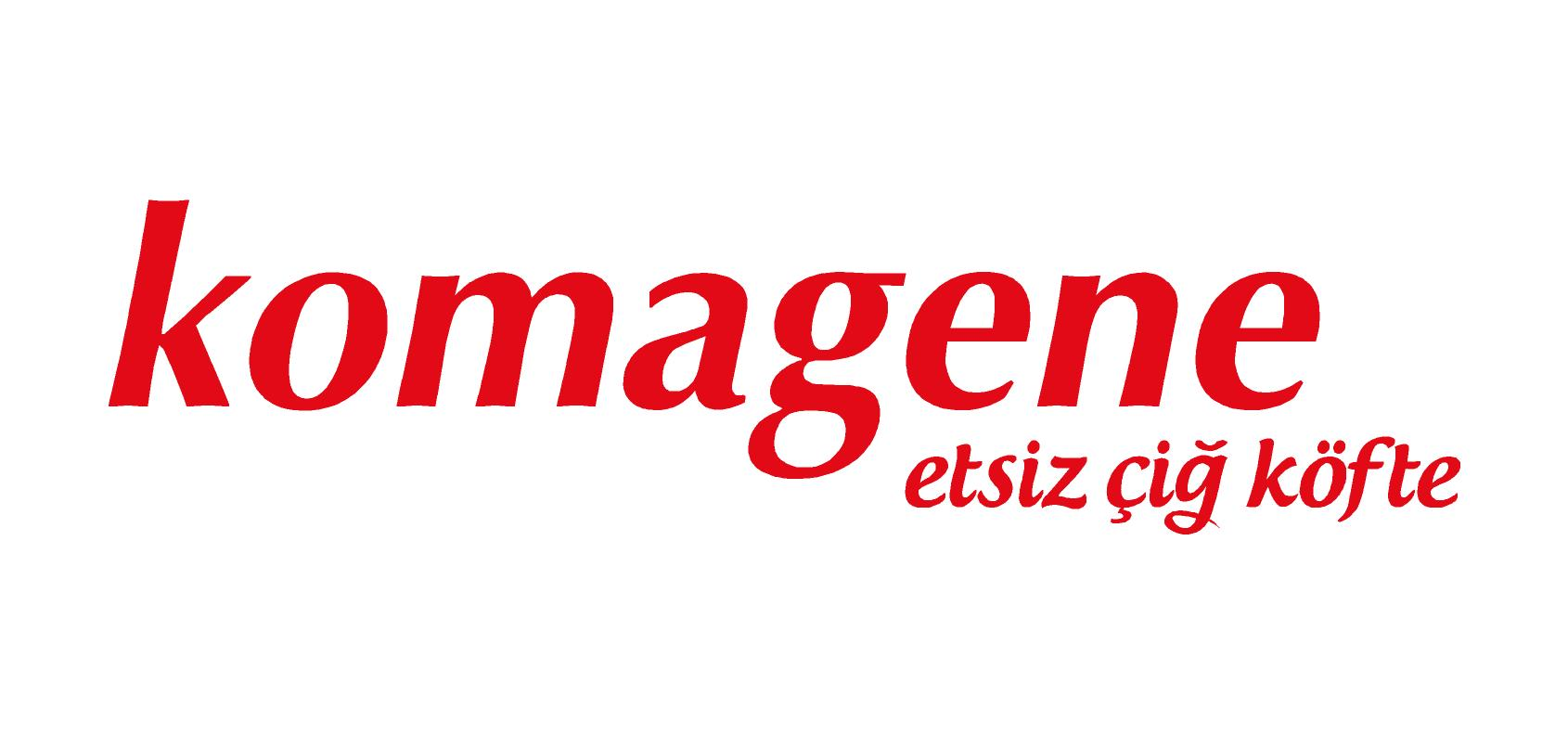
- Type: Anonim şirket
- Industry: Fast food restaurant
- Founded: 2005
- Headquarters: Maltepe, Istanbul
- Key people: Mevlut Tekdemir
- Website: https://www.komagene.com.tr/

Komagene or by its legal name Yörpaş Regional Foods S.A. (Turkish: Yörpaş Yöresel Yiyecekler Pazarlama A.Ş) is a Turkish çiğ köfte company. It was founded in 2005 and the company's name is inspired by the kingdom of Commagene that existed until 72 AD. The headquarters of the company is located in Maltepe, Istanbul.

== Menu items ==
The company has several special menu items, such as the Doritos çiğköfte wrap and the çiğköfte taco that is çiğköfte in lavash folded like a taco.
