= Sütaş =

Turkish dairy producer

Sütaş Süt Ürünleri A.Ş.
- Type: Anonim Şirket
- Industry: Dairy products
- Founded: 1975; 51 years ago in Bursa, Turkey
- Founder: Sadık Yılmaz
- Headquarters: Istanbul, Dudullu OSB, Turkey
- Areas served: Turkey, United States, China, Egypt, Azerbaijan, United Arab Emirates, Qatar, Libya, Iraq, Kuwait and Europe
- Products: strained yogurt, ayran, cheese, kefir, cream, butter, milk, petit suisse
- Website: www.sutas.com.tr

Sütaş Süt Ürünleri A.Ş. (English: Sütaş Dairy Products S.A.) is a Turkish dairy company. The Company's main products include yogurts, ayran, cheese, strained yogurt, clotted cream, kefir, cream, curd cheese, butter, milk, petit suisse and baby and children's products.

== History ==
Sütaş was founded in 1975 in Bursa, Karacabey District, Uluabat settlement. The muhtar of the settlement, Celaleddin Yılmaz, got his first milk tender from Karacabey Stud in 1958. In 1968, Yılmaz bought the land of the nowadays Sütaş factory and turned it into a manufacturing shop. In 1961, he sold kasseri cheese in Beşiktaş and Aksaray bazaars with the "Yılmaz Kasseris" branding. In 1975, his son Sadık Yılmaz established the Sütaş company.

Sütaş has a total of four facilities, three in Turkey, and one in North Macedonia. The company processes 900 million liters of milk every year and offers 77 types of products to its consumers.

== Controversies ==
In July 2014, Sütaş fired 13 workers for being in a union while working at Sütaş. The workers protested this, and Sütaş allegedly poured cow dung on the ground. When this was exposed to the public, COB Muharrem Yılmaz resigned from Turkish Industry and Business Association.
