= Endometriosis Foundation of America =

US medical advocacy organization

EndoFound
- Endometriosis Foundation of America, Inc.
- Abbreviation: EndoFound, EFA
- Formation: 2009; 17 years ago
- Founder: Tamer Seckin and Padma Lakshmi.
- Founded at: New York, New York
- Type: 501(c)(3)
- Registration no.: (EIN) 20-4904437
- Headquarters: New York, New York
- President: Tamer Seckin
- Website: www.endofound.org

The Endometriosis Foundation of America (EndoFound) is a U.S.-based nonprofit organization founded in 2009 by surgeon Tamer Seckin and author Padma Lakshmi to promote early diagnosis, raise public awareness, and improve clinical standards for women with endometriosis. The foundation supports research funding, professional education, patient advocacy, and nationwide outreach events. Its work emphasizes endometriosis as a chronic inflammatory condition with significant reproductive, psychological, and economic impacts. EndoFound also engages in public policy initiatives, including legislative advocacy and the global Endometriosis March, to address widespread diagnostic delays and stigma surrounding menstrual pain.

== History and activities ==
The Endometriosis Foundation of America was founded in 2009 by Tamer Seckin and Padma Lakshmi. The Foundation promotes patient advocacy, education for the medical community and the public, awareness of endometriosis, surgical training, and research. It sponsors yearly conferences for patients, their friends, and physicians on advancing the science and surgery of endometriosis. Its New York City high school, public awareness programs educate school nurses, students, and teachers about endometriosis.

EndoFound sponsors an annual scientific and surgical symposium for patients, scientists, and physicians and the Blossom Ball. Videos from the scientific and surgical symposium as well as publications are online. The Blossom Ball includes women who had endometriosis such as Susan Sarandon, Padma Lakshmi, Whoopi Goldberg, Halsey, and Lena Dunham.

The annual Harry Reich Awards are presented at the Blossom Ball and go to physicians and scientists for medical practice, research, and patient advocacy. The award is named for Harry Reich, a gynecologic laparoscopist, who performed many firsts in surgery.

== Programs and research ==
EndoFound operates several educational programs that aim to improve public and clinical understanding of endometriosis. Its ENPOWR (Endometriosis: Promoting Outreach and Wide Recognition) Project delivers school-based menstrual health education to promote earlier identification of symptoms.The foundation also organizes annual medical conferences featuring updated research on epidemiology, hormonal and immunological mechanisms, and minimally invasive surgical approaches.

Although EndoFound does not conduct primary laboratory research, it funds external studies related to the biological and molecular mechanisms underlying endometriosis. Contemporary medical literature describes the condition as a complex interplay of inflammation, immune dysfunction, neuroangiogenesis, and fibrotic progression. Additional research supported by the organization emphasizes the heterogeneity of lesions and the ongoing challenge of developing accurate non-invasive diagnostic tools.

== Public health and education impact ==
Endometriosis is recognized in current medical scholarship as a significant public health concern, affecting an estimated 5–10% of reproductive-aged individuals worldwide, with an average diagnostic delay of seven to ten years.EndoFound addresses diagnostic and awareness gaps through public campaigns, school-based education, and partnerships with medical institutions to improve provider training.

The organization’s initiatives emphasize symptom normalization, stigma, and the socioeconomic consequences of untreated disease, including reduced quality of life, absenteeism, and barriers to continuous care. Its national awareness efforts contribute to broader public health strategies aimed at increasing menstrual health literacy, expanding access to specialists, and encouraging research investment in gynecologic conditions that have historically been underfunded.

== Criticism and challenges ==
Scholarly discussions of endometriosis advocacy have identified several challenges related to public education and nonprofit engagement. Critics note that awareness campaigns, including those supported by EndoFound, may oversimplify complex medical information or rely heavily on surgical narratives, which do not reflect the experiences of all patients. Broader issues in the field include structural disparities in access to specialized care, inconsistent treatment outcomes, and the absence of reliable non-invasive diagnostic biomarkers.

These challenges are not unique to EndoFound but appear in analyses of how nonprofits influence public understanding of women’s health conditions and medical research priorities.
