= Udemy =

American online learning platform

Udemy, Inc.

- Screenshot
- Company type: wholly owned subsidiary
- Website type: Online education
- Available in: Arabic; English; French; German; Hindi; Italian; Indonesian; Japanese; Korean; Mandarin; Polish; Portuguese; Russian; Spanish; Turkish; Vietnamese
- Founded: May 11, 2010; 16 years ago
- Headquarters: San Francisco, California, United States
- Creators: Eren Bali; Gagan Biyani; Oktay Çağlar
- Key people: Hugo Sarrazin (CEO)
- Industry: SaaS; Education technology
- Revenue: ▲US$786.6 million (2024)
- Operating income: ▼US$−89 million (2024)
- Net income: ▼US$−85 million (2024)
- Total assets: ▲US$605 million (2024)
- Total equity: ▲US$197.4 million (2024)
- Employees: 1,300
- Parent: Coursera
- Website: www.udemy.com
- Commercial: Yes
- Registration: Required
- Users: 81 million (2025)
- Current status: Active

Udemy (/ˈjuːdəmi/ YOO-də-mee) is a US-based education technology company. Founded as a massive open online course (MOOC) provider in 2010 by Eren Bali, Gagan Biyani, and Oktay Caglar; the company is based in San Francisco, California, with offices in the United States, Australia, India, Ireland, Mexico and Turkey. Its education platform allows both the creation and sharing of online courses. Courses are typically video-based and on-demand.

== History ==
In 2007, Eren Bali and Oktay Caglar created a live virtual classroom while living in Turkey. They moved to Silicon Valley two years later, where they founded Udemy with Gagan Biyani in early 2010. In February 2010, the founders tried to raise venture capital funding, but were rejected 30 times, according to Gagan Biyani. They bootstrapped development of the product and launched Udemy in May 2010. Within a few months, 1,000 instructors had created about 2,000 courses. It raised $1 million in venture funding by August 2010. Early on, Udemy was described by some sources as a MOOC platform.

On April 22, 2014, chief operating officer Dennis Yang succeeded Eren Bali as CEO. In November 2015, Udemy was criticized for profiting from pirated courses on its platform. In 2018, the company expanded its existing anti-piracy efforts via Link-Busters. On February 5, 2019, the Udemy board appointed Gregg Coccari as CEO.

As of November 2020, Udemy had raised $273 million in funding from investors, including Tencent Holdings; its valuation was estimated at $3.25 billion; and it had ranked on Fortune's annual Change the World list. By June 2021, Udemy had not generated a profit, with an accumulated deficit of $407.9 million.

On October 29, 2021, Udemy held its IPO in the United States. In February 2023, the company began offering over 100 courses in Hindi. In February 2023, Greg Coccari announced his retirement as CEO and chairman, to be succeeded by Greg Brown. In 2024, Udemy announced that it would be cutting the percentage of revenues that academic labor received. By that September, it had laid off 30% of its employees and announced plans to hire in lower-cost regions.

Co-founder Eren Bali returned as chief technology officer in August 2024. He was replaced by Ozzie Goldschmied in June 2025.

In early 2025, it was announced that Hugo Sarrazin would replace Greg Brown as CEO. Shares in the company fell by 8.5% shortly after, before rebounding in the second quarter. In June 2025 Udemy acquired the image-generation tool Lummi, with the goal of allowing instructors to add AI-generated content to Udemy courses.

In August 2025, Udemy reported its first positive net income since its IPO. The company also began offering its platform in Arabic.

In December 2025, Coursera agreed to acquire Udemy for about $930 million in equity, valuing the combined company at $2.5 billion.

== Products and services ==
Udemy is an online education platform that allows instructors to host online courses and upload videos and other educational materials. Courses are offered in various categories, including business, academics, health and fitness, and music, with most covering practical subjects, such as AWS and Azure training, Excel software, or using an iPhone camera.

Courses on Udemy can be paid or free, depending on the instructor. In 2015, the top 10 instructors made $17 million in total revenue.

In 2013, Udemy offered an app for Apple iOS. The Android version was launched in 2014. As of January 2014, the iOS app had been downloaded over 1 million times, with 20% of its users accessing their courses via mobile. In 2016, Udemy was also accessible via Apple TV.

Introduced in late 2024, the Udemy AI Assistant is a natural language chat interface integrated into the platform, with a "skills mapping" feature. In August 2025, Udemy launched its Model Context Protocol (MCP) server, which embeds training into enterprise and employee workflows.

== See also ==
- List of online educational resources
