= List of Robert College alumni =

The following is a list of notable graduates of Robert College and Robert Academy (RA), American College for Girls (ACG), Robert Yuksek, which were the subsections of Robert College until the merger of 1971.

== A ==
- Halide Edib Adıvar, novelist
- Hranoush Agaganian (Madame Bey), Ottoman-Armenian American boxing trainer and wife of a Turkish diplomat
- Engin Deniz Akarlı, Turkish-American historian; professor emeritus of Modern Middle East History at Brown University
- Serap Aksoy, Turkish-American medical entomologist
- Zeki Alasya, actor
- Safiye Ali, first female Turkish physician
- Fikri Alican, scientist and physician
- Ahmet Altan, journalist and author
- Semahat Arsel, billionaire businesswoman; member of Koç family
- Engin Ardıç, writer
- Fuad Asllani, Albanian lawyer, politician and diplomat; Minister of Foreign Affairs (1935–1936)
- Tomur Atagok, painter, museologist and author
- Türkkaya Ataöv, academic and columnist
- Aslı Aydıntaşbaş, director of the Turkey Project at the Brookings Institution

== B ==
- Gülay Barbarosoğlu, rector of Boğaziçi University (2012–2016)
- Henri Barki, Turkish-Canadian social scientist, who was a Canada Research Chair at the HEC Montréal, Université de Montréal
- Selçuk Bayraktar, engineer and businessperson; chairman and the CTO of Baykar
- Mihri Belli, socialist politician and author
- Seyla Benhabib, Turkish-born American philosopher; professor of law at the Columbia Law School
- Izak Benbasat, professor of management information systems; professor at the Sauder School of Business
- Nihat Berker, professor of physics
- Halil Berktay, historian; professor at the Ibn Haldun University
- Feyyaz Berker, businessperson; co-founder of the Tekfen Holding
- Serdar Bilgili, businessperson; former president of Beşiktaş J.K.
- Refika Birgül, food writer and television presenter
- Lynda Goodsell Blake, American missionary and educator; principal at the American Collegiate Institute (1948–1971)
- Behice Boran, politician
- Cem Boyner, businessman and former politician; chairman of Boyner
- Ayşe Buğra, social scientist; professor at the Boğaziçi University
- Serdar Bulun, physician; chair of Department of Obstetrics and Gynecology at the Feinberg School of Medicine

== C ==
- Alper Çağlar, film director
- Halet Çambel, archaeologist and Olympic fencer; first woman with a Muslim background to compete in the Olympic Games
- Özlem Çarıkçıoğlu, alpine skier, who competed at the 2018 and 2022 Winter Olympics
- Tuncer Cebeci, Turkish-American engineer and academic
- Zeynep Çelik, architect and architectural historian
- İsmail Cem, politician, author and journalist; Minister of Foreign Affairs (1997–2002)
- Burcu Çetinkaya, rally driver and television presenter
- Engin Cezzar, actor and director
- Tansu Çiller, Prime minister of Turkey (1993–1996); Turkey's only female prime minister
- Alev Lytle Croutier, ACG 63, novelist

== D ==
- Ibrahim Dakkak, Palestinian civil engineer and activist
- Arwa Damon, Syrian American journalist; senior international correspondent for CNN
- Bilge Demirköz, physicist; professor at Middle East Technical University
- Xhafer Deva, Albanian politician and entrepreneur; former Minister of Internal Affairs of Albania
- Şükriye Dikmen, painter
- Agop Dilaçar, linguist
- Abidin Dino, artist
- Arif Dirlik, Turkish-American historian who published on historiography and political ideology in modern China
- Sokrat Dodbiba, Albanian politician; Minister of Finance (1943–1944)
- Michalis Dorizas, Greek athlete; bronze medal winner for stone throw and javelin throw in the 1906 Summer Olympics
- Haldun Dormen, actor and playwright
- Tsanko Dyustabanov, Bulgarian revolutionary

== E ==
- Bülent Ecevit, Prime Minister of Turkey (1974; 1977; 1978–79; 1999–2002)
- Rahşan Ecevit, politician
- Nejat Eczacıbaşı, industrialist and entrepreneur; member of Eczacıbaşı family
- Şakir Eczacıbaşı, businessman and photographer; member of Eczacıbaşı family
- Selma Ekrem, Turkish-American writer; published hundreds of essays in The Christian Science Monitor
- Orhan Eralp, diplomat; Permanent Representative of Turkey to the UN (1964–1969, 1978–1980) and NATO (1972–1976)
- Neşe Erberk, businesswoman and former fashion model; Miss Europe '84
- Marcel Erdal, linguist and Turkologist; professor at the Goethe University in Frankfurt
- Aslı Erdoğan, writer
- Refik Erduran, playwright, columnist and writer
- Tunç Erem, academic in international marketing; rector of Marmara University (2002–2006)
- Sedat Ergin, journalist
- Genco Erkal, actor and playwright
- Şenes Erzik, former vice-president of the Union of European Football Associations (UEFA); member of the FIFA Council
- Münir Ertegün, 2nd Ambassador of Turkey to the United States; father of Ahmet Ertegün
- Evgenios Evgenidis, Greek shipping businessperson and benefactor

== F ==
- Moris Farhi, author and vice-president of International PEN (2001–2019)
- Maureen Freely, ACG 71, American journalist, novelist, translator-notably of Orhan Pamuk's works
- Ivan Fichev, Bulgarian general, Minister of Defense and military historian

== G ==
- Karen Gerşon Şarhon, scholar of Judaeo-Spanish
- Emre Gönensay, politician; former Minister of Foreign Affairs
- Ali Haydar Görk, diplomat and former ambassador of Turkey to the United States
- Gilbert Hovey Grosvenor, American magazine editor who was the first full-time editor of the National Geographic (1899–1954); president of the National Geographic Society (1920–1954)
- Calouste Gulbenkian, Ottoman-Armenian born British-Armenian businessman and philanthropist
- Kasım Gülek, politician; secretary-general of the Republican People's Party

== H ==
- Talat Sait Halman, cultural historian; first Minister of Culture of Turkey
- Erdem Helvacıoğlu, composer, sound designer and musician
- Agop Hacikyan, Armenian-Canadian literary scholar and historian; professor at the Royal Military College Saint-Jean

== I ==
- Hasan Halet Işıkpınar, engineer and professor at the Robert College
- Ahmet İsvan, politician; Mayor of Istanbul (1973–1977)
- Todor Ivanchov, politician and Prime Minister of Bulgaria (1899–1901)

== K ==
- Cevat Şakir Kabaağaçlı, author, essayist and tourist guide
- Cemal Kafadar, professor of Middle Eastern history at Harvard University
- Nur al-Din Kahala, Syrian politician during the United Arab Republic
- Cem Karaca, rock singer and songwriter
- Ayla Karacabey, architect who practiced in the United States
- Mehmet Emin Karamehmet, chairman of Çukurova Holding
- Osman Kavala, philanthropist
- Ömer Kavur, film director
- Ömer Ali Kazma, video artist
- Hagop Kevorkian, Ottoman-born Armenian-American art dealer and collector
- Yousef al-Khalidi, politician; Mayor of Jerusalem (1870–1876; 1878–1879; 1899–1906)
- Suna Kıraç, businessperson; member of Koç family
- Osman Kibar, Turkish-American billionaire; founder of Biosplice
- Nemir Kirdar, Iraqi Turkmen banker, billionaire and businessman; founder of Investcorp
- Ömer Koç, businessperson; member of Koç family
- Rahmi Koç, businessperson; member of Koç family
- Göksel Kortay, actress, voice actress, translator and lecturer
- Vasif Kortun, musician, curator
- Spiro Kostof, architectural historian, professor at the University of California, Berkeley
- Karolos Koun, Greek theater director
- Cem Kozlu, businessman, politician and writer
- Shavarsh Krissian, Ottoman-Armenian athlete, writer, educator; editor of Marmnamarz
- Ayşe Kulin, Writer, columnist
- Aptullah Kuran, historian of Ottoman architecture; dean of the Middle East Technical University Faculty of Architecture (1962–1968); first Turkish rector of Boğaziçi University
- Timur Kuran, Turkish-American economist and political scientist; professor at Duke University
- Pınar Kür, novelist, dramatist, and translator

== L ==
- Levon Larents, Armenian writer and journalist
- Skënder Luarasi, Albanian scholar, writer and anti-fascist activist

== M ==
- Perihan Mağden, RC 79, writer and commentator
- Etyen Mahçupyan, columnist and journalist
- M. M. Mangasarian, Ottoman-Armenian born American rationalist and secularist writer
- Arman Manukyan, economist and lecturer at the Boğaziçi University
- Roni Margulies, poet, author, translator and political activist
- Mgirdiç Migiryan, represented the Ottoman Empire in the Olympic Games which was held in Stockholm in 1912
- Konstantin Vladov Muraviev, Bulgarian politician and former Prime Minister of Bulgaria
- Lale Müldür, poet and writer

== N ==
- Gülru Necipoğlu, Turkish American professor of Islamic Art; professor at Harvard University
- Nevra Necipoğlu, Byzantinist and historian; professor at Boğaziçi University
- Leyla Neyzi, anthropologist and oral historian; professor at Sabancı University
- Apostolos Nikolaidis, Greek athlete, football manager and businessman; founder of Panathinaikos
- Sevan Nişanyan, intellectual, travel writer and researcher

== O ==
- Kamil Ocak, politician; Minister of State (1965–1969)
- Fügen Ok, diplomat; Permanent Representative of Turkey to the United Nations (1992–1998)
- John Olcay, Turkish-American financier
- Şehzade Mehmed Orhan Osmanoğlu, Ottoman prince and 42nd head of the Ottoman dynasty
- Hakkı Ögelman, physicist and astrophysicist; professor at Middle East Technical University
- Tamer Önder, molecular biologist; professor at Koç University
- Tolga Örnek, film director
- Cemil Özbal, medical doctor and tambur player
- Ümit Özkan, Turkish-American chemical engineer
- A. Sumru Özsoy, linguist; professor at Boğaziçi University
- Hüsnü Özyeğin, businessman; founder of Finansbank and Fiba Holding

== P ==
- Orhan Pamuk, RA 70, novelist; recipient of the 2006 Nobel Prize in Literature
- Şevket Pamuk, professor of economic history at Boğaziçi University; former president of European Historical Economics Society
- Stefan Panaretov, Bulgarian diplomat; professor at Robert College
- Vahram Papazyan, one of two athletes that represented the Ottoman Empire's first official appearance in the Olympic Games
- Beri Pardo, Portuguese-Turkish association football strategist
- Mihriban Pekgüleryüz, Turkish–Canadian metallurgist; professor at McGill University
- Mihri Pektaş, politician; one of the first 18 female parliament members of Turkey
- Gönül Pultar, novelist and academic
- Mustafa Pultar, academic and writer; professor at Bilkent University

== Q ==
- Parashqevi Qiriazi, Albanian teacher and member of the Congress of Monastir, which decided the Albanian alphabet
- Sevasti Qiriazi, Albanian educator, Protestant missionary and author

== R ==
- Halit Refiğ, film director, writer, producer
- Dani Rodrik, economist; Ford Foundation Professor of International Political Economy at the John F. Kennedy School of Government at Harvard University

== S ==
- Vasileios Sachinis, leader of the Greek World War II resistance in southern Albania/Northern Epirus
- Kenan Sahin, Turkish-born American scientist and entrepreneur
- Selim Sarper, diplomat and politician; Permanent Representative of Turkey to the United Nations and NATO; Minister of Foreign Affairs (1960–1962)
- Nuri Saryal, engineer and academic; rector of Middle East Technical University (1977–1979)
- Çiğdem Selışık Onat, actress
- Serge Semenenko, Hollywood banker and philanthropist
- Nevra Serezli, film, stage, television and voice actress
- Emin Gün Sirer, Turkish-American computer scientist
- Stavro Skëndi, Albanian-American linguist and historian
- Ayşe Soysal, mathematician; rector of Boğaziçi University (2004–2008)
- Mete Sozen, structural engineer; professor of Structural Engineering at Purdue University
- Konstantin Stoilov, 8th Prime Minister of Bulgaria (1877; 1894–1899)
- Eve Sussman, British-born American artist
- Celâl Şengör, RA 73, geologist
- Bülent Şenver, banker and lecturer in finance

== T ==
- Çiğdem Talu, composer
- Ülkü Tamer, poet, journalist, actor and translator
- Korhan Taviloğlu, medical doctor; professor at Istanbul University
- Tosun Terzioğlu, mathematician; president of Sabancı University
- Semih Tezcan, civil engineer; former rector of Boğaziçi University
- Yeram S. Touloukian, American mechanical engineer and academic; director of the Thermophysical Properties Research Center at Purdue University
- Berç Türker Keresteciyan, bank executive; member of the Turkish Grand National Assembly

== U ==
- Galip Ulsoy, mechanical engineer; professor at University of Michigan
- Mîna Urgan, academic, translator, author and socialist politician
- Sadri Usluoğlu, basketball and football player

== V ==
- Gregory Vlastos, ancient philosophy scholar
- İhsan Emre Vural, RC 04, rower, the only Turkish world champion in rowing

== Y ==
- Alp Yalman, businessman; 29th President of Galatasaray SK
- Nur Yalman, social anthropologist; professor at Harvard University; former chairman of Koç University
- Nihal Yeğinobalı, novelist and translator
- K. Aslihan Yener, Turkish-American archaeologist; professor at the University of Chicago

== Z ==
- Faruq Ziada, Iraqi diplomat
- Sıtkı Uğur Ziyal, diplomat
