= Tezcan =

Tezcan (IPA: [ˈtezdʒan]) is a given name and surname for people from Asia Minor. Notable people with the name include:

- Sabri Tezcan, Turkish Olympic fencer
- Şazi Tezcan (1907–1962), Turkish football referee
- Semih Tezcan (born 1932), Turkish scientist
