= Erem =

Erem may refer to:

- Moshe Erem (1896-1978), Israeli politician
- Tim Erem (born 1990), Swedish director
- Tunç Erem (born 1938), Turkish academic

== See also ==
- Érimón
