= Tunc =

Tunc may refer to:

- Tunç, a Turkish given name and surname
- Irène Tunc (1935–1972), French actress and model
- Tunc, one of the two novels comprising The Revolt of Aphrodite by Lawrence Durrell
