= Taviloğlu =

Taviloğlu is a Turkish surname. Notable people with the surname include:

- İstemihan Taviloğlu (1945–2006), Turkish composer and music educator
- Korhan Taviloğlu (born 1962), Turkish surgeon
