= Gönül =

Gönül is a Turkish name and may refer to:

== Given name ==
- Gönül Yazar, Turkish singer
- Gönül Pultar, Turkish scholar and writer

== Surname ==
- Gökhan Gönül, Turkish footballer
- Vecdi Gönül, Turkish politician
