= Gülru Necipoğlu =

Turkish American professor of Islamic Art

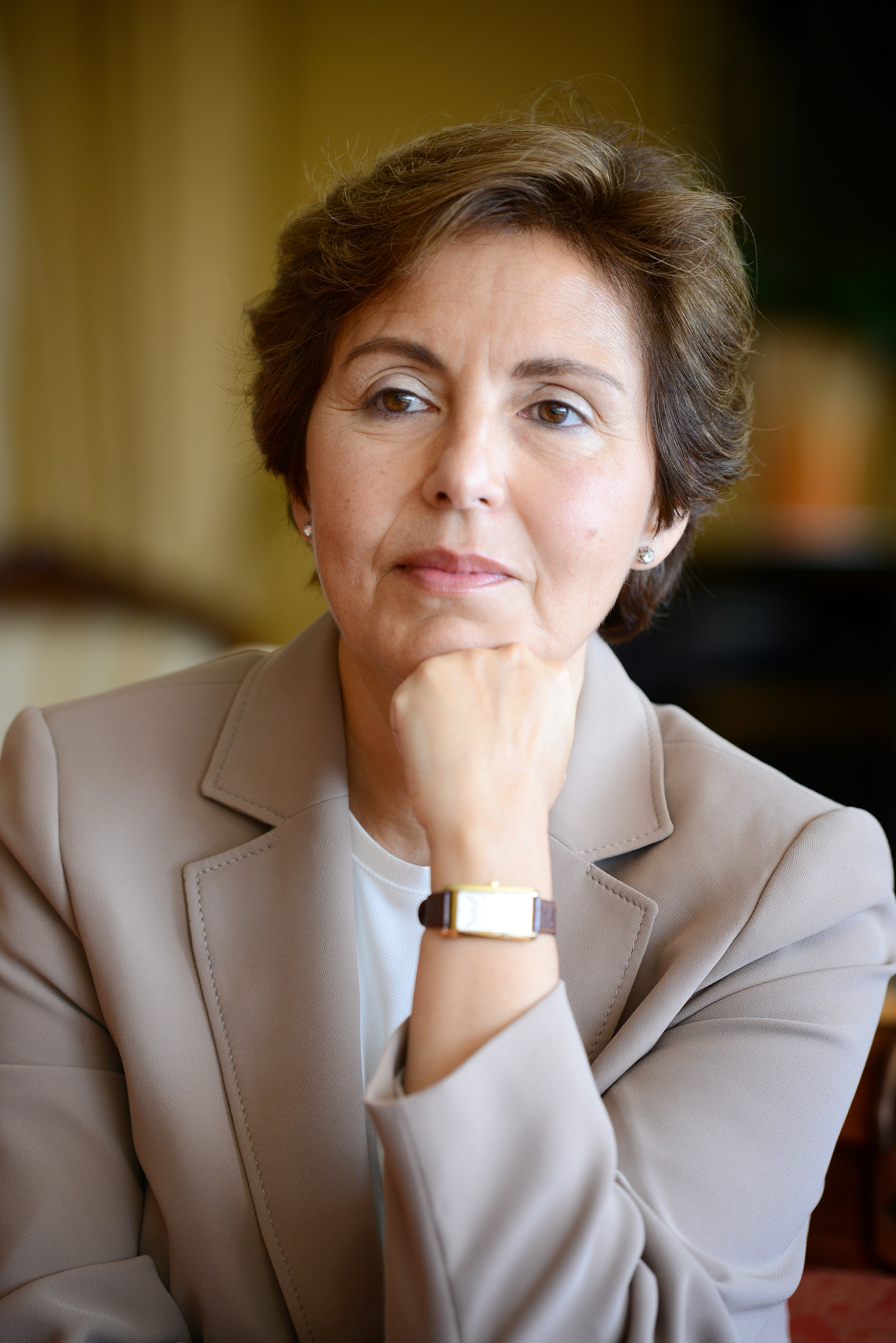
- Born: 1956 (age 69–70); Istanbul, Turkey
- Education: Wesleyan University (BA); Harvard University (MA, PhD)
- Spouse: Cemal Kafadar
- Awards: King Fahd Grand Prize for Excellence of Research in Islamic Architecture (1986): PhD. diss. "Best Article by a Young Author" prize by the Society of Architectural Historians (1986): "Plans and Models in 15th and 16th-Century" "Best Article Published in any Discipline" prize by the Turkish Studies Association (1991): "Süleyman the Magnificent and the Representation of Power" "Best New Book on Architecture and Urban Planning" award of the Association of American Publishers (1995): The Topkapı Scroll "Spiro Kostof Book Award for Architecture and Urbanism" from the Society of Architectural Historians (1996): The Topkapı Scroll "Albert Hourani Book Award" of the Middle East Studies Association (1996): The Topkapı Scroll Albert Hourani Book Award (Honorable Mention) (2005): The Age of Sinan Fuat Köprülü Book Prize (2006): The Age of Sinan Necip Fazıl Book Award in the field of Best Original Research (2014): Sinan Çağı "26th World Award for Book of the Year" of Iran's Ministry of Culture (2019): The Arts of Ornamental Geography MELA (Middle East Librarians Association) Book Award Honorable Mention (2021): Treasures of Knowledge Lifelong Achievement Award "Contribution to Architecture" (Mimarlığa Katkı, 2021),14th Annual Architecture Awards, by the Turkish Professional Architects Association (Türk Serbest Mimarlar Derneği) "Art Historian of the Year Award," (2022) by the Academic Selection Committee of Tumbifed (Federation of Bureaucrats and Businesspersons / Tüm Bürokratlar ve İş İnsanları Federasyonu) in Turkey, Istanbul "The Charles Lang Freer Medal," (2023) Smithsonian, National Museum of Asian Art (Acknowledges scholars with exemplary contributions to research and scholarship on the Arts of Asia), Washington D.C.
- Scientific career
- Fields: Islamic art and architecture, Ottoman architecture, aesthetic cosmopolitanism, transregional connectivity, geometric design, ornament, critical historiography and Orientalism
- Workplaces: Harvard University
- Doctoral advisor: Oleg Grabar

Gülru Necipoğlu (born 3 April 1956 in Istanbul) is a Turkish American professor of Islamic Art/Architecture. She has been the Aga Khan Professor and Director of the Aga Khan Program for Islamic Architecture at Harvard University since 1993, where she started teaching as assistant professor in 1987. She received her Harvard Ph.D. in the Department of History of Art and Architecture (1986), her BA in Art History at Wesleyan (Summa Cum Laude, 1979), her high school degree in Robert College, Istanbul (1975). She is married to the Ottoman historian and Harvard University professor Cemal Kafadar. Her sister is the historian Nevra Necipoğlu.

Necipoğlu is an elected member of the American Philosophical Society, American Academy of Arts and Sciences, the British Academy, and Centro Internazionale di Studi di Archittettura Andrea Palladio in Vicenza. She has recently been awarded "The Charles Lang Freer Medal" by the Smithsonian, National Museum of Asian Art (which acknowledges scholars with exemplary contributions to research and scholarship on the Arts of Asia), Washington D.C. 2023. She was an invited faculty scholar at Kunsthistorisches Institut in Florenz-Max-Planck-Institut (2013, 2014), and the Slade Professor of Fine Art at the University of Cambridge (2013). Her prize-winning books are: The Arts of Ornamental Geometry (2017); The Age of Sinan (2005), The Topkapı Scroll (1996). Her books and numerous essays have appeared in English, Turkish, French, Spanish, Persian, and Arabic.

Necipoğlu specializes in premodern Islamic arts/architecture, especially the Mediterranean and Eastern Islamic lands. Her publications address aesthetic cosmopolitanism, transregional connectivity between early modern empires (Ottoman, Safavid, Mughal), artistic exchanges with Byzantium and Renaissance Europe, plans, and drawings in pre-modern architectural practice, aesthetics of abstraction, and geometric ornament. Her critical interests encompass methodological and historiographical issues in modern constructions of the field of Islamic art and Orientalism.

== Career and works ==
Necipoğlu graduated from the Robert College of Istanbul in 1975. She received a degree in art history with a concentration on Late Medieval and Renaissance periods from Wesleyan University in 1979. She attended the Williams College junior-year exchange program in 1978. In 1982, she received a master's degree in Islamic art and architecture from Harvard University, where she obtained her Ph.D. in 1986 with a dissertation titled, The Formation of an Ottoman Imperial Tradition: The Topkapı Palace in the 15th and 16th Centuries, under the supervision of Oleg Grabar. Her Ph.D. dissertation was the winner of the King Fahd Grand Prize for Excellence of Research in Islamic Architecture (1986). Based on her research project as Mellon Post-Doctoral Fellow at Columbia University (1986–87), she published "The Life of an Imperial Monument: Hagia Sophia after Byzantium," in Hagia Sophia: From the Age of Justinian to the Present, ed. Robert Mark and Ahmet Çakmak (1992). An abridged Turkish translation of this now timely study appeared in Toplumsal Tarih 254 (2015).

One of Necipoğlu's earliest articles, "Plans and Models in 15th and 16th-Century Ottoman Architectural Practice" won the Society of Architectural Historians Best Article by a Young Author prize (1986). Her article, "Süleyman the Magnificent and the Representation of Power in the Context of Ottoman-Hapsburg-Papal Rivalry" was awarded the Best Article Published in any Discipline prize by the Turkish Studies Association (1991).

Her first book Architecture, Ceremonial and Power: The Topkapı Palace in the Fifteenth and Sixteenth Centuries (MIT, 1991) was supported by grants from the Architectural History Foundation and College Art Association. Aptullah Kuran's book jacket endorsement judges this study as "One of the principal works about Ottoman architectural history." The author's novel analytical synthesis is praised in Howard Crane's 1996 review: "It is the great strength of Professor Necipoğlu's book that she elaborates in a lucid and precise manner this connection between architectural form and function, a physical arrangement and symbolism. Architecture, Ceremonial, and Power is a model of both exacting scholarship and thoughtful interpretation, and serves to bring to life that monument which is surely one of the keys to the understanding of the Ottoman concept of imperial absolutism." The extensive corpus of primary sources introduced in the book reveal the dialogues and parallelisms between Byzantine, Italianate, Islamicate-Ottoman architectural cultures and practices. Priscilla Soucek states in her 1994 review that "Necipoğlu has provided a solid foundation for future consideration of matters relating to Ottoman palatial architecture and court ceremonial, a truly admirable achievement." This book, accepted as "a landmark" in the field, is one of the earliest scholarly attempts to interpret the architectural program of the Topkapı Palace in Istanbul. Necipoğlu's reading of this allegedly "modest" monument's ambitious imperial agenda opened up new vistas for studies on Islamic palatial architecture (a subject broadly explored in her edited volume, Palaces in the Pre-Modern Islamic World, Special Issue, Ars Orientalis, vol. 23, 1993, containing her introduction, "Shifting Paradigms in the Palatial Architecture of the Pre-Modern Islamic World," and her influential essay, "Framing of the Gaze in Ottoman, Safavid, and Mughal Palaces." The Turkish translation of her book, 15. ve 16. yüzyılda Topkapı Sarayı: Mimari, Tören ve İktidar, was published in 2007 (reprint 2014).

Necipoğlu's The Topkapı Scroll—Geometry and Ornament in Islamic Architecture (Getty, 1995) won the "Best New Book on Architecture and Urban Planning" award of the Association of American Publishers. In 1996, it received two further awards: the Spiro Kostof Book Award for Architecture and Urbanism from the Society of Architectural Historians, and the Albert Hourani Book Award of the Middle East Studies Association. The book interprets central defining themes of Islamic art such as geometric ornament and the muqarnas, through the hitherto overlooked centrality of designs on paper in premodern architectural practice. It features the facsimile of a unique 30-meter design scroll, with two- and three-dimensional geometric patterns and calligraphy for architectural ornament, which she attributes to late fifteenth-century Timurid-Turkmen Iran, particularly Tabriz. Her book demonstrates the crucial role of mathematical sciences in the theory and practice of architecture and the ornamental geometric mode known as girih. In his book review, Walter Denny remarks that "This theme of relation between science and art in Islam has been so often repeated in survey texts as to have become almost a cliché, but the actual relationships between theoretical studies and what Necipoğlu calls 'practical geometry' used in the creation of art have never before been carefully and meticulously linked to this degree in the literature." In her seminal work, Necipoğlu challenges orientalist and reductionist assumptions regarding the meaning and function of geometry in Islamic art. She investigates in depth the intellectual and cultural contexts of the scroll, exploring multiple meanings and perceptions of geometrical designs in line with philosophical and aesthetic theories current in the medieval Islamic world. Oleg Grabar's book jacket endorsement reads, "Just about the best book on Islamic art for the past one hundred years. It is a masterpiece that establishes our understanding of why geometry became so important in Islamic art." According to Priscilla Soucek, the book "goes far beyond the explication of a set of architectural drawings. Its ambitious scope and painstaking documentation provide a new foundation for considering the role of geometric ornament in the visual traditions of the medieval Islamic world, and indeed initiate a wider debate about how to interpret the other ornamental traditions used in pre-modern Islamic regions." Godfrey Goodwin lauds Necipoğlu's intellectual analysis as "immaculate" and remarks that "For anyone seriously studying Islamic art and the concepts underlying it, this work is and will be essential reading. New details may be added in time, but it will not be surpassed. It creates its own infinity." George Saliba, however, was considerably more critical in his lengthy review, questioning not only the linkages drawn between the "geometric features of Islamic art" and "theoretical works on mathematics" but also the book's supposed reliance on "primary-source references . . . translated into European languages": a reliance that, he claimed, introduced "nuances . . . not present in the original." The Topkapı Scroll was translated into Persian in 2000. The Getty Virtual Library provides a full copy of the book in English.

A related subject is explored in Necipoğlu's edited book (Brill, 2017), The Arts of Ornamental Geometry: A Persian Compendium on Similar and Complementary Interlocking Figures, beginning with her opening essay, "Ornamental Geometries: An Anonymous Persian Compendium at the Intersection of the Visual Arts and Mathematical Sciences." This book was selected one of the best new works in the field of Islamic / Iranian Studies, and was a winner of the "26th World Award for Book of the Year" of Iran's Ministry of Culture. It includes the facsimile of a unique medieval document in Persian (c. 1300) containing geometrical drawings of complex patterns and muqarnas, with practical textual instructions on how to draw them. Since its publication, the book became a significant source for historians of art, architecture, and history of science as well as mathematicians, physicists, artists, and architects.

Necipoğlu's 2005 book (Reaktion, second edn. 2011), The Age of Sinan: Architectural Culture in the Ottoman Empire received the Albert Hourani Book Award (Honorable Mention), and the Fuat Köprülü Book Prize of Turkish Studies Association. Its expanded Turkish translation, Sinan Çağı: Osmanlı İmparatorluğu'nda Mimari Kültür (Bilgi, 2013, reprint 2017) received the Necip Fazıl Book Award in the field of Best Original Research (2014). The book attracted world-wide acclaim for its innovative interpretation of works by the renowned chief architect Sinan (d. 1588), from the perspective of his "codification of decorum" in canonical Ottoman architecture according to the "relative status of patrons and building sites." Previous scholarship on Sinan's oeuvre was dominated by the chronological development of his style, as Howard Crane notes, "It is the great strength of Necipoğlu's work that she transcends this formalist paradigm and, by means of a truly groundbreaking examination of the rich but hitherto unexplored corpus of surviving documentary sources – archival records, vakfiyes, contemporary historical, diplomatic, and travel accounts – establishes the historical context for the chief architect's work." The approach in this book is considered a break from established paradigms. It situates Ottoman architectural culture in the larger early modern Mediterranean region and sheds light on cross-cultural dialogues with Italian Renaissance architecture. In her review, Catherine Asher concludes, "The volume is a magnum opus concerning sixteenth-century Ottoman Turkey. Necipoğlu has produced a work encyclopedic in scope, providing tremendous new and illuminating insight on Sinan and his milieu."

Necipoğlu has been the editor of the journal Muqarnas: An Annual on the Visual Cultures of the Islamic World since 1993, vols. 10-37 (Brill), and its Supplements. Her edited books on diverse subjects include, Histories of Ornament: From Global to Local (Princeton, 2016) co-edited with Alina Payne. This volume was hailed "the first major global history of ornament from the Middle Ages to today," offering a novel critical interpretation of the histories of ornament in a global perspective. It is acclaimed as a pioneering work providing "a remarkable new perspective on the study of ornament." The essays provide original interpretations on the function of ornament, raising broader questions on historiography, transcultural exchanges, agency, materiality, intermediality, ornament and abstraction, portability, and the circulation of concepts, forms, goods, and people.

Necipoğlu co-edited with F. Barry Flood A Companion to Islamic Art and Architecture, (Wiley Blackwell Companions to Art History, 2 vols., 2017). With over fifty commissioned essays, it has become an essential handbook for professors, students, and enthusiasts. The volumes are organized according to a new chronological-geographical paradigm that challenges existing scholarship and notably remaps the field by providing a historical-critical approach. The co-authors' introductory essay explains this reconceptualization, "Frameworks of Islamic Art and Architectural History: Concepts, Approaches, and Historiographies."

Most recently, Necipoğlu co-edited with two major historians Cemal Kafadar and Cornell Fleischer, Treasures of Knowledge: An Inventory of the Ottoman Palace Library, 1502/3- 1503/4 (Brill, 2019). This two-volume work focuses on a fascinating manuscript preserved in the Library of the Hungarian Academy of Sciences in Budapest, which catalogs the book collection of the Ottoman Sultans Mehmed II and Bayezid II kept in the Topkapı Palace Treasury, prepared by the court librarian. Necipoğlu's introductory essay interprets this document from diverse angles, "The Spatial Organization of Knowledge in the Ottoman Palace Library: An Encyclopedic Collection and Its Inventory." The 28 essays in vol. 1, over 1,000 pages, analyze books written in Arabic, Persian, Turkish, and "Mongolian," on specific fields of knowledge, according to which the inventory was organized, spanning from rational theology, Islamic jurisprudence, Sufism, ethics, and politics, to literature and the mathematical sciences. Vol. 2 provides a facsimile with transliteration. Fabrizio Speziale recognizes the work as a major contribution to the study of "the history, the role, and the organization of libraries in Muslim societies, as well as their links with other Muslim cultural and political institutions, which remain topics still insufficiently studied in recent scholarship." Konrad Hirschler's review of this "massive" and "ground-breaking study that will remain with us for many decades," judges it "a wonderful book that is a must-read for anyone interested in Ottoman studies or the history of ideas or libraries."

Necipoğlu's name was given to a new lecture hall of the Art History Department of Akdeniz University, Turkey in 2012. In 2014, she was mentioned among the 91 most influential women in the history of the Turkish Republic on its 91st anniversary celebration. She was invited by His Highness the Aga Khan to serve as a member of the steering committee of the Aga Khan Architecture Award for the 3-year cycle 2015–2018.

In January 2023, she was announced as one of the recipients of The National Museum of Asian Art's 2023 Freer Medals. She was awarded the Freer medal on October 27, 2023.

== Selected bibliography ==
=== Books and edited volumes ===
- Editor of Muqarnas: An Annual on the Visual Cultures of the Islamic World (Leiden and Boston: Brill, since 1993).
- Editor of Studies and Sources on Islamic Art and Architecture: Supplements to Muqarnas (Leiden and Boston: Brill, since 1993)
- Treasures of Knowledge: An Inventory of the Ottoman Palace Library (1502/3-1503/4), 2 vols., ed. Gülru Necipoğlu, Cemal Kafadar, Cornell H. Fleischer (Supplements to Muqarnas, vol. 14, Leiden and Boston: Brill, 2019).
- A Companion to Islamic Art and Architecture, ed. Finbarr Barry Flood and Gülru Necipoğlu, Wiley Blackwell Companions to Art History, 2 vols. (Hoboken, New Jersey: John Wiley & Sons, 2017).
- The Arts of Ornamental Geometry: A Persian Compendium on Similar and Complementary Interlocking Figures, ed. Gülru Necipoğlu (Supplements to Muqarnas, vol. 13, Leiden: Brill, 2017).
- Histories of Ornament: From Global to Local, ed. Gülru Necipoğlu and Alina Payne (Princeton, New Jersey: Princeton University Press, 2016).
- Sinan Çağı: Osmanlı İmparatorluğu'nda Mimarî Kültür, trans. Gül Çağalı-Güven, (Istanbul: Bilgi University Press, 2013, second edn. 2017): Expanded Turkish translation of The Age of Sinan: Architectural Culture in the Ottoman Empire (London: Reaktion Books, 2006, second edn. 2011).
- Sinan's Autobiographies: Five Sixteenth-Century Texts. Introductory Notes, Critical Editions, and Translations by Howard Crane and Esra Akın. Edited with a Preface by Gülru Necipoğlu (Supplements to Muqarnas, vol. 11, Leiden and Boston: Brill, 2006).
- The Age of Sinan: Architectural Culture in the Ottoman Empire (London: Reaktion Books, with Princeton University Press, 2005). [Revised second edition, London: Reaktion Books, with the University of Chicago Press, 2011].
- 15. ve 16. Yüzyılda Topkapı Sarayı: Mimari, Tören ve İktidar, trans. Ruşen Sezer (Yapı ve Kredi Bankası, Istanbul, 2007, reprint 2014).
- Persian Translation of The Topkapı Scroll book by Mihrdad Qayyumi Bidhindi, Handasa va Tazyin dar Mi'mari-yi Islami: Tomar-i Topkapı (Tehran: Kitabkhana-yi Milli-yi Iran, 1379).
- The Topkapı Scroll—Geometry and Ornament in Islamic Architecture, The Getty Center for the History of Art and the Humanities, distributed by Oxford University Press, 1995. [The Getty Virtual Library link to the full copy of the book The Topkapı Scroll—Geometry and Ornament in Islamic Architecture is: https://www.getty.edu/publications/virtuallibrary/9780892363353.html. It is also linked on the Gülru Necipoğlu Harvard University publications page.
- Palaces in the Pre-Modern Islamic World, ed. Gülru Necipoğlu, Special Issue of Ars Orientalis, 23 (1993), with her introduction and essay: "Shifting Paradigms in the Palatial Architecture of the Pre-Modern Islamic World" (3-27); "Framing of the Gaze in Ottoman, Safavid, and Mughal Palaces" (303–42).
- Architecture, Ceremonial and Power: The Topkapı Palace in the Fifteenth and Sixteenth Centuries (Boston: M.I.T. and The Architectural History Foundation, 1991).

=== Recent essays ===
- "Zeren Tanındı'yı Tanımak: Hatıralardan Devşirilmiş Bir Demet," in ed. Aslıhan Erkmen and Şebnem Tamcan Parladır, Zeren Tanındı Armağanı: İslam Dünyasında Kitap Sanatı ve Kültürü (Istanbul: Lale Yayıncılık, 2022).
- "The Mangalia Mosque in the Waqf Empire of an Ottoman Power-Couple: Princess İsmihan Sultan and Sokollu Mehmed Pasha," in ed. Alina Payne, Land Between Two Seas: Art on the Move in the Mediterranean and the Black Sea 1300-1700 (Leiden and Boston: Brill, 2022).
- "Volatile Urban Landscapes between Mythical Space and Time," in Çiğdem Kafescioğlu and Shirine Hamadeh ed., A Companion to early modern Istanbul(Leiden and Boston: Brill, October 2021).
- "Transregional Connections: Architecture and the Construction of Early Modern Islamic Empires," in ed. Roda Ahluwalia, Reflections on Mughal Art and Culture (New Delhi: Niyogi Books, 2021).
- "The Spatial Organization of Knowledge in the Ottoman Palace Library: An Encyclopedic Collection and Its Inventory," "Appendix III with Plates from Manuscripts at the Topkapı Palace Museum Library," and "Appendix IV Translation of 'Atufi's Ottoman Turkish Preface to the Palace Library Inventory" in Treasures of Knowledge: An Inventory of the Ottoman Palace Library (1502/3-1503/4), 2 vols., ed. Gülru Necipoğlu, Cemal Kafadar, Cornell H. Fleischer, vol. 1: 1-77, 1011-1075 (Supplements to Muqarnas, vol. 14, Leiden and Boston: Brill, 2019).
- "Frameworks of Islamic Art and Architecture: Concepts, Approaches and Historiographies," and section introductions, co-authored with Finbarr Barry Flood, in Companion to Islamic Art and Architecture, eds. Finbarr Barry Flood and Gülru Necipoğlu, "Wiley-Blackwell Companion to Art History" series 2 vols., vol. 1 (Wiley, 2017).
- "The Aesthetics of Empire: Arts, Politics, and Commerce in the Construction of Sultan Süleyman's Magnificence," in ed. Pál Fodor, The Battle for Central Europe (Leiden, 2019).
- "Architectural Dialogues Across the Eastern Mediterranean: Domed Sanctuaries in the Ottoman Empire and Renaissance Italy," in ed. Alina Payne, The Companion to the History of Architecture: Renaissance and Baroque (Princeton, 2017).
- "Ornamental Geometries: An Anonymous Persian Compendium at the Intersection of Visual Arts and Mathematical Sciences," Chapter 1, in The Arts of Ornamental Geometry: A Persian Compendium on Similar and Complementary Interlocking Figures (Fī Tadākhul al-ashkāl al-mutashābiha aw al-mutawāfiqa, Bibliothèque nationale de France, Ms. Persan 169, fols. 180r–199v), edited by Gülru Necipoğlu (Brill, Supplements to Muqarnas, 2017). A volume commemorating Alpay Özdural, with my introduction, titled "In Memory of Alpay Özdural and His Unrealized Book Project," 1-10, 11-78.
- "Early Modern Floral: The Agency of Ornament in Ottoman and Safavid Visual Cultures," in Histories of Ornament: From Global to Local, eds. Gülru Necipoğlu and Alina Payne (Princeton, 2016).
- "Persianate Images between Europe and China: The 'Frankish Manner' in the Diez and Topkapı Albums, c. 1350-1450," in The Diez Albums, eds. Julia Gonella, Friederike Weis, Christoph Rauch (Leiden, 2016).
- "Mimar Sinan Çağında Mimarlık Kültürü ve Âdâb: Günümüze Yönelik Yorumlar (Architectural Culture and Decorum in the Age of Sinan: Interpretations with a View to Our Times," in eds. Hatice Aynur and A. Hilal Uğurlu, Ekrem Hakkı Ayverdi'nin Hatırasına Osmanlı Mimarlık Kültürü (Istanbul, 2016).
- "The Scrutinizing Gaze in the Aesthetics of Islamic Visual Cultures: Sight, Insight and Desire," Muqarnas 32 (2015).
- "Aesthetics of Islamic Ornament in the Sixteenth-Century: Ottoman-Safavid Visual Conversations," Hadeeth ad-Dar (Dar al-Athar al-Islamiyyah, Kuwait National Museum, 2015).
- "Connectivity, Mobility and 'Portable Archaeology': Pashas from the Dalmatian Hinterland as Cultural Mediators," in ed. Alina Payne, Dalmatia and the Mediterranean. Portable Archaeology and the Poetics of Influence (Leiden, 2014).
- "'Virtual Archaeology' in Light of a New Document on the Topkapı Palace's Waterworks and Earliest Buildings, ca. 1509," Muqarnas 30 (2013): 315–50.
- "Visual Cosmopolitanism and Creative Translation: Artistic Conversations with Renaissance Italy in Mehmed II's Constantinople," Muqarnas 29 (2012).
- "The Concept of Islamic Art: Inherited Discourses and New Approaches," in Islamic Art and the Museum: Approaches to Art and Archaeology of the Muslim World in the Twenty-First Century, eds. Benoît Junod, Georges Khalil, Stefan Weber, Gerhard Wolf (London, 2012). Electronically reproduced in The Journal of Art Historiography, 2012, vol. 6.
