= Boğaziçi University Sports Fest =

Student sports festival in Turkey

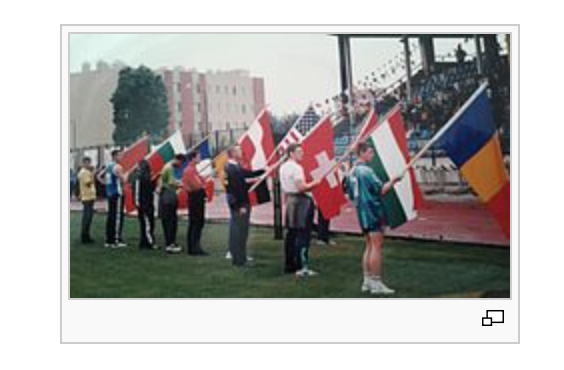
Boğaziçi University Sports Fest in 2016

Boğaziçi University Sports Fest is Turkey's biggest student-organized sports festival, held in Boğaziçi University facilities every year since 1980 with the original name ''Spor Bayramı''. This festival includes contributions from both the school and students of Boğaziçi University, and participation of hundreds of sportsmen from around the world.

== Sports Committee ==
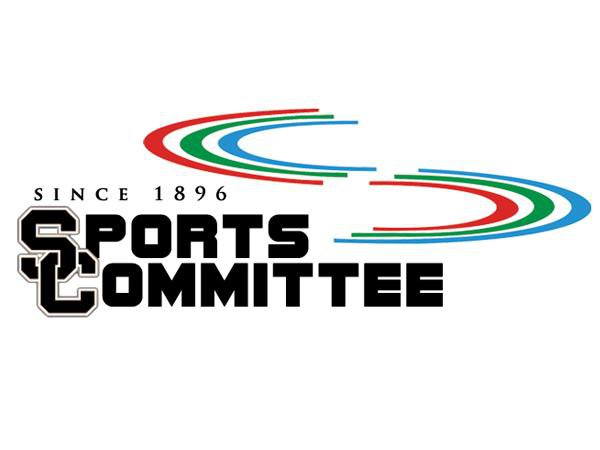
Logo of the Sports Committee

The Sports Committee traces its roots back to "The Athletics Association" founded in 1896 at Robert College. This organization was also the first student association to be established in Turkey. The Sports Committee's aim, as one of the main parts of social life in Boğaziçi University, is to create a sportive environment with its numerous organizations. For the past 120 years, the Sports Committee has been arranging all the sports events in the university. Binding 800 sportsmen in 23 different branches of sports under its root, this association also has various events including Boğaziçi University Sports Awards, SnowBreak, Field Day, Fall Games, Interfaculty Tournament, Water Sports Weekend and Sports Fest.

== Boğaziçi University ==
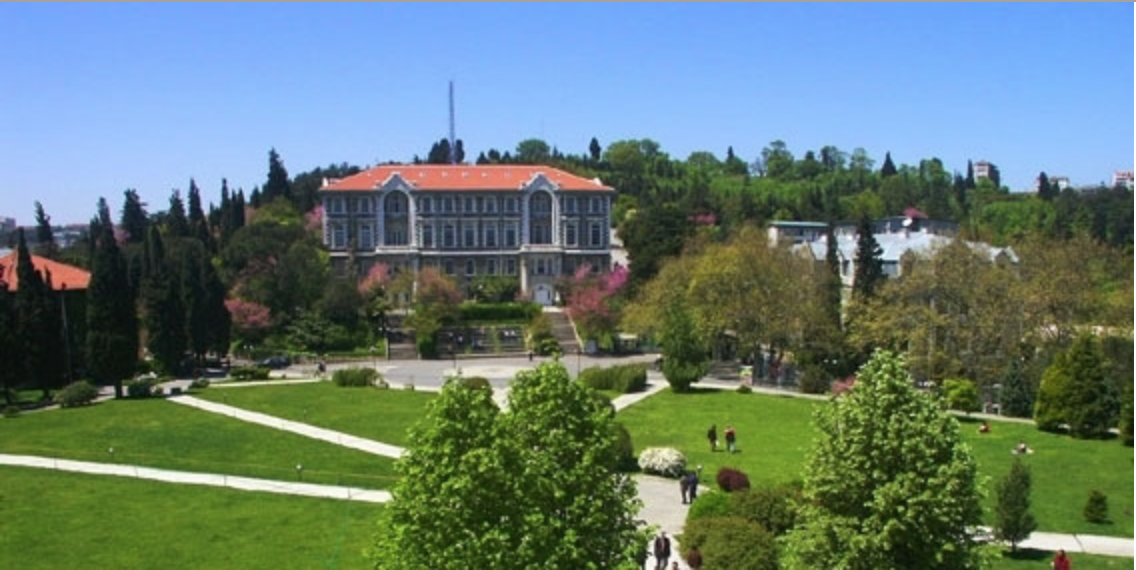
A building on the Boğaziçi University campus

Formerly known as Robert College, the history of the university dates back to 1863, as the first American institution of higher education established outside of the United States. Situated on a hill-top overlooking the Bosporus, the university has a reputation of being one of the most distinguished higher education establishments in Turkey and the Middle East. The University is a member of a network of universities across Europe and the United States with which there is a dynamic student exchange program.

== Participant List ==
- Albania: University of Tirana
- Armenia: Gyumri State Pedagogical Institute, State Engineering University
- Austria: Business University of Vienna, Graz University (Karl-Franzens-Universität), University of Innsbruck, University of Economics and Business
- Belgium: Artesis Hogeschool Antwerpen, Ghent University
- Bosnia: Sarajevo University
- Bulgaria: Academy of Economics, College of Economics and Management, Engineering and Geodesy, European Polytechnical University, Konstantin Preslavsky University of Shumen, National Sports Academy, Plovdiv Agricultural University, Sofia University St ''KLIMENT OHRIDSKI'', Technical University of Sofia, University of Architectura, University of Rousse, University of Shumen, University of Sofia, University of Civil Agriculture, Ufiiski University, Varna Medical University
- Canada: University of Toronto
- Croatia: Faculty of Economics and Business, University of Economics and Business, University of Pula, University of Zagreb, Vern University of Applied Sciences, Zagreb School of Economics and Management
- Cyprus: East Mediterranean University, Girne American University
- Czech Republic: Czech Technical University
- Denmark: Roskilde University
- Estonia: Tallinn Pedagogical University
- Finland: Helsinki School of Economics
- France: Cergy-Pontoise University, Lille University, Essec Graduates, Essec University, Oleons College, Paris Dauphiné University, Sciences Po Paris, St. Etienne School of Management, Université du Littoral, University of St. Denis, University of Paris 8
- Georgia: Black Sea University, Georgia Sports Academy
- Germany: Bremen University Landshut, FAU Erlangen-Nurnberg, HAW Landshut, Hochschule Bonn, Rhein-Sieg, Karlsruhe Institute of Technology, Mannheim University, PH Ludwigsburg, RWTH Aachen, Rheinische Friedrich-Wilhelms-Universitaet Bonn, Technical University of Darmstadt, Trier University, University of Cologne, University of Duisburg-Essen, University of Konstanz, University of Mainz, Technische Universität Braunschweig
- Greece: American College of Thessaloniki, Aristotle University of Thessaloniki, Deree American College of Greece, Ionian University, Technical University of Athens, University of Athens
- Hong Kong: The Hong Kong Institute of Education
- Hungary: Budapest Business School, Central European University, Dote University, Elte University, Eötvös University, Külker College, Technical University of Budapest, University of Foreign Trade
- Italy: Bocconi University, Polytechnic University of Marche
- Iraq: American University of Iraq
- Kazakhstan: KIMEP
- Kosovo: Alessandrio University, Genova University, Pristina University, University of Prishtina, Hasan Prishtina
- Kuwait: American University of Kuwait
- Jordan: Applied Science Private University, University of Jordan
- Lebanon: Antonine University, American University of Beirut, Beirut Arab University, Lebanese American University, Lebanese Youth Sport Union, Notre Dame University, St. Joseph University, The American University of Sat. Tech., University of Balamand, University Saint-Joseph, University Saint-Joseph de Beyrouth, West Mount University
- Lithuania: Kaunas University of Medicine
- Morocco: Al Akhawayn University
- Macedonia: State University of Tetova, Sts. Kiril & Methodus University, University of Goce Delcev
- Netherlands: Hogeschool Zeeland, Inhollan University, University of Amsterdam, University of Groningen, University of Technology Eindhoven, University of Twente, Wageningen University
- Nigeria: Delta State University, Kogi State University
- Oman: Sultan Qaboos University
- Pakistan: Lahore University of Management Sciences, Ned University of Eng. and Tech. Lums
- Poland: Cracow University of Economics, Maria Curie-Skladowska University, Universytet Gdanski
- Portugal: Instituto Superior Tecnico, Polytechnic University of Leiria
- Qatar: Qatar University
- Romania: Academia Nationela Educatie Sport, Anefs Bucharest University, Babes Bolyai University, Babes Cluj Napoca N.A. of Physical & Sport, Medicine University, National Academy of Physical Education & Sports, University of Agronomic Scienced and Veterinary, University of Bucharest, University of Ptesti, University of Severin
- Russia: Asthrakan State University, Institute of International Relation, Mgimo University, Moscow State University, Russian State University, Russian State University of Humanities, Saint Petersburg State University, State University of Management, UFA State Technical Petroleum University, University of South Ural
- Serbia: Faculty of Architecture Belgrade, Faculty of Law, Faculty of Philology, Faculty of Philosophy, Faculty of Political Science, Faculty of Special Education and Rehabilitation, Faculty of Sports and Tourism, Faculty Sports and Physical Education, Faculty of Organizational Sciences, Philology University, Singidunum University, University of Belgrade Faculty of Law
- Sierra Leone: Njala University
- Slovakia: Economic University of Bratislava, University of Zilina
- Spain: University of Granada
- Switzerland: Necuchatel University, St. Gallen University, University of Berne, University of Fribourg, University of Zurich, Zoorich University
- Turkey: Boğaziçi Graduates, Boğaziçi University, Fırat University, Galatasaray University, Hacettepe University, Haliç University, Istanbul Technical University, Istanbul University, Işık University, Kadir Has University, Koç University, Marmara University, Mersin University, Middle East Technical University, Mimar Sinan University, Okan University, Özyeğin University, Sabancı University, Trakya Medical University, Turkish Air Force, Turkish Naval Academy, bartholomew University, Yıldız Technical University, Van University
- UAE: American University in Dubai, Bristol University
- UK: Oxford University, University of Westminster
- Ukraine: Volodymyr Dahl National University
- USA: Adelphi University, American University Select Team, Arkansas State University, Auburn University, Florida State University, Georgia Institute of Technology, Iowa State University, Kansas State University, Kennesaw State University, Midwest University, Sterling College, Union College, University of Augsburg, University of California, University of Central Florida, University of Florida, University of Kentucky, University of Maryland, University of Michigan, Washington State University
