= Mustafa Pultar =

Turkish academic (born 1940)

- Born: March 1, 1940; Istanbul, Turkey
- Citizenship: Turkish
- Education: Robert College (BS); Princeton University (MS, MA, PhD)
- Employer(s): Middle East Technical University; Bilkent University
- Spouse: Gönül Ayda Pultar
- Children: Giray Pultar; Eren Pultar; Selçuk Pultar
- Parents: Yakup Pultar (father); Leyla Kıpçak Pultar (mother)
- Website: www.pultar.org/~mustafa/

Mustafa Pultar is a Turkish academic who is a scholar of building science. He did graduate studies at Princeton University, then taught at Middle East Technical University (METU), and later at Bilkent University where he still teaches one graduate course each semester. A former director of the Building Research Institute of the Scientific and Technological Research Council of Turkey (TÜBİTAK), he was also the founding director of Bilkent University Preparatory School (BUPS). In recent years, he also wrote on the sea.

== Biography ==
=== Education ===
He was born in Istanbul on March 1, 1940, as the second child of Yakup Pultar (1897–1988) and Leyla Kıpçak Pultar (1902–1995), and attended Robert College, graduating as a civil engineer in 1960. He then went to the United States, to Princeton University where, under the supervision of David P. Billington, he obtained two master's degrees, Master of Sciences in Engineering and Master of Arts, and a Ph.D. in 1965.

=== Princeton University ===
He spent another year at Princeton as instructor then returned to Turkey. Pultar's relationship with Billington continued: They co-wrote an article based on a report they had penned together while Pultar was still at Princeton; and Pultar translated Billington's Thin Shell Concrete Structures (1965) into Turkish.

=== Middle East Technical University ===
On his return to Turkey, Pultar taught first at Middle East Technical University, at the Department of Architecture, during the pre-YÖK period of both the department and of METU in the 1960s and 1970s, and, along with his colleague (and under-classmate from Robert College) Mete Turan, introduced novelty to the teaching of architecture (in the instruction of structural systems) in Turkey.

During his years at METU he was appointed associate dean of the Faculty of Architecture and vice-president of the university, and twice elected Dean of the said Faculty. Pultar's contributions during this period consist of, among others, the launching of the bilingual METU Journal of the Faculty of Architecture; the establishment of a doctoral program in the Department of Architecture at METU; the foundation in 1979 of the department of Industrial Design which has been conducting a joint master's program with Delft University since 2008; and of the department Building Science and Environmental Design; the foundation of the Society for Building Science and Environmental Design; and his initiating the publication of the Faculty's newsletter. Bülent Özgüç, today a professor of computer science, reminisces how he was initiated to the subject of computer-aided design in the early 1970s from his then young instructor Mustafa Pultar, who was at the time one of the rare experts of computer-aided design in Turkey.

=== Bilkent University ===
At Bilkent University, which he joined in 1991 after retiring as government employee from METU, Pultar was involved in the graduate program of the Department of Interior Architecture and Environmental Design. his career took on an additional but different path when he was asked to help launch, in this newly created university, a "prep school", Bilkent Laboratory and International School, of international caliber. He then ran the school as founding director for five years. In 2004 Pultar took early retirement from Bilkent University; however, he still teaches an online graduate course there.

=== Writings on the Sea ===
After returning to Istanbul, his birth city, upon his retirement, he has devoted himself to his writings on the sea, which entail not only original studies but also his transcriptions into the Latin alphabet of maritime texts published in the Arabic script during the Ottoman period.

His retirement project is to prepare a comprehensive marine dictionary in Turkish. The first product of this project,Yıldız Adları Sözlüğü (Dictionary of Star Names) appeared in 2007, the second, the transcription from Ottoman of Kamûs-u Bahrî: Deniz Sözlüğü (Marine Dictionary) in 2011 and the third, Deniz Balıkları Sözlüğü (Dictionary of Maritime Fishes) in 2012.

=== Symposium in his Honor ===
A symposium was organized in June 2010 at Kadir Has University in Istanbul, and a Turkish-English bilingual festschrift titled Yapılar Fora: Mustafa Pultar'a Armağan Kitabı / Buildings Ahoy: A Festschrift in Honor of Mustafa Pultar published in his honor on the occasion of his seventy years.

Besides forming and guiding many architecture students at both undergraduate and graduate levels, and advising numerous graduate theses and doctoral dissertations, thus putting his imprint on architecture education in Turkey for the last forty years and more, Pultar has been instrumental during his career in the consolidation of two newly founded universities in the country: from 1967 onwards of METU, established initially as an institute in 1956; and from 1991 onwards of Bilkent, which started accepting students in 1986. However, like many Turkish intellectuals of his generation, his active years were marred by political unrest in the country, which found reflection in academia. Pultar himself, during the thank-you speech he made at the end of the symposium in his honor in June 2010, said he had three regrets, all to do with not having persisted sufficiently, as he now believed, in fighting back the closing down of the following: the Society for Building Science and Environmental Design by the September 12 military regime in 1980; the Department of Building Science and Environmental Design by the YÖK authorities in 1982; and the Building Research Institute by the TÜBITAK Scientific Council in 1989. The first two especially had been projects on which he had spent much effort and energy.

== Bibliography ==
=== Books ===
- Pultar, Mustafa (1965) “Analysis of Continuous Folded Plate Structures.” Unpublished Ph.D. thesis. Princeton University.
- Billington, David P. (1975) Betonarme Kabuk Yapılar. Trans. Hasan Karataş and Mustafa Pultar. İstanbul: İTÜ Mimarlık Fakültesi.
- Pultar, Mustafa, der. (1977) Mimarlıkta İkinci Kademe Eğitimi: Kuram, Araştırma, Uygulama Seminerine Sunulan Bildiriler. Ankara: Çevre ve Mimarlık Bilimleri Derneği.
- Pultar, Mustafa, der. (1978) Mimarlık Bilimi: Kavram ve Sorunları. Ankara: Çevre ve Mimarlık Bilimleri Derneği.
- Pultar, Mustafa, der. (1979) Çevre, Yapı ve Tasarım. Birinci Mimarlık Bilimleri Kongresine Sunulan Bildiriler. Ankara: Çevre ve Mimarlık Bilimleri Derneği.
- Pultar, M. (1983) Yapı, Yapı Araştırması ve Politikası. Ankara: TÜBİTAK Yapı Araştırması Enstitüsü.
- Barkınay, Ahmet Rasim (2005 [1926, 2002]) Adalar Denizi Kılavuzu: Enez'den Marmaris Burnuna Kadar. Latin harflerine transkripsiyon, yay. haz. ve Önsöz: Mustafa Pultar. İstanbul: Denizler Kitabevi.
- Pultar, Mustafa (2007) Yıldız Adları Sözlüğü. İstanbul: Türkiye İş Bankası.
- Pultar, Mustafa (2010) Denizin Dili Denizin Yazısı. İstanbul: Amatör Denizcilik Federasyonu.
- Pultar, Mustafa. Sea Clear II: Amatör Denizciler için Türkçe Seyir Yazılımı Elkitabı.
- Süleyman Nutki (2011 [1917]) Kamûs-u Bahrî. Latin harflerine transkripsiyon, yay. haz. ve Önsöz: Mustafa Pultar. İstanbul: Türkiye İş Bankası.
- Pultar, Mustafa (2012) Deniz Balıkları Sözlüğü. İstanbul: Türkiye İş Bankası.
- Pultar, Mustafa (2022) Denizlük: Büyük Deniz Sözlüğü. İstanbul: Türkiye İş Bankası.
