= L'Industrie Electrique et le Ressource Motrice de la Turquie =

L'Industrie Electrique et le Ressource Motrice de la Turquie is a book by Hasan Halet Işıkpınar first published in 1932. It was originally printed in İstanbul in French language as written by the author. The book mainly focuses on the electrical and petroleum resources of the newly founded Turkish Republic, mainly with the aim of drawing attention to the potential of the country. The findings were later presented to Mustafa Kemal Atatürk, founder of the modern Turkish Republic. Today it is still a widely cited resource for researchers interested in the topic.
