= Tunç =

Tunç is a Turkish name and may refer to:

== Given name ==
- Tunç Başaran (1938–2019), Turkish screenwriter
- Tunç Erem (born 1938), Turkish academic
- Tunç Hamarat (born 1946), Turkish chess player
- Tunch Ilkin (1957-2021), Turkish player of American football and sports broadcaster

== Surname ==
- Ayfer Tunç (born 1964), Turkish writer
- Ferhat Tunc (born 1964), Turkish musician
- Onno Tunç (1948–1996), Turkish-Armenian musician
- Ramazan Tunç (born 1975), Turkish footballer
