= Cansu Canca =

Canadian bioethicist

- Born: Cansu Canca; Turkey

Academic background
- Education: Boğaziçi University (BA and MA); Osaka University; Northeastern University; Harvard Medical School; National University of Singapore (PhD); Harvard Law School

Academic work
- School or tradition: Ethical philosophy
- Institutions: University of Hong Kong; Northeastern University; Harvard Medical School; Harvard Law School; Harvard School of Public Health; World Health Organization; Koç University; The University of Hong Kong
- Main interests: Artificial intelligence Ethics; Justice; Politics; Public health; Medical ethics; global health; population health; health ethics

Cansu Canca (pronunciation: [dʒanˈsu dʒanˈdʒa]) is a moral and political philosopher, with a Ph.D. specializing in applied ethics, and founder and director of AI Ethics Lab. Formerly, she was a bioethicist at the University of Hong Kong, and an ethics researcher at Harvard Law School, Harvard School of Public Health, Harvard Medical School, National University of Singapore, Osaka University, and the World Health Organization.

Canca started AI Ethics Lab in late 2016 (based in Cambridge, MA) focusing on integrating ethics into the innovation process. Developing and implementing the Puzzle-solving in Ethics Model (PiE Model), AI Ethics Lab became a pioneer in the field for its novel approach to ethics practice. In 2018, Canca was listed among the “30 Influential Women Advancing AI in Boston” and in 2019, among the “100 Brilliant Women in AI Ethics”. She is also the first technology and AI ethicist in Turkey.

Canca serves as an ethics expert in various ethics, advisory, and editorial boards. She is a founding editor for AI & Ethics Journal. She has given over 100 keynotes, seminars, talks, and interviews on AI ethics including TEDxCambridge, Harvard Business School, U.S. Department of Justice, Institute of Physics, and MIT Technology Review.

== Selected works ==
- “Operationalizing AI Ethics Principles,” Communications of the ACM, 63 (12): 18–21, 2020, doi:10.1145/3430368
- Toolbox: Dynamics of AI Principles, with K.Y. Usta, O. Kartoz, D. Al-Qutub, AI Ethics Lab, 2020
- “Why ‘Mandatory Privacy-Preserving Digital Contact Tracing’ is the Ethical Measure against COVID-19,” Medium, 2020
- “Artificial Intelligence (AI) and Ethics in Human Subjects Research,” co-authored with T. Eto & B. Leong, CITI Program, 2020
- “AI & Global Governance: Human Rights and AI Ethics – Why Ethics Cannot be Replaced by the UDHR,” United Nations University – Centre for Policy Research, 2019
- “A New Model for AI Ethics in R&D,” Forbes AI, 2019
- “A User-Focused Transdisciplinary Research Agenda for AI-Enabled Health Tech Governance,” co-authored with D. Arney, M. Senges, S. Gerke, L. H. Ihle, N. Kaiser, S. Kakarmath, A. Kupke, A. Gajeele, S. Lynch, L. Melendez, Harvard University Berkman Klein Center for Internet & Society, 2019, doi:10.2139/ssrn.3385398
- “White Christmas and Technological Restraining Orders: Are Digital Blocks Ethical?” co-authored with L. H. Ihle, Black Mirror and Philosophy, ed. W. Irwin & D. K. Johnson, Wiley-Blackwell, 2019.
- “Machine Learning as the Enemy of Science? Not Really.” Bill of Health – Harvard Law School, 2018
- “Voice Assistants, Health, and Ethical Design,” Bill of Health – Harvard Law School, 2017
- “On Coercive Offers: In Support of a Market in Kidneys,” International Journal of Applied Philosophy, 31 (2): 149–162, 2017, doi: 10.5840/ijap201822791
