= Adile Ayda =

Turkish diplomat

- Born: March 7, 1912; Saint Petersburg, Russia
- Died: October 5, 1992 (aged 80)
- Resting place: Zincirlikuyu, İstanbul
- Citizenship: Turkish
- Education: Lycée Notre Dame de Sion Istanbul; Ankara University, Law School
- Spouse: Reşid Mazhar Ayda
- Children: Gönül Pultar, Gülnur Ayda Üçok
- Parent(s): Kamile Rami Arsal, Sadri Maksudi

Adile Ayda (7 March 1912 – 5 October 1992) was the first woman career diplomat of Turkey, but is today better remembered as an Etruscologist. She became interested in Etruscan studies while stationed in Rome as the Minister-Counsellor of the Turkish Embassy, did research on the subject during her stay in Italy and wrote down her findings in a number of books, in Turkish and in French. She proposed that the Etruscans were a Turkic-speaking people, a proposal which never enjoyed wide support and has since been discredited.

Ayda was also known in Turkey as an outspoken parliamentarian during her stint as a member of the Turkish Senate, which she had joined on appointment, as one of the small number of appointed senators, called "kontenjan senatörü" in Turkish, after her retirement from the Turkish Ministry of Foreign Affairs.

Ayda had an eventful professional life. She left the Ministry of Foreign Affairs soon after she joined it, and taught French literature first at the Ankara then Istanbul universities, penned a number of studies as an academic, in Turkish and in French, before returning once again to the Ministry.

== Biography ==
Ayda was born Gadile Sadreyevna Maksudova (Russian: Гадиле Садреевна Максудова, Tatar: Гадилә Садри кызы Максудова, romanized: Ğädilä Sadri qızı Maqsudova) in Saint Petersburg while her father the Tatar Sadri Maksudi was a member of the Duma, serving as a representative of the Ittifaq al-Muslimin party, close Kadets. In 1917, her father became the leader of the first state formation in the Idel-Ural since the territory of the Kazan Khanate was occupied by the Russians in 1552. She left Russia during the famine of the 1920s as a small child, when her mother Kamile, the daughter of the gold-mining Ramiev family of Orenburg, took her and her younger sister Naile across the Russo-Finnish border in a clandestine way. They reunited in Finland with Sadri Maksudov, who himself had left the country dressed as a mujik, after the Bolsheviks had put an end to his government in 1918. The family then spent a year in Germany, where Adile started school; then moved to France where they settled. An invitation by Turkey's founding president Atatürk to her father to come and work in Turkey, and the latter's accepting the invitation, brought about a radical change in Adile's life.

Once in Turkey, Adile became Adile Arsal as her father took on a new surname according to the law. She went on with her education in Istanbul, at a French nuns' school, Lycée Notre Dame de Sion Istanbul, and so continued the French education she had been introduced to in Paris. Raised thus in the French intellectual tradition, Adile became, and remained to the last, a French intellectual at heart. She then attended the law school in Ankara where her father was teaching. She was also a staunch Kemalist throughout her life. Known for her strong personality, she was in fact one of the many formidable women the modernizing efforts of the Turkish Republic would bring to the fore.

Ayda was married twice. Her first marriage, to a physician, was very brief. Her second husband was Reşid Mazhar Ayda (1900–1986), a United States-educated mechanical engineer whom she married in 1942. He was the descendant of an old Ottoman family of Istanbul. The Aydas had two daughters and five grandchildren.

== Works ==
- "L’Influence de Victor Hugo sur Mallarmé." Dialogues. İstanbul, 1953.
- Le Drame Intérieur de Mallarmé ou l'Origine des Symboles Mallarméens. İstanbul: La Turquie Moderne, 1955.
- Un Diplomate Turc Auprès du Roi-Soleil. İstanbul, 1956.
- "Molière et l’Envoyé de la Sublime Porte." Les Divertissements de Cour au XVIIe Siècle. Actes du VIIIe Congrès de l'Association Internationale des Études Françaises, Paris, 3-5 septembre 1956 in Cahiers de l’Association Internationale des Études Françaises, 9 (juin 1957). 103-116.
- Yahya Kemal. Kendi Ağzından Fikirleri ve Sanat Görüşleri. Ankara: Ajanstürk Yayınları, 1962.
- Les Étrusques Étaient-ils des Turcs? Paris: 1971.
- Etrüskler Türk mü idiler? Ankara: Türk Kültürünü Araştırma Enstitüsü Yayınları, 1974.
- Yahya Kemal’in Fikir ve Şiir Dünyası. Ankara: Hisar Yayınları, 1979.
- Böyle İdiler Yaşarken. Ankara: 1984.
- Les Étrusques Étaient des Turcs. Preuves. Ankara: 1985.
- Atsız’dan Adile Ayda’ya Mektuplar (derleme). Ankara: 1988.
- Türklerin İlk Ataları. Ankara: 1987.
- Sadri Maksudi Arsal. Ankara: Kültür Bakanlığı Yayınları Türk Büyükleri Serisi, 1991.
- Etrüskler (Tursakalar) Türk idiler. İlmî Deliller. Ankara: 1992.
- Садри Максуди Арсал. Перевод (Çeviren) В.Б. Феоновой. Москва: 1996.
- Bir Demet Edebiyat. Makaleler. Halil İnalcık’ın önsözü ile. Ankara: Türkiye İş Bankası Kültür Yayınları, 1998.

== See also ==
- List of Turkish diplomats
