= Kemal Kirişci =

Turkish academic

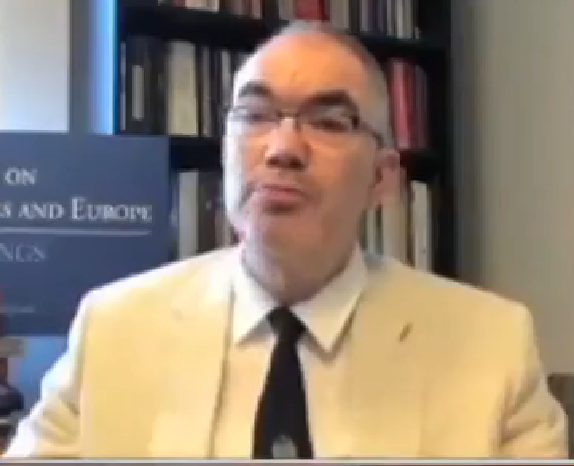

Kemal Kirişci is the TÜSİAD senior fellow and director of the Center on the United States and Europe's Turkey Project at The Brookings Institution, with an expertise in Turkish foreign policy and migration studies. Until recently, he was a professor at the Department of Political Science and International Relations at Boğaziçi University, Istanbul. He holds a Jean Monnet Chair in European Integration and is also the director of the Center for European Studies at the university. He has previously taught at universities in Great Britain, Switzerland, and the United States. Kirişci received his Ph.D. at City University in London in 1986.

== Bibliography ==
=== Books ===
- Kirişci, Kemal; Çarkoğlu, Ali (1998). The political economy of regional cooperation in the Middle East. London New York: Routledge. ISBN 9780415194457.
- Kirişci, Kemal; Rubin, Barry (2001). Turkey in world politics: an emerging multiregional power. Boulder, Colorado: Lynne Rienner Publishers. ISBN 9781555879549.
- Kirişci, Kemal (2018). Turkey and the West : fault lines in a troubled alliance. Washington, DC: Brookings Institution.

=== Articles and chapters ===
- Kirişci, Kemal (2006), "National Identity, Asylum and Immigration: EU as a vehicle of 'post-national' transformation in Turkey", in Kieser, Hans-Lukas (ed.), Turkey beyond nationalism towards post-nationalist identities, London New York New York: I.B. Tauris, pp. 183–199, ISBN 9780857717573.
- Kirişci, Kemal (2006). "A friendlier Schengen visa system as a tool of 'soft power': the experience of Turkey". European Journal of Migration and Law. 7 (4): 343–367. doi:10.1163/157181605776293219.
- Kirişci, Kemal (2006), "The Hague Programme: challenges of Turkish pre-accession in the area of asylum, migration and border control", in de Zwaan, Jaap W.; Goudappel, Flora A.N.J. (eds.), Freedom, security, and justice in the European Union: implementation of the Hague Programme, The Hague: TMC Asser Press, ISBN 9789067042253.
- Kirişci, Kemal; Erzan, Refik (March 2006). "Introduction". Turkish Studies. 7 (1): 1–11. doi:10.1080/14683840500520436. S2CID 219625781.
- Kirişci, Kemal; Erzan, Refik (March 2006). "Conclusion". Turkish Studies. 7 (1): 163–172. doi:10.1080/14683840500520675. S2CID 219627346.
- Kirişci, Kemal (2007), "Turkish asylum policy and human rights", in Kabasakal Arat, Zehra F. (ed.), Human rights in Turkey, Philadelphia: University of Pennsylvania Press, pp. 170–186, ISBN 9780812240009.
- Kirişci, Kemal (March 2007). "Turkey: a country of transition from emigration to immigration". Mediterranean Politics. 12 (1): 91–97. doi:10.1080/13629390601136871. S2CID 155005064.

=== Critical studies and reviews of Kirişci's work ===
Turkey and the West

- Snellen, Jeremy (Summer 2018). "[Untitled book review]". Book Reviews. Naval War College Review. 71 (3): 163–164.
