= Osman Kavala =

Turkish businessperson and philanthropist

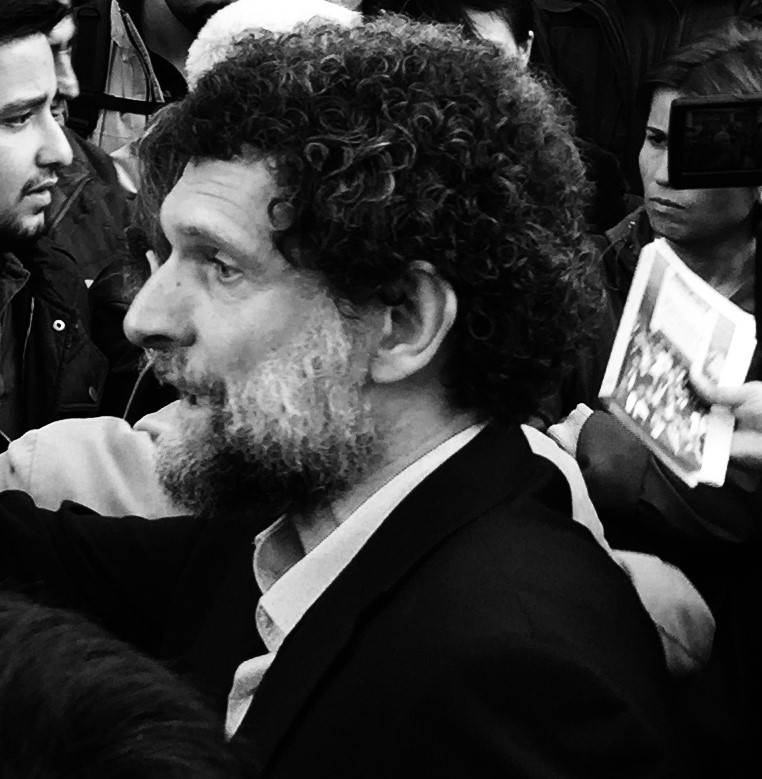
- Osman Kavala at the Armenian genocide centennial commemoration near Taksim Square, Istanbul (2015)
- Born: 2 October 1957 (age 69); Paris, France
- Citizenship: Turkey
- Education: Robert College
- Alma mater: Middle East Technical University; University of Manchester; The New School for Social Research
- Organization: Anadolu Kültür
- Known for: Philanthropy
- Spouse: Ayşe Buğra (m. 1988)

Mehmet Osman Kavala (born 2 October 1957) is a Turkish economist, businessman, philanthropist, and political activist. Kavala is the founder and chair of the board of Anadolu Kültür, an Istanbul-based nonprofit arts and culture organization. In 2019, he received the European Archaeological Heritage Prize from the European Association of Archaeologists for his efforts to protect and preserve significant examples of cultural heritage in danger in Turkey and the Ayşenur Zarakolu Freedom of Thought and Expression Award by Human Rights Association's Istanbul branch. His arrests in Turkey caused the European Court of Human Rights and ambassadors from ten Western countries to demand his release. These demands were rejected by Turkish courts and president Erdoğan.

On 25 April 2022, a court sentenced him to life in prison due to his alleged relations with the Gülen movement and the Gezi park protests. Foreign policy analyst Steven A. Cook has described the allegations as false and ridiculous. In October 2023, Kavala was awarded the Václav Havel Human Rights Prize, and in 2025 the Goethe Medal.

== Early life and education ==
Kavala comes from a family of tobacco traders. His family moved from Northern Greece to Turkey in the 1923 population exchange between Greece and Turkey. Kavala was born in Paris in 1957 He attended Robert College in Istanbul. Kavala studied management at the Middle East Technical University in Ankara and economics at the University of Manchester in the United Kingdom, subsequently enrolling in PhD program at The New School for Social Research in New York City but returning to Istanbul upon his father's death in 1982. After his father's death, he took over the family-owned enterprise Kavala Companies.

== Publishing activities ==
Starting with the early 1980s, Kavala has contributed to the establishment of several publishing companies in Turkey. Following the 1980 Turkish coup d'état, in 1983, he co-founded the publishing house İletişim Yayınları. In 1985, he co-founded Ana Publishing with Nazar Büyüm and Selahattin Beyazıt, which published AnaBritannica (the Turkish version of Encyclopædia Britannica), Britannica Compton's, and Temel Britannica. Kavala is currently a member of the board of directors at Aras Publishing.

In the acknowledgements of his 2018 book Talaat Pasha: Father of Modern Turkey, Architect of Genocide, historian Hans-Lukas Kieser thanks Kavala for his support.

== Civil society activities ==
Since the 1990s, Kavala has contributed to numerous civil society organizations in Turkey. In 1984, he co-founded BILSAK (Science Art Culture Services Society), which promoted discussions around gender and ecology. He contributed to the establishment of several NGOs that started in the 1990s. These include TEMA (Turkish Foundation for Combating Soil Erosion for Reforestation and the Protection of Natural Habitats), Helsinki Citizens' Assembly, and Center for Democracy and Reconciliation in Southeast Europe. He has been part of the board of directors of Turkish Foundation of Cinema and Audio-visual Culture (TÜRSAK), Turkish Economic and Social Studies Foundation (TESEV), Association for the Protection of Cultural Heritage (KMKD), Truth Justice Memory Center, and History Foundation of Turkey. Kavala is also known to be a sponsor of Amnesty International. He actively participated in the development of Spaces of Culture, a project set out to promote and support cultural activities İzmir, Diyarbakır and Gaziantep. The project is initiated by Goethe-Institut, the Consulate General of Sweden in Istanbul, the Embassy of the Netherlands and the Institut francais de Turquie, in cooperation with Anadolu Kültür and Istanbul Foundation for Culture and Arts (IKSV).

Since 2002, he has spent much time working for the charitable foundation Anadolu Kültür, of which he is the founder and current chair. Anadolu Kültür runs cultural centers in underdeveloped regions of Turkey and fosters cultural cooperation with countries in the Caucasus and Balkan regions as well as those in the European Union. The organization supports local, regional, and international collaborations in arts and culture, and promotes for the protection and preservation of cultural heritage. Its vision is to contribute to a pluralist and democratic society. Its initiatives include Diyarbakır Arts Center (2002–ongoing), Kars Arts Center (2005–2009), and Depo in Istanbul—hosting exhibitions, talks, screenings, and workshops.

Kavala was a founding member of the Open Society Foundations in Turkey, an international grantmaking network created by the American-Hungarian billionaire George Soros. In 2018, the foundation ceased all its activities in Turkey. In a conversation with journalist Şirin Payzın, Kavala said that he "respected Soros" and that "our views overlap on issues such as the proper functioning of legal institutions, the protection and extension of civil rights, the support of civil society organizations and rights defenders, and immigration policies." He added that his "views on egalitarian policies in the social and economic fields are different" and that he has been critical of some of the activities of the Foundation in some countries. President Recep Tayyip Erdogan singled Kavala out for criticism, saying "The connections of the person they call the ‘red Soros of Turkey’ are coming to light", and accused Kavala of being responsible for the Gezi Park protests of 2013, and of the "transfer of significant funds to certain places". In an op-ed published in The New York Times, Kavala states: "It seems I was cast in this narrative because I was a board member of the Open Society Foundation in Turkey and because of my open—though not financial—support of the campaign to protect Gezi Park.

=== Peace talks between PKK and Turkish Government ===
In 2013, Prime Minister Recep Tayyip Erdoğan initiated the peace talks to end armed conflict between Turkey and the PKK. As part of the peace process, members of BDP went to İmralı island to convey messages between both parties (Erdogan and Abdullah Öcalan). Daily Milliyet got hold of the minutes of the meeting (İmralı Zabıtları) and published a story about it. In these minutes, the name of Kavala came up. According to the minutes published by Milliyet, the following line was uttered by BDP's Sırrı Süreyya Önder: "Sir [Öcalan], we have discussed everything. There is also the issue of presidency. It is a delicate matter among the public. Osman Kavala sends his regards to you. They are worried that the presidential system will change into a totalitarian system." The power and involvement of Kavala as a third party in this decades-long conflict between the state and PKK was met with suspicion by some commentators.

== Arrest and court case ==
On 18 October 2017 Osman Kavala was detained at the Istanbul Atatürk Airport after his visit to Gaziantep for a joint project with Goethe Institute. On 25 October 2017, the newspaper Daily Sabah, close to the Erdoğan government, accused him of being a "business tycoon with a shady background" and having contacts with the "Gülenist Terror Group" (FETÖ).

On 1 November 2017, Kavala was arrested on both Article 309 and Article 312 of the Turkish Penal Code. Article 309 ("attempts to abolish, replace or prevent the implementation of, through force and violence, the constitutional order of the republic of Turkey") was related to an investigation on the 2016 Turkish coup d'état attempt, and Article 312 ("the use of force and violence, to abolish the government of the Republic of Turkey or to prevent it, in part or in full, from fulfilling its duties") was related to an investigation on Gezi Park protests.

Related to Article 312 or the Gezi Park Trial as it is referred to in the press, a criminal indictment seeking life imprisonment for Kavala and 15 other people, including journalist Can Dündar and actor Memet Ali Alabora, was accepted on 4 March 2019 by the Istanbul 30th Heavy Penal Court. The indictment accuses the defendants of forming the mastermind behind the scenes of the Gezi Park protests, which is characterized as an "attempt to overthrow the government through violence" in this document. The indictment also alleges that philanthropist George Soros was behind the conspiracy. The trial was to begin on the 24 June 2019. The verdict in the so-called Gezi Trial was only delivered on the 18 February 2020, when Kavala was acquitted.

On 18 February 2020, hours after his acquittal on Article 312, the chief prosecutor of Istanbul demanded the continued detention of Kavala due to Article 309, although Istanbul prosecutor's office had ordered him released on a pre-trial release judgment on Article 309 on 11 October 2019. On 19 February 2020, he was arrested once again for Article 309. He was acquitted from Article 309 on 20 March 2020.

On 9 March 2020, Kavala was arrested on Article 328 ("securing information that, due to its nature, must be kept confidential for reasons relating to the security or domestic or foreign political interests of the State, for the purpose of political or military espionage"). This arrest happened only one day before the ruling of the European Court of Human Rights about Kavala's pretrial detention demanding his release became final on 10 March.

Osman Kavala has been in Silivri Prison since 1 November 2017. After the court ruling on 20 March he has been arrested 3 times, and acquitted 2 times from the same crime related to Article 309.

=== International reaction ===
French politician Daniel Cohn-Bendit, in a public letter to Osman Kavala on 29 March 2018, wrote, "I try to understand the reason behind your arrest, but I cannot apprehend it. (...) It is difficult to conceive the reason behind it. (...) I am convinced that democracy will triumph, and we will soon be able to toast to our common future by the Bosporus. I am waiting for you in Frankfurt".

European Court of Human Rights about Kavala's pretrial detention became final on 10 March. This ruling stated that there was no sufficient evidence to support the accusations against Kavala and that "the prosecution’s attitude could be considered such as to confirm the applicant’s assertion that the measures taken against him pursued an ulterior purpose, namely to reduce him to silence as an NGO activist and human-rights defender, to dissuade other persons from engaging in such activities and to paralyse civil society in the country." It also requested that the Turkish Government "take every measure to put an end to the applicant’s detention and to secure his immediate release."

Human Rights Watch Executive Director Kenneth Roth stated that "The immediate re-arrest of Osman Kavala in another bogus investigation after his acquittal on trumped-up charges for the Gezi Park protests shows how Turkey’s criminal justice system is politically manipulated, with detention and prosecutions pursued at the political whim of the president."

After the decision released by the Council of Europe Committee of Ministers’ on 3 September 2020, the International Commission of Jurists (ICJ), Human Rights Watch, and the Turkey Human Rights Litigation Support Project demanded that Turkish authorities release Kavala immediately. In September 2021, the Committee of Ministers of the Council of Europe gave Turkey until December 2021 to release Kavala before beginning infringement proceedings against Turkey. On 3 December 2021 Council of Europe (COE) says it will notify Turkey of its intention to launch "infringement proceedings" against the country over its failure to release philanthropist Osman Kavala.

On 23 October 2021, the demand for Kavala's release was supported by ten embassies (Canada, Denmark, Finland, France, Germany, the Netherlands, New Zealand, Norway, Sweden, and United States), whose ambassadors were subsequently declared "persona non grata" in a statement by president Erdoğan. On 25 October, Erdogan backtracked on his initial threats to expel the ten ambassadors, stating that the diplomats had fulfilled their commitment to Article 41 of the Vienna Convention and that they would "be more careful in their statements."

British human rights activist and journalist, William Nicholas Gomes wrote to President Recep Tayyip Erdoğan to immediately and unconditionally release Osman Kavala. William Nicholas Gomes had sent this request via the Turkish Embassy in London, United Kingdom.

Amnesty International named Kavala a prisoner of conscience in 2022. On August 2026 it was reported by the BBC that the European rights court had ordered Turkey to release him.

== Personal life ==
Kavala married Ayşe Buğra in 1988. Buğra is professor of political economy at the Atatürk Institute of Modern Turkish History of Boğaziçi University in Istanbul.

== See also ==
- History of the Republic of Turkey#AKP government (2002–present)
