= Faruq Ziada =

Iraqi diplomat

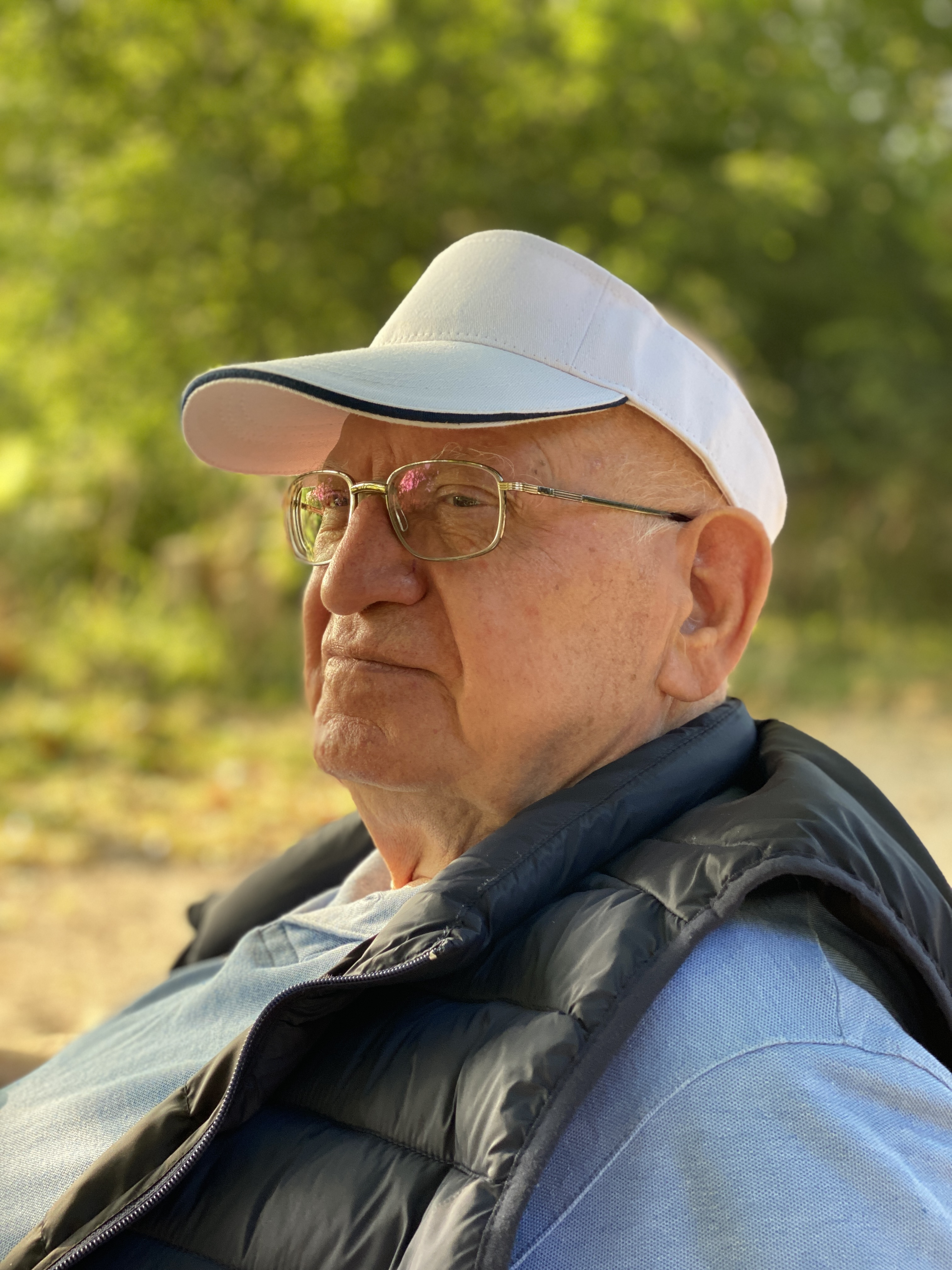
Faruq Ziada 2021

Faruq Ahmed Saad al-Din Ziada (Arabic: فاروق أحمد سعد الدين زيادة; November 2, 1937 – June 16, 2024) was an Iraqi diplomat.

== Career ==
He served as vice-chair of the General Assembly's Second Committee (Economic and Financial) in 1983.

== Works ==
In December 2006 he wrote an article titled "Is There a Sunni Majority in Iraq?" for the political magazine CounterPunch.

In a July 2008 feature for Al Jazeera English, Ziada described post-invasion Iraq as a "war-torn nation" and lamented the destruction of its infrastructure and society.

He also contributed analysis to the Washington Report on Middle East Affairs, including the article "The Mines Bush Planted in Iraq Could Derail Obama's Policies and Strategy There" (November 2008), which criticised U.S. policy in Iraq.

Ziada also participated in the 2016 "Iraq Commission" People's Tribunal, where he gave testimony on the deception that led to the Iraq War.

Regional Arabic media also highlighted his views. In December 2017, the Jordanian news outlet Jo24 quoted Ziada on the UN General Assembly's Jerusalem resolution, describing it as binding on member states. The Lebanese newspaper Al-Binaa also published an op-ed by Ziada on the same issue.
