= Tamer Önder =

Turkish stem cell scientist

Tamer Önder (born November 12, 1980, in Istanbul) is a professor at Koç University, specializing in molecular biology and genetics. His work primarily focuses on stem cell biology and cancer.

== Early life and education ==
Önder graduated from Robert College in 1998. He completed his undergraduate degree in Molecular Biology and Genetics at Cornell University.

From 2002 to 2008, Önder pursued his Ph.D. at the Massachusetts Institute of Technology (MIT), under the guidance of Prof. Robert Weinberg. His thesis work was centered on cancer metastasis and cancer stem cells.

After completing his Ph.D., Önder joined Harvard Medical School for his postdoctoral studies under Prof. George Daley, focusing on stem cells, specifically somatic cell reprogramming and induced pluripotent stem cells.

== Career ==
In June 2012, Önder was appointed as a faculty member at Koç University School of Medicine. His research interests include the molecular mechanisms of stem cell formation and the generation of patient-specific stem cells.

== Publications and citations ==
Önder has authored several articles and holds patents in the field of molecular biology. His work has been published in journals such as PNAS, Cell, and Nature. His research has received over 5,000 citations.

He is also a full member of the Science Academy Society of Turkey.
