= Ayşe Buğra =

Turkish academic (born 1951)

Ayşe Buğra (born 1951) is a Turkish social scientist, currently professor of political Economy at the Atatürk Institute for Modern Turkish History and the co-founder of the Social Policy Forum of Boğaziçi University in Istanbul. She is a recipient of the TWAS Prize for Social Sciences which she received in 2014.

== Biography ==
After graduating from Robert College of Istanbul, Buğra continued her education at Boğaziçi University. With a PhD in economics from McGill University, Canada, she has written on the history and methodology of economics, development economics, and comparative social policy. In addition to various publications in Turkish, English, and French, she is the translator into Turkish of The Great Transformation by Karl Polanyi.

Buğra is married to Osman Kavala, a Turkish businessman.

== Selected works ==
- New Capitalism in Turkey: The Relationship Between Politics, Religion and Business (with Osman Savaşkan,(2014).
- Sınıftan Sınıfa (with Taylan Acar, Esin Ertürk, Özgür Burçak Gürsoy, Ebru Işıklı, Aysun Kıran and Sevecen Tunç, (2010).
- Reading Karl Polanyi for the 21st Century: Market Economy as Political Project (co-edited with Kaan Agartan, 2009).
- Vatandaşlık Gelirine Doğru (co-edited with Çağlar Keyder, 2007).
- Sosyal Politika Yazıları (co-edited with Çağlar Keyder, 2006).
- Devlet-Piyasa Karşıtlığının Ötesinde: İhtiyaçlar ve Tüketim Üzerine Yazılar (Beyond the State-Market Dichotomy: Essays on Human Needs and Consumption, 2000).
- Islam in Economic Organizations (1999).
- State, Market, and Organizational Form (co-edited with Behlül Üsdiken, 1997).
- State and Business in Modern Turkey: A Comparative Study (1994).
- İktisatçılar ve İnsanlar (On Economists and Human Behavior, 1989).
