= Caleb Frank Gates =

American historian

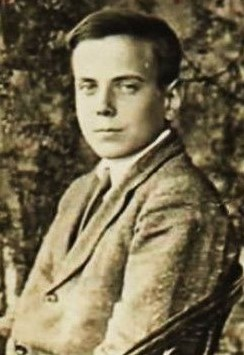
- Gates in 1917

Chancellor of the University of Denver
- In office March 1941 – November 1943
- In office February 1946 – August 1947

Personal details
- Born: December 24, 1903 Constantinople
- Died: December 21, 1955 (aged 51) Santa Rosa, California
- Education: Princeton University; Balliol College

Caleb Frank Gates (December 24, 1903 – December 21, 1955) was an American historian who served as chancellor of the University of Denver.

== Early life and education ==
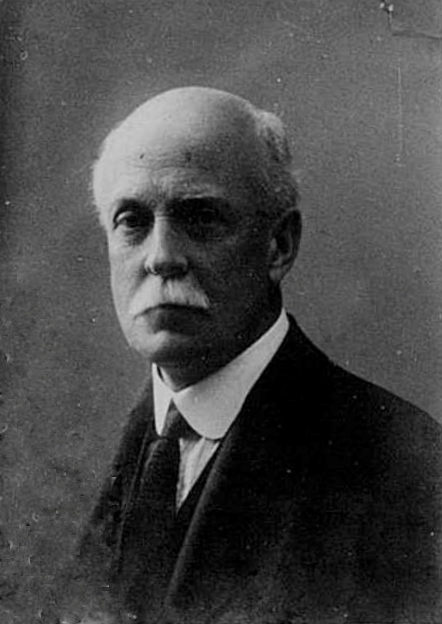
Gates's father, Gates Sr., in 1916.

Gates was born in Constantinople (now Istanbul), and received his early education at Robert College in Istanbul, where his father (Caleb Frank Gates, 1857–1946) served as president. Gates came to the United States in 1919 and attended The Hill School in Pottstown, Pennsylvania for three years. In 1926, he graduated with honors from Princeton University and continued his studies under a Rhodes scholarship at Balliol College in Oxford. In 1928, while attending college, Gates married Elizabeth Farnum in England. They raised four children: Caleb Jr., Betsy Ann, Mary Ellen, and Gwynne. The couple returned to Turkey after Gates graduated from Balliol College with both B. A. and M. A. degrees.

He taught history and served as headmaster of the preparatory school at Robert College from 1932 to 1933. Gates returned to Princeton for a year of graduate work in history and was eventually appointed history instructor at Princeton. He also served as assistant dean for three years until 1939, when the dean of the college became incapacitated and the full responsibility of the office rested with Gates.

== Chancellor of the University of Denver ==
In 1941, Gates accepted the position of chancellor at the University of Denver. At the age of 37, he was the youngest chancellor in the university's history. In 1943, Gates took a leave of absence from the university to join the army during World War II, with the rank of major. He was stationed first in England with the American Military Government and then as an attaché to the American ambassador in Belgrade, Yugoslavia. His duties included handling prisoners of war and displaced persons.

Gates served two terms as chancellor of the University of Denver, from 1941 to 1943 and 1946 to 1947. Under his leadership, enrollments rose by 57 percent compared to the pre-war enrollments of 1939, and the number of veterans on campus rose to 60 percent. He presided over the creation of the university's School of Hotel and Restaurant Management, School of Architecture and Planning, and School of Aeronautics. Gates resigned as chancellor in 1947, but remained for two years as professor of history. He joined numerous organizations, including the University Club of Denver, Denver Press Club, American Alpine Club, Princeton Club, American Historical Society, Colorado Education Society, and the Foreign Policy Association. His papers at the University of Denver cover his years as chancellor.

== Personal life and death ==
Gates and his first wife divorced in 1954. In 1955, he married Mable Ridge and relocated to Santa Rosa, California, to operate the Cedar Shake Guest Lodge. He died there of a heart attack, on December 21, 1955.
