= Mihriban Pekgüleryüz =

Turkish and Canadian metallurgist

Mihriban Özden Pekgüleryüz (born 1951) is a Turkish and Canadian metallurgist known for her development of light metal alloys with advanced properties, and especially for magnesium alloys and applications of these alloys in high-temperature environments such as internal combustion engines. She is a professor in the Department of Mining and Material Engineering at McGill University.

Pekgüleryüz graduated from the American College for Girls of Robert College in Istanbul in 1971. She has bachelor's and master's degrees from the University of Florida, and a Ph.D. from McGill University. She has worked for Noranda Mines, as a Rio Tinto Alcan research chairholder at the Université du Québec à Chicoutimi, and as a General Motors Canada research chairholder at McGill University. She is a Fellow of the Canadian Academy of Engineering, elected in 2015.
