= Gönül Pultar =

Turkish scholar (born 1943)

Fahriye Gönül Pultar
- Born: November 3, 1943; Istanbul, Turkey
- Citizenship: Turkish
- Education: Robert College (BA); Middle East Technical University (PhD)
- Spouse: Mustafa Pultar
- Children: Giray Pultar; Eren Pultar; Selçuk Pultar
- Parents: Reşid Mazhar Ayda (father); Adile Ayda (mother)
- Website: www.pultar.org/~gonul/

Fahriye Gönül Pultar (née Ayda, born 3 November 1943) is a Turkish academic, scholar and novelist. Presently, she is the President of the Cultural Studies Association of Turkey and also holds the honorary title of the President of the World League of Tatars.

== Biography ==
She was born on 3 November 1943 in Istanbul.

=== Education ===
Following her career diplomat mother, Adile Ayda, she studied in such countries as France, the Netherlands and the former Yugoslavia and received a B.A. from Robert College (now Boğaziçi University) in Istanbul and a Ph.D. from Middle East Technical University (METU) in Ankara.

=== Career ===
After an early career in journalism, she opted for academia and has taught at METU, Boğaziçi University, Bilkent University as well as Bahçeşehir University. In 1998, she was appointed as a research fellow at the Longfellow Institute of Harvard University. She has been active in various academic associations such as the Modern Language Association, the American Studies Association and the Society for Multi-Ethnic Studies Europe and the Americas.

In 1999, Pultar founded the "Group for Cultural Studies in Turkey," which later became the Cultural Studies Association of Turkey of which she has been president since. She is at present a member of the Editorial Advisory Board of Journal of Popular Culture.

Being the granddaughter of Sadri Maksudi (1878-1957), the leader of the short-lived "Turco-Tatar national-cultural autonomy" established right after the 1917 Revolution in Russia, she has found herself immersed in the life and culture of the autonomous republics of Tatarstan and Bashkortostan (within the Russian Federation) after the fall of the Soviet Union.

=== Awards ===
In 1965, she received the Robert College Cinema Club Award for her movie script “Bağbozumu (Vintage)” and in 1970, the Hachette-Larousse Literature Award in France for her essay “Lettre à un Ami.” For her efforts at promoting the Tatar culture in the diaspora, she was awarded a medal in 2005 by President Vladimir Putin of Russia and in 2007 a "Rehmet Hattı" (English: Testimony of Gratitude) by the then President Shaimiev of Tatarstan.

In 2014, a festschrift was published in her honor, entitled A Transcultural Wanderer: A Festschrift for Gönül Pultar.

== Works ==
=== Literary studies ===
Pultar's studies in academia have been in literary studies, mainly in the area of English/American Literature. She was the founding editor of Journal of American Studies of Turkey and also the guest editor of the September 2006 issue of Comparative American Studies, a special issue devoted to American literature in languages other than English. Her written works in this area include Technique and Tradition in Samuel Beckett's Trilogy of Novels and On the Road to Baghdad or Traveling Biculturalism: Theorizing a Bicultural Approach to Contemporary World Fiction.

=== Cultural studies ===
Originating primarily from biennial international symposia on various cultural issues which she initiated under the auspices of the Cultural Studies Association of Turkey, her written works include Kültür ve Modernite (Culture and Modernity), Türk(iye) Kültürleri (Cultures of Turks/Turkey), İslam ve Modernite (Islam and Modernity), Kimlikler Lütfen: Türkiye Cumhuriyeti'nde Kültürel Kimlik Arayışı ve Temsili (IDs Please: Quest for and Representation of Cultural Identity in the Republic of Turkey), Imagined Identities: De/Construction of Culture, Ethnicity and Trans/Nationhood in the Age of Globalization. Her essay "Postmodern Resistance or Public Mask: The Islamic Veil in Europe" appeared in Post-National Enquiries: Essays on Ethnic and Racial Border Crossings (2009) edited by Jopi Nyman.

=== Central Asian studies ===
Through her involvement with the World League of Tatars, she has produced the following books: Yirmi Birinci Yüzyılda İdil-Ural (Idil-Ural in the Twenty-first Century), and Ağır Gökyüzünde Kanat Çırpmak: Sovyet-sonrası Türk Cumhuriyetlerinde Kültürel Kimlik Arayışı ve Müzakeresi (Flapping Wings in Heavy Skies: Quest and Debate for Cultural Identity in Post-Soviet Turkic Republics)

=== Creative writings ===
- Dünya Bir Atlıkarınca (The World is a Merry-go-round). Novel, 1979.
- Ellerimden Su İçsinler (Let Them Drink Water from My Hands). Novel, 1999.

Her short story "Leda and the Swan," published in Cultural Horizons (2001) can be found at the web site entitled "Contemporary Turkish Literature" of Boğaziçi University.

=== Other works ===
- Kardeşim Yaralısın: Fakir Baykurt'u Anmak (Brother, You're Wounded: In Memoriam Fakir Baykurt).
- Kardeşliğe Bin Selam: İlhan Başgöz ile Söyleşi (A Thousand Greetings to Brothers All: An Interview with Ilhan Başgöz).
- Yapılar Fora: Mustafa Pultar'a Armağan Kitabı (Buildings Ahoy: A Festschrift in Honor of Mustafa Pultar).

In addition to the books above, she has written numerous encyclopedia articles and essays in books and journals published in the US, The Netherlands, Germany, The Russian Federation, Japan, India, and Turkey.

== See also ==
- Turkish women in academics
