= Gülay Barbarosoğlu =

Turkish industrial engineer and academic administrator

Rector of Boğaziçi University
- In office 2012–2016
- Preceded by: Kadri Özçaldıran
- Succeeded by: Mehmed Özkan

Personal details
- Education: Boğaziçi University (BS, PhD)
- Occupation: Industrial engineer, academic administrator

Gülay Doğu Barbarosoğlu is a Turkish industrial engineer and academic administrator who served as the rector of Boğaziçi University.

== Education ==
Barbarosoğlu graduated from Robert College in 1974. She earned a bachelor's degree (1978) and a PhD (1985) in industrial engineering at Boğaziçi University.

== Career ==
In 2000, Barbarosoğlu was promoted to full professor of industrial engineering at Boğaziçi University. She taught courses in mathematical optimization, logistics, operations, and decision-making. Barbarosoğlu was vice rector of research in Boğaziçi from 2008 to 2012. From 2012 to 2016, she served as rector of Boğaziçi University.

Barbarosoğlu retired from academia in 2016. She was succeeded by Mehmed Özkan.
