= Semih Tezcan =

Turkish academic (born 1932)

Semih Tezcan (sah-MEEH TEZ-jahn; born May 3, 1932) is a Turkish academic. He graduated from Istanbul Technical University Faculty of Civil engineering in 1954. In 1962, he went to Canada, and joined University of British Columbia as an assistant professor.

Tezcan became associate professor in 1964, and Professor in 1966 at UBC. He received the Gzowski Gold Medal, Best Civil Engineering Paper Award from Engineering Institute of Canada. He was the founding president of the Turkish Canadian Society from 1963 to 1968.

He became the second president of Boğaziçi University, succeeding the first president Aptullah Kuran (former American Robert College in Istanbul), where he served between 1979 and 1982. Tezcan was the President of YÖK (Yükseköğretim Kurulu) between 1980 and 1981. In addition to his academic career in Boğaziçi University, Tezcan is currently the President of Higher Education and Research Foundation, and the President of Türkiye Deprem Vakfı (TDV). Tezcan has also served many years as the Honorary Consul-General of Indonesia in Istanbul from August 1985 to February 2008.

Semih Tezcan has been married to Özlem Tezcan since August 15, 1984, and they have two sons.
