= Cemal Kafadar =

Turkish academic and historian (born 1954)

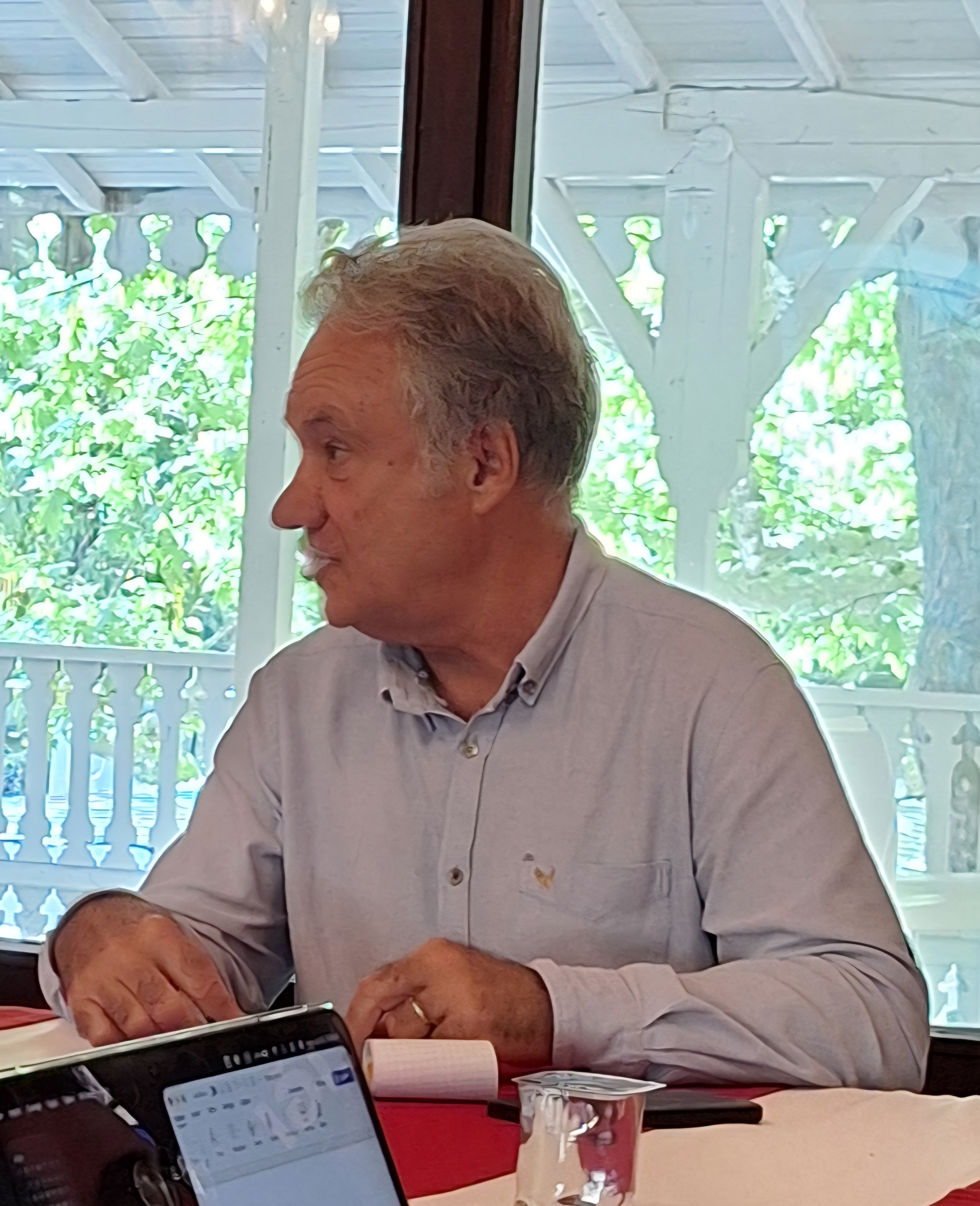
- Professor Cemal Kafadar at the Yalova Ottoman Studies Summer School (2026)
- Born: August 15, 1954 (age 71); Istanbul, Turkey
- Education: Hamilton College (BA); McGill University (MA, PhD)
- Spouse: Gülru Necipoğlu
- Awards: Presidential Culture and Arts Grand Awards (2010)
- Scientific career
- Fields: History of the Ottoman Empire
- Institutions: Harvard University; Princeton University
- Website: history.fas.harvard.edu/people/cemal-kafadar

Cemal Kafadar (born 15 August 1954) is a Turkish scholar and historian. He is a Professor of History, the Vehbi Koç Professor of Turkish Studies in the Department of History, and the director of the Center of Middle Eastern Studies at Harvard University (CMES).

Kafadar graduated from Robert College, then Hamilton College, and received his PhD from the McGill University Institute of Islamic Studies in 1987 and taught for two years in Princeton's Near Eastern Studies department before going to Harvard. Kafadar teaches seminars related to popular culture, hagiography and Ottoman historiography as well as the early modern history of the Middle East and Balkans. He is a member of the editorial board of the Historians of the Ottoman Empire and was a member of the jury of the Antalya Golden Orange Film Festival in 2009. He is an honorary member of the Turkish Historical Society.

== Works ==
Kafadar's work focuses on the social and cultural history of the Middle East and Southeastern Europe during the late medieval and early modern periods. Focusing on a vast variety of topics, Kafar wrote about the Ottoman history, urban space, travel, popular culture, and the intersection of history and cinema. In his graduate research, he concentrated on the relations between Janissaries and tradesmen as well as Janissary rebellions, challenging dominant narratives such as the progressive-reactionary dichotomy. Influnced by writers like Kemal Tahir, he criticized the Marxist school of historiography and it's approach to the research of Ottoman society. He is the author of one book in English (The Construction of the Ottoman State (1995)). and two in Turkish (Kim Var İmiş Biz Burada Yoğ İken Dört Osmanlı: Yeniçeri, Tüccar, Derviş ve Hatun (2009) and Kendine Ait Bir Roma Diyar-ı Rum'da Kültürel Coğrafya ve Kimlik Üzerine (2021))

== Activities ==
Cemal Kafadar often appears on historical programs in Turkey and abroad, where he comments on the history of the Ottoman Empire and aspects of daily life during the Ottoman period. In 2026, he was one of the founders of the Yalova Ottoman Summer School, a program designed to help doctoral students from Turkey and abroad improve their knowledge of the Ottoman language.

In March 2025, during what the Crimson described as "a mounting pressure campaign by the Trump administration" and concerns about CMES' "programming on Israel and Palestine", Harvard dismissed Kafadar as director of CMES, effective at the end of the academic year.

== Selected publications ==
- Kafadar, Cemal (1989). "Self and others: the diary of a dervish in seventeenth century Istanbul and first-person narratives in Ottoman literature". Studia Islamica. 69 (69): 121–150. doi:10.2307/1596070. JSTOR 1596070.
- Kafadar, Cemal (1991). "On the purity and corruption of the janissaries". Turkish Studies Association Bulletin. 15 (2): 273–280. JSTOR 43385269.
- İnalcık, Halil; Kafadar, Cemal, eds. (1993). Sülaymân the Second and His Time. Istanbul: Isis Press. ISBN 978-975-428-052-4.
- Kafadar, Cemal (1995). Between Two Worlds: The Construction of the Ottoman State. Berkeley, CA: University of California Press. ISBN 978-0-520-20600-7.
- Kafadar, Cemal (1999). "The question of Ottoman decline". Harvard Middle East and Islamic Review. 4 (1–2): 30–75.
- Kafadar, Cemal (2009). Kim Var İmiş Biz Burada Yoğ İken Dört Osmanlı: Yeniçeri, Tüccar, Derviş ve Hatun (in Turkish). Istanbul: Metis. ISBN 978-975-342-706-7.
- Gülru Necipoğlu, Cemal Kafadar, and Cornell Fleischer, eds. (2019). Treasures of Knowledge. An Inventory of the Ottoman Palace Library (1502/3–1503/4). 2 vols. Leiden: Brill.
- Kafadar, Cemal (2021). Kendine Ait Bir Roma Diyar-ı Rum'da Kültürel Coğrafya ve Kimlik Üzerine (in Turkish). Istanbul: Metis. ISBN 978-605-316-088-5.
