= Nevra Necipoğlu =

Turkish historian

- Occupation: Professor of History at Boğaziçi University

Academic background
- Education: Robert College
- Alma mater: Wellesley College (BA); Harvard University (MA, PhD)

Academic work
- Discipline: Byzantine history

Nevra Necipoğlu is a Turkish historian of the Byzantine Empire who is a professor of history at Boğaziçi University.

== Early life and education ==
She was educated and graduated from Robert College. She then graduated from Wellesley College with a double major in History and Economics in 1982. She received her Ph.D. in Byzantine History from Harvard University in 1990. She is the sister of Gülru Necipoğlu, who is the Aga Khan Professor of Islamic Art and director of the Aga Khan Program for Islamic Architecture at Harvard University.

== Career ==
She has taught at Boğaziçi University since 1990 and is the founding director of its Byzantine Studies Research Center, which was established in 2015. She has taught courses on Classical History and Civilization, Islamic History and Civilization, Byzantine Constantinople, the Crusades, pre-Ottoman Turkish history, as well as Byzantine History and Historiography.

She has published Byzantium between the Ottomans and the Latins: Politics and Society in the Late Empire (2009) and edited Byzantine Constantinople: Monuments, Topography and Everyday Life, (with Ayla Ödekan and Engin Akyürek) The Byzantine Court: Source of Power and Culture, and (with Paul Magdalino)Trade in the Byzantine World

Her research interests include Late Byzantine social and economic history; Byzantine–Ottoman relations; the social topography of late Byzantine Constantinople; and the history of medieval Anatolia.

== Languages ==
Necipoğlu's native language is Turkish and she is fluent in English. She also can do research in French, German, Ancient & Byzantine Greek, Latin, Ottoman Turkish and Italian. She also has palaeographic skills in Byzantine Greek, Ottoman Turkish, Medieval Latin and Italian.

== Awards and honors ==
- 1986–1987 Dumbarton Oaks Junior Fellowship in Byzantine Studies
- 1993–1994 Dumbarton Oaks Fellowship in Byzantine Studies
- 1995 Martin Harrison Memorial Fellowship, University of Oxford
- 2002 Visiting Scholar, Centre de recherches d’histoire et civilisation Byzantines et du Proche Orient médiéval, Université Paris 1 Panthéon-Sorbonne
- 2008 Boğaziçi University Award for Outstanding Research
- 2010 Runciman Award Shortlist

== Videos ==
- Türkiye'de Bizans araştırmaları üzerine Prof. Nevra Necipoğlu ve Prof. Engin Akyürek ile sohbet (A Conversation with Professors Nevra Necipoğlu and Engin Akyürek on Byzantine Research in Turkey (in Turkish)
- Byzantine Studies Research Center Inauguration at Boğaziçi University, November 24, 2015

== Bibliography ==
=== Books (author) ===
- Byzantium between the Ottomans and the Latins: Politics and Society in the Late Empire (Cambridge: Cambridge University Press, 2009). [Turkish translation forthcoming from Türkiye İş Bankası Kültür Yayınları in 2016]

=== Books (editor) ===
- Byzantine Constantinople: Monuments, Topography and Everyday Life, The Medieval Mediterranean vol. 33 (Leiden-Boston-Köln: E. J. Brill, 2001). [Turkish translation forthcoming from Yapı Kredi Yayınları in 2016].
- (With Ayla Ödekan and Engin Akyürek) The Byzantine Court: Source of Power and Culture. Papers from the Second International Sevgi Gönül Byzantine Studies Symposium, Istanbul, 21–23 June 2010 (Istanbul: Koç University Press, 2013).
- (With Paul Magdalino) Trade in Byzantium: Papers from the Third International Sevgi Gönül Byzantine Studies Symposium (Istanbul : Koç University Research Center for Anatolian Civilizations, 2016).
