= Hasan Halet Işıkpınar =

Turkish-American professor/electrical engineer

Hasan Halet Işıkpınar (1897–1977) is a Turkish engineer and professor. He initially graduated from Robert College as an electrical engineer in 1916, being the first Turkish graduate of the engineering department. He advanced his studies to receive a degree of mechanical engineering from the same institution in 1922. After his assistantship in Robert College from 1923 to 1925, he attended Massachusetts Institute of Technology until 1928 and graduated as the first Turkish student of the university. He kept his tenure as a professor in Robert College in the department of engineering until 1934, where he contributed to the advancement of the department of electrical engineering to a significant extent. He led over 800 engineering projects in Turkey, majority of which being the first examples within the newly founded Turkish Republic. He was fluent in multiple languages including English, French, German and Italian, with his most notable works including widely sourced engineering books in these languages, including "L'Industrie Electrique et les Ressources Motrices de la Turquie", in which he stressed the importance of Turkey as a petroleum resource. He later presented his findings on the topic to Mustafa Kemal Atatürk.

He is the son of Mehmet Halit Taspinar, a government officer with civilian Pasha rank equal to Ferik in the government of Abdul Hamid II, best known for passing critical government correspondence to Mustafa Kemal Atatürk during the Turkish War of Independence to support Kuva-yi Milliye.
