= Korhan Taviloğlu =

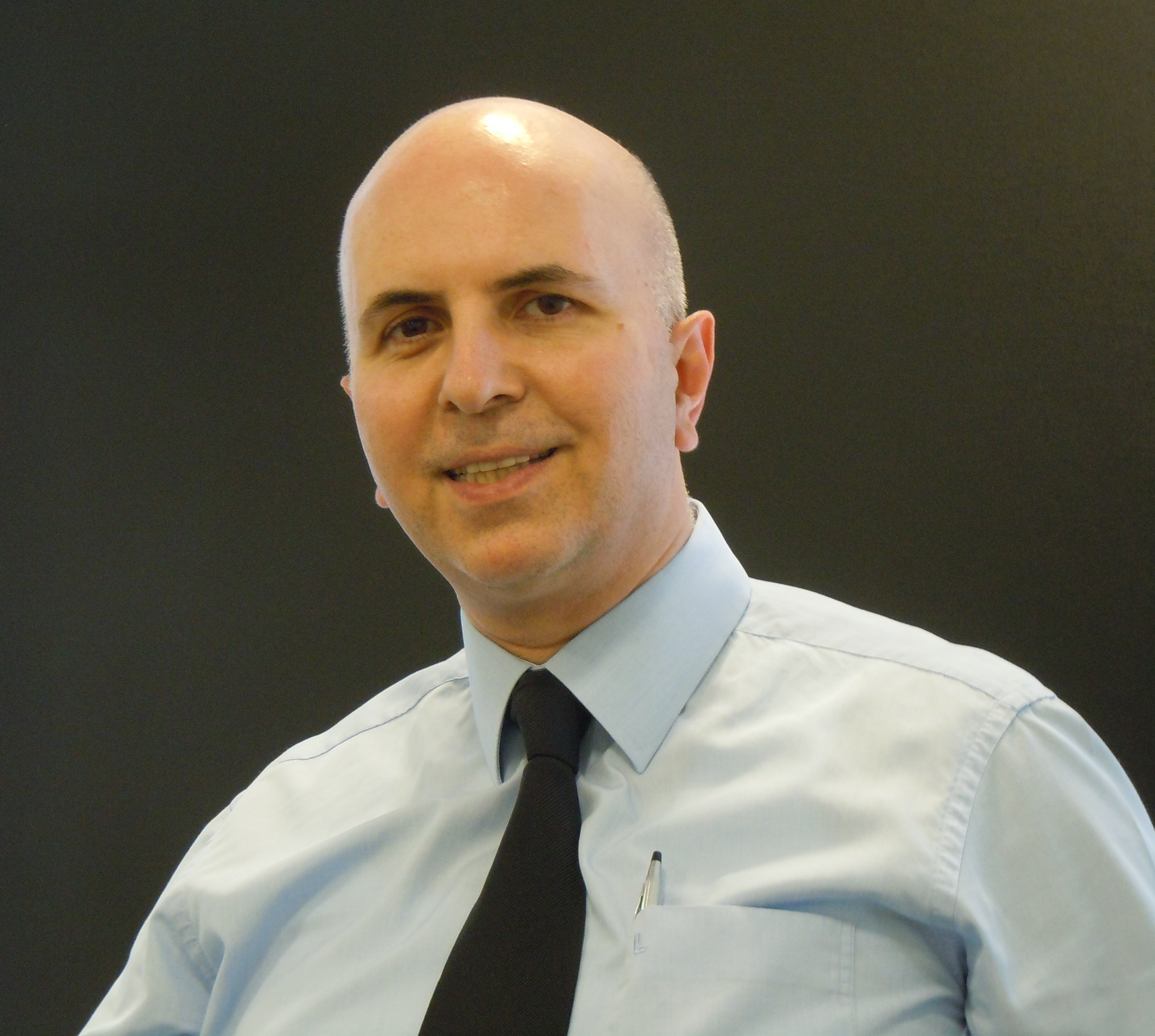

Personal details
- Born: 1962 (age 63–64) Istanbul, Turkey
- Education: Istanbul University, Istanbul School of Medicine, Istanbul, Turkey
- Profession: Professor of General Surgery
- Website: www.taviloglu.com

Korhan Taviloglu (born 1962 in Istanbul), Professor of General Surgery

== Education ==
Graduated from Robert College in 1980 and from Istanbul University, Istanbul School of Medicine in 1986 and fulfilled General Surgery residency at Istanbul University, Istanbul School of Medicine, Department of Surgery in 1991.

== Outstanding activities ==
Appointed as the General Secretary of the European Society for Trauma and Emergency Surgery (ESTES) between 2002 and 2011, President Elect between 2011–2012 and President of ESTES for the term 2012–2013. He was the first surgeon from Turkey to hold this position in Europe.

== Medical education ==
He fulfilled General Surgery residency at Istanbul University, Istanbul School of Medicine, Department of Surgery in 1991. He worked at Baylor College of Medicine between 1992 and 1993. He was appointed Associate Professor of Surgery at Istanbul University, Istanbul School of Medicine, Department of Surgery in 1996 and Professor of surgery in 2002. He worked at Acibadem Healthcare Group between 2003 and 2008 and Florence Nightingale Health Group between 2008 and 2012. He works in his private clinic since 2012. He acts in the editorial board of 40 Medical journals, more than 20 of which are international. He was trained for advanced laparoscopic surgery, robotic surgery and laser surgery. His main fields are: General Surgery, colorectal surgery, proctology and cancer surgery.
