= Aptullah Kuran =

Architect scholar

Aptullah Kuran (4 December 1927 – 1 April 2002) was a Turkish historian of architecture and professor of Ottoman architecture, as well as the founding president of Boğaziçi University. After graduation from Robert College, he received his bachelor's and master's degrees in architecture at Yale University and his doctoral degree in history of art at Ankara University. In 1957, he joined the Faculty of Architecture at the Middle East Technical University as a faculty member. Between 1962 and 1968, he served as the dean of the METU Faculty of Architecture. He returned to Robert College in 1968, and became the first president of Boğaziçi University when Robert Yüksek was converted into a public university by Turkish authorities in 1971.

Aptullah Kuran is also the father of Duke University professor Timur Kuran, Suzan Kuran, and Melisa Kuran Fowler.

== Selected publications ==
- İlk Devir Osmanlı Mimarisinde Cami (1964) (English: Mosques in Early Ottoman Architecture)
- Anadolu Medreseleri I (1969) (English: Anatolian Madrasahs I)
- Anatolian-Seljuk Architecture (1980)
- Mimar Sinan (1986)
- Sinan, The Grand Old Master of Ottoman Architecture (1987)
