= Tunç Erem =

Turkish academic

- Born: 1938 (age 87–88); Istanbul, Turkey

Academic background
- Education: Robert College; Roosevelt University

Academic work
- Discipline: Business theory Social science
- Sub-discipline: International marketing International trade Strategic management
- Institutions: Marmara University

Tunç Erem (born 1938) is a Turkish academic in international marketing, international trade and strategic management who was rector of Marmara University from June 2002 to July 2006.

== Youth and education ==
Erem was born in Istanbul in 1938. After finishing Robert College High School in Istanbul, he graduated from the college of Business Administration of Roosevelt University, Chicago, Illinois in the United States in 1962 with a BS degree. He received his doctorate from the Istanbul Academy of Economic and Commercial Sciences in 1968.

== Research, teaching and administration ==
Erem was awarded the title of associate professor in 1971, and in 1977 a full professorship at the Istanbul Academy of Economic and Commercial Sciences.

Erem's research interests include international marketing, strategic management and international trade. He has represented Turkey at various international conferences pertinent to these research interests, and is the author of numerous articles published in international or national journals or conference proceedings. Erem has also written three books on marketing management.

From 1977 to 1978, Erem was dean of the College of Business Administration of the Istanbul Academy of Economic and Commercial Sciences. Between 1999 and 2002, Erem was the dean of the Faculty of Economics and Administrative Sciences of Marmara University. He was elected rector by the teaching faculty of the university in June 2002 and remained in office until July 2006 following the election of a successor by the university faculty.

Erem is listed as a member of the Board of Trustees of the American Turkish Friendship Council.
