= Boğaziçi University =

Public research university in Turkey

Coordinates: 41.083556°N 29.050598°E

- Boğaziçi Üniversitesi
- Former names: Robert College (1863–1971)
- Motto: Yarından Sonrası İçin
- Motto in English: "For the Day After Tomorrow"
- Type: Public research university
- Established: 1863; 163 years ago
- Founders: Cyrus Hamlin; Christopher Robert
- Affiliations: UNIMED; Utrecht Network; McDonnell International Scholars Academy; NeurotechEU
- Rector: Mehmet Naci İnci
- Academic staff: 1,183
- Administrative staff: 798
- Total staff: 2,756
- Students: 16,500+
- Location: Istanbul, Turkey
- Campus: 7 campuses
- Language: English
- Colors: Blue; Navy blue
- Nickname: Boğaziçi Sultans (American football)
- Website: bogazici.edu.tr/en

Boğaziçi University is a public research university in Istanbul, Turkey. Its main campus in Bebek is located just west of the Bosphorus, from which the institution takes its name. It is historically linked to Robert College, the first American college founded outside the United States. Robert College's university section became Boğaziçi University, a Turkish public university, in 1971. All instruction is in English. The university has six faculties, eight institutes and a school of foreign languages, spread across seven campuses.

== History ==
Robert College was founded in Bebek in 1863 by Christopher Robert, an American philanthropist, and Cyrus Hamlin, a Congregational missionary. In 1869, the first campus (now the Boğaziçi South Campus) was built on the ridge near Rumelihisarı with permission from Sultan Abdülaziz.

According to a college catalog compiled for the 1878–1879 academic year, "the object of the College is to give to its students, without distinction of race or religion, a thorough education equal in all respects to that obtained at a first-class American college and based upon the same general principles."

After Cyrus Hamlin, the college was administered by George Washburn (1877–1903) and Caleb Gates (1903–1932). The college was established independent of the American Board of Commissioners for Foreign Missions (ABCFM), though with a significant number of missionaries among its faculty in its early years, and adopted an entirely secular and non-denominational educational model in 1923 in compliance with the new republican principles of Turkey.

Before 1971, Robert College had junior high school, high school, and university sections under the names Robert Academy, Robert College, and Robert College Yüksek Kısım. In 1971, the Bebek campus and academic staff of Robert College were turned over to the Republic of Turkey to form a public university named Boğaziçi University, the renamed continuation of Robert College's university section (i.e. Robert College Yüksek Kısım). The rest of Robert College moved into the Arnavutköy campus of the American College for Girls; despite continuing to call itself a college, it became merely a high school.

On 10 September 1971, as part of this transformation, Robert College bequeathed its Bebek campus—today's Boğaziçi South Campus—comprising 118 acres (48 ha), along with its buildings, library, laboratories, facilities, personnel, and students, to the Turkish government. Boğaziçi University was subsequently established as a Turkish public university. Since then, the university has gradually evolved from a small liberal arts college into a research university.

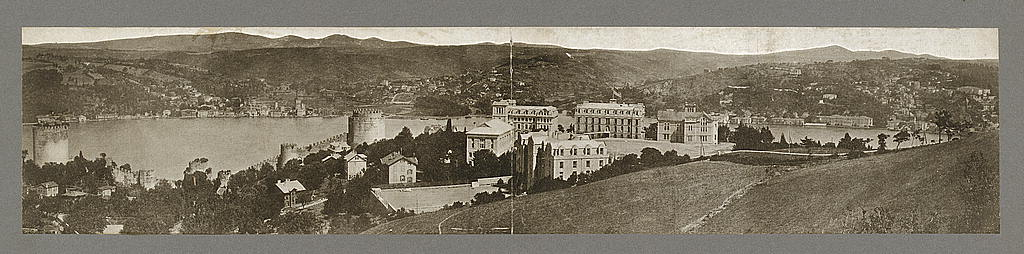
Robert College, c. 1880–1910

== Governance ==
The rector serves as the university's chief officer, presiding over both the University Senate and the University Executive Council. The Senate is the principal academic body and is responsible for decisions on curriculum, research policy, and academic standards; it is composed of vice rectors, deans, directors of institutes and schools, and members elected by the faculties. The University Executive Council oversees administrative and budgetary matters and comprises the deans and members elected by the Senate. Each faculty, school, and institute also maintains its own executive council and academic board.

At its inception in 1971, Boğaziçi University inherited a culture of participatory governance from Robert College. The first rector, Aptullah Kuran, was appointed by the Ministry of National Education, but faculty councils met regularly and played a significant role in institutional decision-making. Deans were elected by their faculties.

=== Rector selection ===
Following the 1980 Turkish coup d'état, the newly established Council of Higher Education assumed the authority to appoint rectors at all Turkish universities, including Boğaziçi. In 1992, as part of the post-coup political normalization, Boğaziçi's faculty proposed an advisory election system. Under this model, faculty members voted for rector candidates, and the three receiving the most votes were forwarded to the Council of Higher Education, which selected one name—typically the top vote-getter—for formal appointment by the President of Turkey. Boğaziçi faculty also developed an informal convention whereby candidates who had not received the highest vote would withdraw from consideration if selected over the leading candidate. This system remained in place until 2016.

In 2016, the President departed from the advisory election outcome and appointed Mehmed Özkan, the deputy of the former elected rector, rather than the candidate who had received the majority of the faculty vote. Özkan subsequently received a vote of confidence from the faculty. On 2 January 2021, President Erdoğan appointed Melih Bulu as rector without holding a faculty advisory vote, exercising the authority granted to the presidency by the Council of Higher Education Law. The appointment prompted protests by faculty, students, and alumni, during which more than 150 students were detained by police. The protests received international media coverage, and over a thousand academics, including Noam Chomsky, David Harvey, and Judith Butler, signed a statement of support for the university community.

Bulu was dismissed on 15 July 2021, and Mehmet Naci İnci was appointed as his successor. According to reports by Bianet and Diken, the administration under the government-appointed rectors initiated disciplinary investigations against faculty members and restricted some student club activities.

== Campuses and student life ==
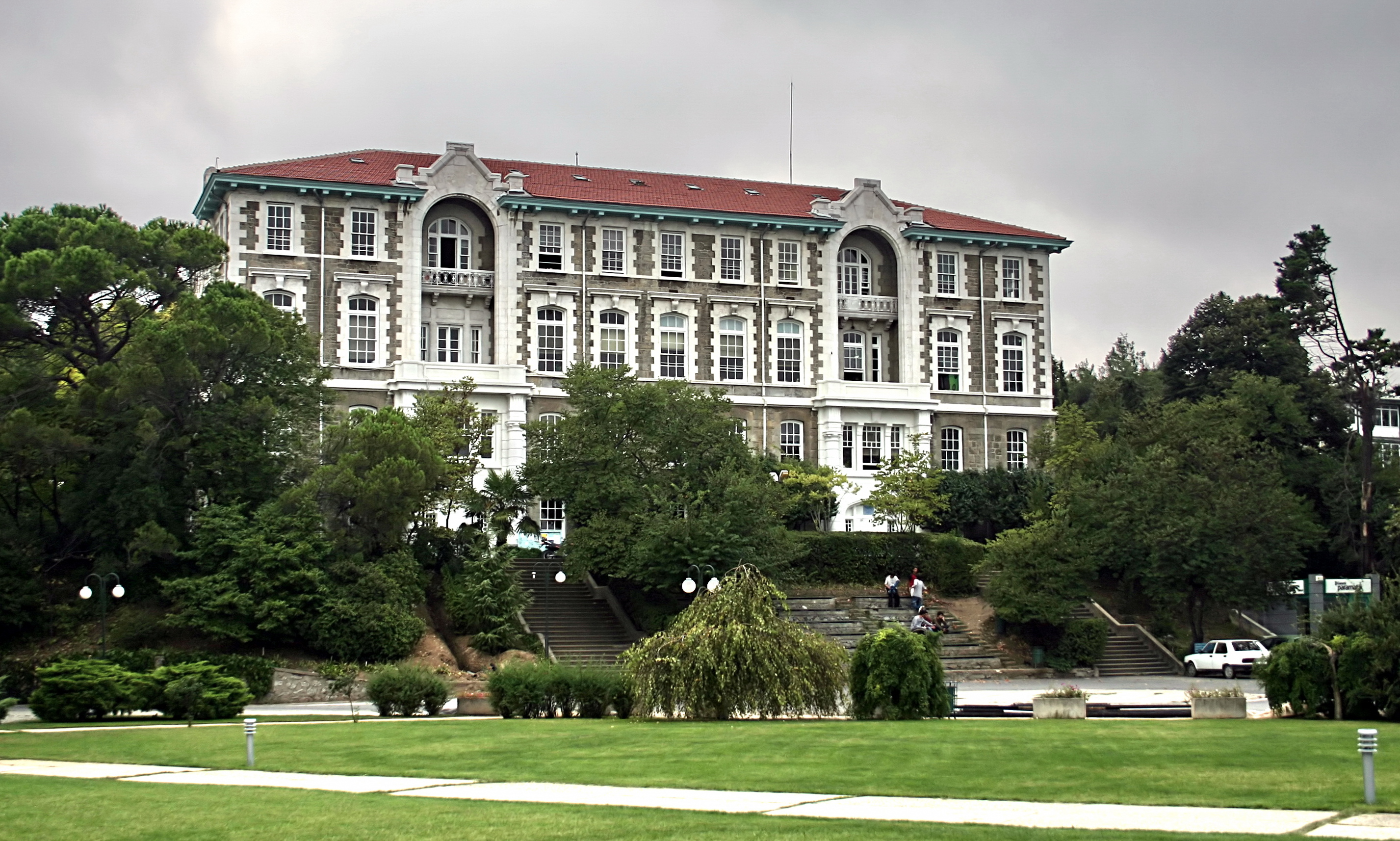
Anderson Hall

Boğaziçi University operates across seven campuses in and around Istanbul, each serving distinct academic or residential functions.

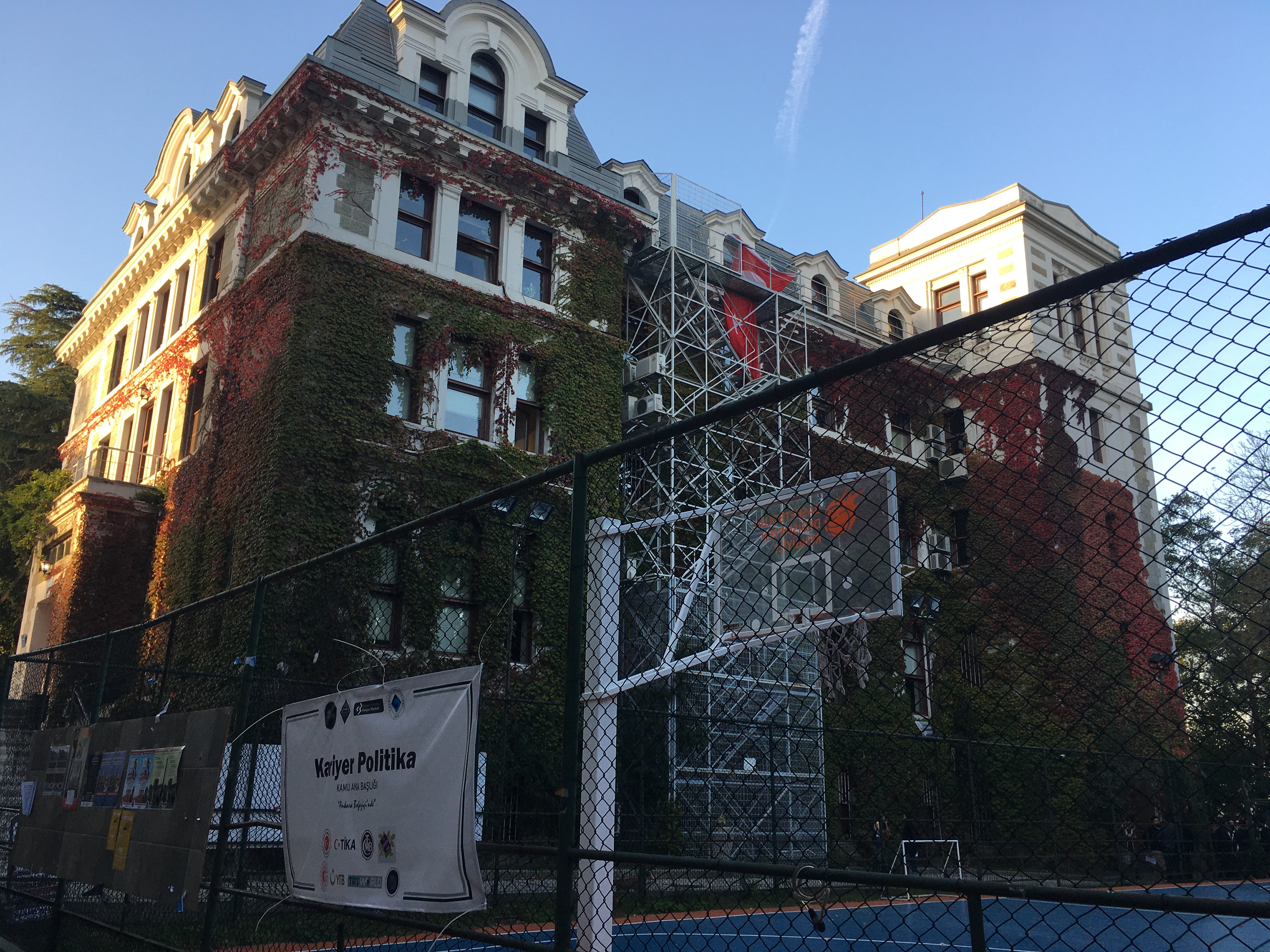
Washburn Hall

The South Campus in Bebek is the oldest and most historically significant site, retaining several buildings from the Robert College era—among them Hamlin Hall, Theodorus Hall, Dodge Hall, Albert Long Hall, and Kennedy Lodge. It functions as the university's main academic and administrative hub. Washburn Hall houses the Faculty of Economics and Administrative Sciences, Anderson Hall the Faculty of Science, Perkins Hall the Faculty of Engineering, and Sloane Hall the Psychology and Sociology departments. The Institute for Data Science and Artificial Intelligence and the Natuk Birkan Building are also located here.

The North Campus is oriented toward science and engineering, accommodating the Faculty of Education, the Educational Technologies Building, the Computer Engineering building, and the Sciences and Engineering Building. It was previously home to the Aptullah Kuran Library.

The Uçaksavar Campus provides recreational and cultural facilities, including a stadium, gymnasium, the Lifelong Learning Center (BUYEM), and the Garanti Cultural Center.

The Hisar Campus hosts the Institute of Environmental Sciences alongside more than 20 classrooms, three amphitheaters, a cafeteria, an indoor pool, and a gym.

The Kilyos Sarıtepe Campus sits on the Black Sea coast and primarily serves as a residential site, with student dormitories and a private beach. It is notable for being the world's first energy self-sufficient university campus, generating all of its electricity from an on-site wind power plant.

The Anadolu Hisarı Campus accommodates the School of Foreign Languages Preparatory Unit, along with dining, sports, and dormitory facilities.

The Kandilli Campus is home to the Kandilli Observatory and Earthquake Research Institute and the Institute of Biomedical Engineering.

=== Student dormitories ===
Student dormitories
Dormitory name	Campus
Theodorus Hall Dormitory	South Campus
1st Kuzey Dormitory	North Campus
3rd Kuzey Dormitory	North Campus
4th Kuzey Dormitory	North Campus
Kandilli Dormitory	Kandilli Campus
1st Kilyos Dormitory	Kilyos Sarıtepe Campus

=== Music and sports festivals ===
The Taşoda Music Festival is held every spring by the university's Music Club and is named after the club's studio on the South Campus.

Every May the Boğaziçi Sports Festival is held at the South Campus and other university venues, with more than 1,000 student athletes from over ten countries competing in twelve sports.

== Academics ==
All undergraduate and graduate instruction at Boğaziçi University is conducted in English, a tradition inherited from Robert College and maintained continuously since 1863. Incoming students who do not demonstrate sufficient English proficiency are required to complete the university's English Preparatory Program before beginning their degree studies.

=== International rankings ===
In the 2027 QS World University Rankings, Boğaziçi placed 345th globally while ranking 88th worldwide in the QS Employer Reputation indicator—one of only three Turkish universities in the global top 100 in that category, alongside Middle East Technical University (77th) and Istanbul Technical University (91st). In QS subject rankings, it placed 217th in Social Sciences & Management and 236th in Engineering & Technology. The 2026 Times Higher Education World University Rankings placed it in the 401–500 band.

=== Research ===
Boğaziçi hosts several dedicated research institutes, including the Kandilli Observatory and Earthquake Research Institute, the Institute of Biomedical Engineering, the Institute of Environmental Sciences, and the Institute for Data Science and Artificial Intelligence. It is a founding member of NeurotechEU, a European University alliance focused on neuroscience and technology. Boğaziçi is also one of nine Turkish universities to have endorsed the European Charter for Researchers and the Code of Conduct for the Recruitment of Researchers.

== Organization ==
=== Faculties ===
==== Faculty of Economics and Administrative Sciences ====
- Economics
- Management
- Political Science and International Relations
- International Trade
- Management Information Systems
- Tourism Administration

==== Faculty of Education ====
- Computer Education and Educational Technology
- Educational Sciences
- Foreign Language Education
- Primary Education
- Mathematics and Science Education

==== Faculty of Engineering ====
- Chemical Engineering
- Civil Engineering
- Computer Engineering
- Electrical and Electronics Engineering
- Industrial Engineering
- Mechanical Engineering

==== Faculty of Humanities and Social Sciences ====
- History
- Linguistics
- Philosophy
- Psychology
- Sociology
- Translation and Interpreting Studies
- Turkish Language and Literature
- Western Languages and Literatures

==== Faculty of Science ====
- Chemistry
- Mathematics
- Molecular Biology and Genetics
- Physics

=== Institutes ===
Boğaziçi University has eight institutes.

=== Schools ===
==== School of Foreign Languages ====
- Advanced English Unit
- English Preparatory Unit
- Modern Languages Unit

=== Units under the Rectorate ===
- Department of Physical Education and Sports
- Department of Fine Arts
- Turkish Language Courses Coordination Unit

== Student clubs ==
Boğaziçi University has the following student clubs.

Student clubs
Abbreviation	Name	Established
ADK	Atatürkist Thought Club; Atatürkçü Düşünce Kulübü	—
BİSAK	Islamic Studies Club; İslam Araştırmaları Kulübü	2013
BRİÇ	Bridge Club; Briç Kulübü	1983
BUBK	Science Club; Bilim Kulübü	1983
BUCEK	Environment Club; Çevre Kulübü	—
BUDS	Debate Society; Münazara Kulübü	1998
BUGUSTO	Gastronomy and Degustation Club; Gastronomi ve Degustasyon Kulübü	2012
BULING	Linguistics Society; Dilbilim Topluluğu	2020
BUKOMİK	Caricature and Humor Club; Karikatür ve Mizah Kulübü	2004
BUSAS	Underwater Sports Club; Sualtı Sporları Kulübü	1983
BUSOS	Social Work Club; Sosyal Hizmet Kulübü	—
BUSUİK	Political Science and International Relations Club; Siyasal Bilimler ve Uluslararası İlişkiler Kulübü	—
BUTİK	Historical Studies Club; Tarih İncelemeleri Kulübü	—
BUOK	Game Club; Oyun Kulübü	—
BÜÇEV	Translation Club; Çeviri Kulübü	1999
BÜDAK	Mountaineering Club; Dağcılık Kulübü	1974
BÜDANS	Dance Club; Dans Kulübü	1992
BÜDAV	Behavioral Sciences Club; Davranış Bilimleri Kulübü	—
BÜED	Literature Club; Edebiyat Kulübü	—
BÜFK	Folklore Club; Folklor Kulübü	1958
BÜFOK	Photography Club; Fotoğrafçılık Kulübü	1929
BÜHAK	Aviation Club; Havacılık Kulübü	1983
BÜKAK	Women's Studies Club; Kadın Araştırmaları Kulübü	2000
BÜLGBTİA+	LGBTI+ Studies Club; LGBTİ+ Çalışmaları Kulübü	2014
BÜMAK	Caving Club; Mağara Araştırmaları Kulübü	1973
BÜMK	Music Club; Müzik Kulübü	1974
BÜMATEK	Mechanical Technology Club; Makine ve Teknoloji Kulübü	—
BÜO	Theater Club; Tiyatro Kulübü	1923
BÜTAK	Turcology Club; Türk Araştırmaları Kulübü	2015
BÜTMK	Turkish Music Club; Türk Müziği Kulübü	—
BÜ(S)K	Cinema Club; Sinema Kulübü	1962
BÜSOT	Sociology Society; Sosyoloji Topluluğu	2023
BÜYELKEN	Seamanship and Sailing Club; Denizcilik ve Yelken Kulübü	2000
EREC	Education and Research Club; Eğitim ve Araştırma Kulübü	—
ESN	Erasmus Student Network; Uluslararası Öğrenci Ağı	1989
GSK	Fine Arts Club; Güzel Sanatlar Kulübü	1982
KÖY-KOOP	Village and Cooperatism Club; Köy ve Kooperatifçilik Kulübü	1976
RADYO	Radio Boğaziçi; Radyo Boğaziçi	1992
SATRANÇ	Chess Club; Satranç Kulübü	—
SBK	Social Sciences Club; Sosyal Bilimler Kulübü	—
SK	Sports Committee; Spor Kurulu	1898
BUEC	Electrotechnology Club; Elektroteknoloji Kulübü	1962
BUİK	Business and Economics Club; İşletme ve Ekonomi Kulübü	1953
BÜYAP	Construction Club; Yapı Kulübü	1987
BÜYAK	Operations Research Club; Yöneylem Araştırma Kulübü	1982
COMPEC	IT Club; Bilişim Kulübü	1994
ENSO	Engineering Society; Mühendislik Kulübü	1914

== Presidents and rectors ==
- Cyrus Hamlin (1863–1877), American Congregational missionary
- George Washburn (1877–1903), American philosopher
- Caleb Frank Gates (1903–1932), American historian
- Paul Monroe (1932–1935), American educator
- Walter Livingston Wright (1935–1943), American educator
- Floyd Henson Black (1944–1955), American historian
- Duncan Smith Ballantine (1955–1961), American historian
- Patrick Murphy Malin (1962–1964), American activist
- Dwight James Simpson (1965–1967), American political scientist
- John Scott Everton (1968–1971), American diplomat
- Aptullah Kuran (1971–1979), Turkish historian of architecture and professor of Ottoman architecture
- Semih Tezcan (1979–1982), Turkish civil engineer
- Ergün Toğrol (1982–1992), Turkish civil engineer
- Üstün Ergüder (1992–2000), Turkish political scientist
- Sabih Tansal (2000–2004), Turkish electrical engineer
- Ayşe Soysal (2004–2008), Turkish mathematician
- Kadri Özçaldıran (2008–2012), Turkish electrical engineer
- Gülay Barbarosoğlu (2012–2016), Turkish industrial engineer
- Mehmed Özkan (2016–2021), Turkish biomedical engineer
- Melih Bulu (2021), Turkish industrial engineer and politician
- Mehmet Naci İnci (2021–present), Turkish physicist

== Notable faculty ==
- Lale Akarun, professor of computer engineering
- Cahit Arf, mathematician
- Engin Arık, professor of physics
- Attila Aşkar, professor of mathematics
- Ayşe Buğra, professor of political economy
- Tansu Çiller, former Prime Minister of Turkey, professor of economics
- Selim Deringil, professor of history
- Cem Ersoy, professor of computer engineering
- John Freely, professor of physics and author
- Erdal İnönü, former Deputy Prime Minister of Turkey; Professor Emeritus of Physics, Sabancı University, recipient of the Wigner Medal 2004
- Ersin Kalaycıoğlu, professor of political science
- Kemal Kirişci, professor of international relations, director of European Studies Center
- Aptullah Kuran, professor of art history
- Heath Lowry, professor of history, Princeton University
- Şerif Mardin, professor of sociology and political science
- Nevra Necipoğlu, professor of history
- Şevket Pamuk, professor of economic history, former president of European Historical Economics Society
- Betül Tanbay, professor of mathematics
- Karl von Terzaghi, civil engineer
- Cem Yıldırım, professor of mathematics

== Notable alumni ==
- Ezel Akay, film director
- Engin Ardıç, writer, journalist
- Nevzat Aydın, CEO and founder of Yemeksepeti
- Pelin Batu, actress, writer
- Aslı Biçen, novelist and translator
- Gülse Birsel, screenwriter, actress, journalist
- Cem Boyner, CEO of Boyner Holding, former chairman of TÜSİAD
- Cansu Canca, bioethicist, founder and director of AI Ethics Lab
- Nuri Bilge Ceylan, film director, winner of the Best Director Award at the Cannes Film Festival
- Tansu Çiller, former Prime Minister of Turkey, professor of economics at Boğaziçi University
- Ahmet Davutoğlu, former Prime Minister of Turkey, former Minister of Foreign Affairs, professor of international relations
- Sedef Ecer, novelist, playwright, actress and screenwriter
- Neşe Erberk, 1983 Miss Turkey, 1984 Miss Europe
- Erden Eruç, first solo human-powered circumnavigation and ocean rowing world record holder
- Fahriye Evcen, actress
- Emre Gönensay, former Minister of Foreign Affairs of Turkey, professor of economics at Boğaziçi University
- Faruk Gül, professor of economics at Princeton University
- Aydemir Güler, leader of the Communist Party of Turkey
- Murat Gülsoy, writer
- Nil Karaibrahimgil, singer and composer
- Perihan Mağden, writer, journalist
- Fatma Ceren Necipoğlu, harpist
- Hişyar Özsoy, politician
- Güler Sabancı, CEO of Sabancı Holding
- Ozge Samanci, artist, professor at Northwestern University
- Defne Samyeli, news reporter, anchorwoman, actress
- Mete Sozen, professor of structural engineering at Purdue University
- Barış Tan, professor of operations management and industrial engineering at Koç University
- Harun Tekin, rock musician, frontman of Mor ve Ötesi
- Teoman, singer and composer
- Murat Ülker, chairman of Yıldız Holding and Ülker
- Ahmet Yalçınkaya, poet
- Ahmet Yildiz, professor of biophysics at University of California, Berkeley
- Cem Yılmaz, comedian, actor, cartoonist
- Derviş Zaim, film director, writer

== See also ==
- List of American universities and colleges outside the United States
- List of universities in Turkey
- List of universities in Istanbul
