= Ottoman coffeehouse =

Distinctive part of the culture of the Ottoman Empire

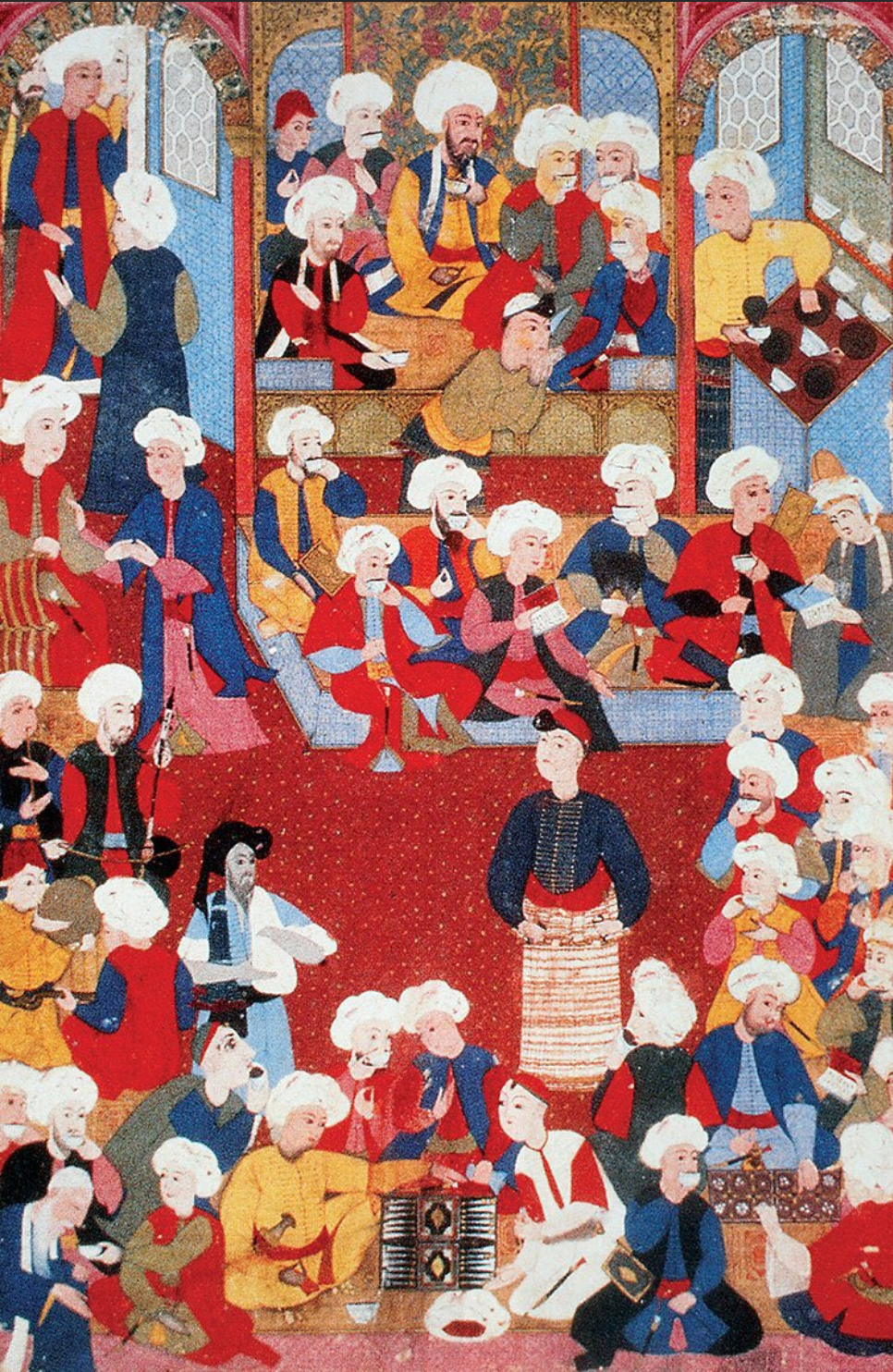
Ottoman miniature of a meddah performing at a coffeehouse

The Ottoman coffeehouse (Ottoman Turkish: قهوه‌خانه, romanized: kahvehane), or Ottoman café, was a distinctive part of the culture of the Ottoman Empire. These coffeehouses, started in the mid-sixteenth century, brought together citizens across society for educational, social, and political activity as well as general information exchange. The popularity of these coffeehouses attracted government interest and were attended by government spies to gather public opinion. Ottoman coffeehouses also had religious and musical ties. Europeans adopted coffeehouses and other Ottoman leisure customs during the early modern period.

The activity of coffee-drinking and coffeehouses originated in Arabia, and it moved to Egypt then to Iran then to the Ottoman Empire during the sixteenth century. In the Ottoman Empire, the first coffeehouse was opened in Istanbul in 1555 during the reign of Suleiman the Magnificent. It was founded by two merchants from Damascus and established in Tahtakale, Istanbul. Eventually, coffeehouses offered more than coffee; they began vending sweet beverages and candies. Coffeehouses also became more numerous and functioned as community hubs. Before their introduction, the home, the mosque, and the shop were the primary sites of interpersonal interaction. Eventually, though, there existed one coffeehouse for every six or seven commercial shops. By the end of the nineteenth century, there were nearly 2,500 coffeehouses in Istanbul alone.

== Background ==
Coffeehouses brought together men from all levels of society. Primarily masculine spaces, the tradition of the Ottoman coffeehouses was exported to the other European empires where coffee became a staple. In Protestant-majority countries, such as in Britain, coffee was thought to have antierotic as well as mentally stimulating properties. The idea that coffee would spur people into work and improve the quality of such work was highly compatible with the Protestant work ethic ideology. Free of sexual distractions and instilling asceticism, people could presumably live free from sin. It was seen as a positive alternative to alcohol, and Protestant visitors to the Ottoman Empire saw it as consistent was the Christian (Protestant) values of temperance and the Protestant work ethic.

According to The Reuben Percy Anecdotes compiled by journalist Thomas Byerley, an Armenian opened a coffee shop in Europe in 1674, at a time when coffee was first becoming fashionable in the West. Though Percy described these first European coffee houses as "imperfect" establishments where liquor and cigarettes were still consumed, he notes that it was an "error of the Armenian" that led to the establishment of a coffeehouse in Paris called Le Procope which introduced what Percy calls "ices".

Eminegül Karababa and Güliz Ger note that "rather than merely providing a place to drink coffee, the coffeehouse created a pleasant site for patrons to interact in". Coffeehouses drew together distinct groups, including academics, idlers, business men, and government officials. Despite this variety, not all citizens attended the same coffeehouses. Coffeehouses differed in scale, with some serving as neighborhood establishments and others as large community centers. As a result, sometimes different people would visit different shops.

Coffeehouse patrons shared some commonalities. For one, coffeehouses were restricted to the male populations; women and children were not allowed in these spaces. Coffeehouses were also principally Muslim gathering spots, though followers of other religions like Christianity were known to attend occasionally. These establishments broke down social barriers and allowed for socialization and information exchange.

== Activities ==
=== Educational ===
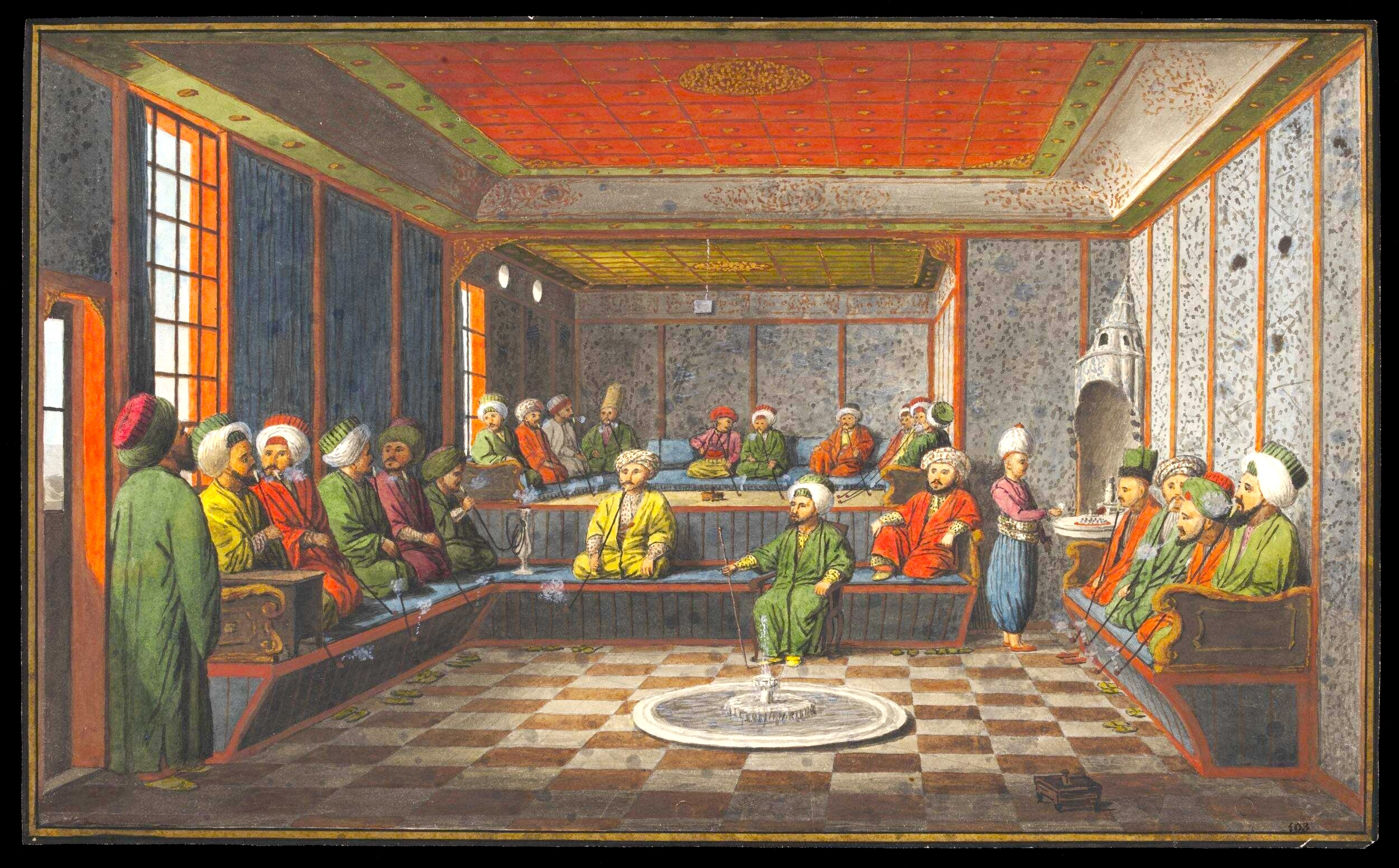
An Ottoman coffeehouse in Istanbul, c. 1809

Ottoman era coffeehouses democratized education across all stratums of society. Because individuals from a variety of backgrounds gathered in these coffeehouses, illiterate or low literacy people could sit alongside educated individuals. This diverse attendance enabled what scholar John Houghton called a "penny university," a statement conveying the virtually free nature of the education men could attend by visiting the coffeehouses. For instance, the bourgeoisie that attended coffeehouses desired to prove their enlightenment to elites through academic discourse. By being proximate to these academic discussions, less educated visitors could listen and learn from these conversations. Second, the more literate society members would hold public readings of the news, allowing the illiterate to stay informed. Even professional readers would sometimes visit coffeehouses to read the main news of the day. These readings were especially helpful for those who could not afford newspaper subscriptions. Ottoman coffeehouses allowed the members of lower society to receive informal education, instruction that was traditionally provided by universities and churches.

=== Social and entertainment activity ===
Coffeehouses provided a new venue for socialization to occur. Before them, hospitality events were reserved for the home. Gossip was now exchanged with coffee cups and around coffee tables. This gossip often included discussions of women, including about the chastity of known women by the community. In other cases, men would simply converse about daily ongoings or scandals. Sometimes, they would engage in entertainment activities like producing plays on everyday life satires. They would also host improvisational performances. Other times, shadow puppet shows would be produced or narrated stories would be told. The emergence of coffeehouses expanded the private sphere to allow many social conversations and experiences in public settings.

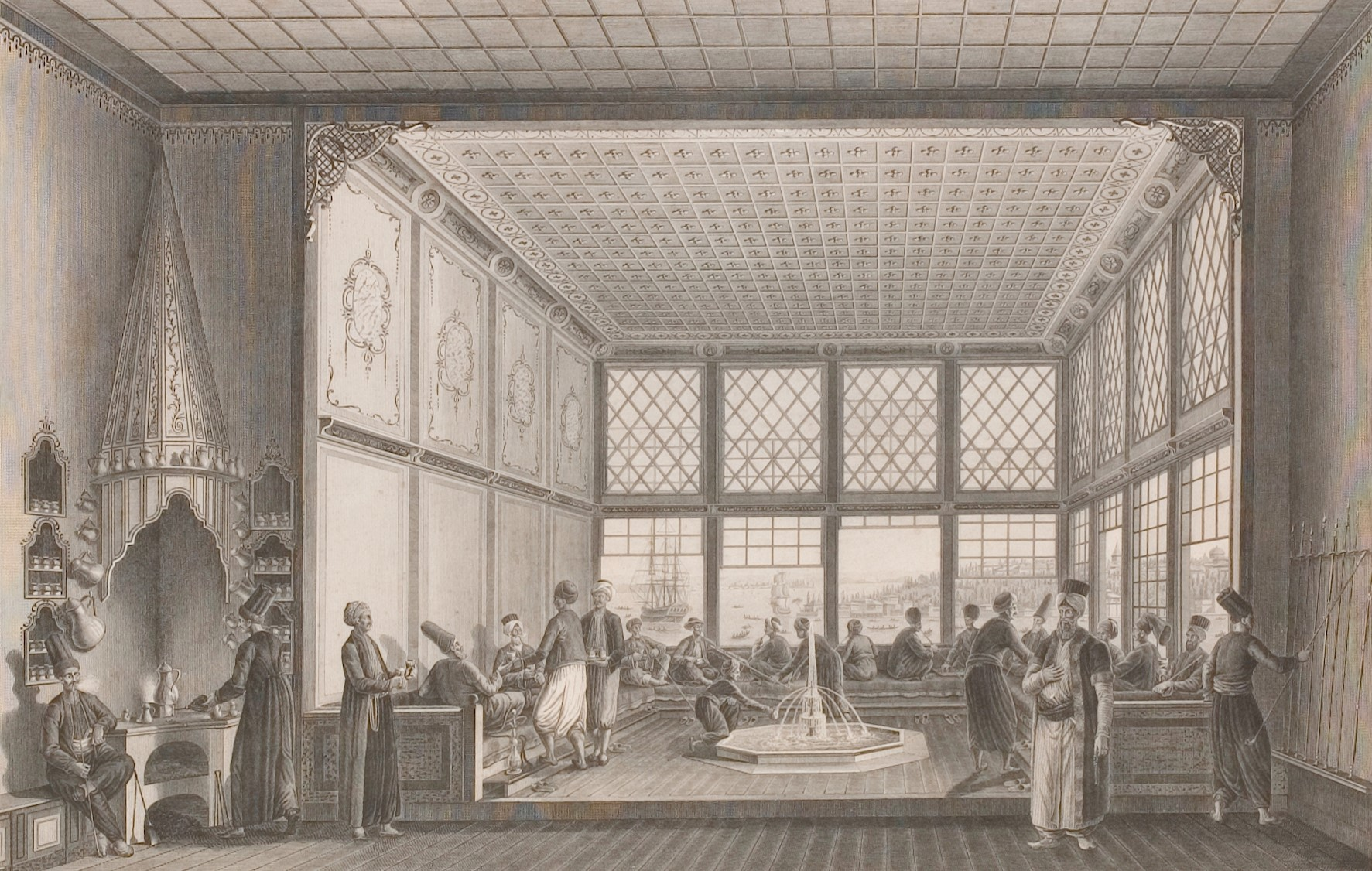
An Ottoman coffeehouse in Istanbul, c. 18th century

Before the rise of the coffeehouse, men were found at work, the mosque, or at home. The necessities of Ottoman life could be fulfilled by rotating through these three places. Referred to as the “Fourth Place,” the coffeehouse introduced a “neutral meeting ground” with “social leveling.” This was specifically prevalent in the sixteenth and seventeenth centuries, especially as urban Ottoman citizens longed for tight-knit, local, and familial society amid urbanization. The unit of organization was being further drowned out by the rise of the centralized state. Furthermore, the home-based host-guest binary was not present at the coffeehouse, creating greater levels of social equality. Similar to the master-slave model, hierarchy, while still important, was replaced with other identities in the space. Poets, politicians, scholars, dervishes, and, later, janissaries could meet in groups with similar interests to express their passions and thoughts. Verbal communication was a crucial commonality for all guests. After all, it was the chief means by which debates, plays, narrations, and even rebellions were organized. Jean de Thévenot, a French traveler in the Middle East, noted that men of all occupations, religions, or statuses could frequent coffeehouses. Thévenot recognized the “heterogeneity of coffeehouse clientele,” citing “socio-professional and confessional distinctions.” The main frequenters were artisans, shopkeepers, yet merchants from foreign countries like England, Russia, France, and Venice constituted the second largest group. Due to increased communication and interaction between distinct people, “mimetic processes” were developed in politics, art, and, most importantly, insurrection. Bureaucrats distributed information to military officers, just as writers exchanged works with poets; a truly dialectical process was shaping rich Ottoman culture. Over time, the coffeehouse, as a lucrative industry, gave agency to the market over religious or state authority.

=== Political activity ===
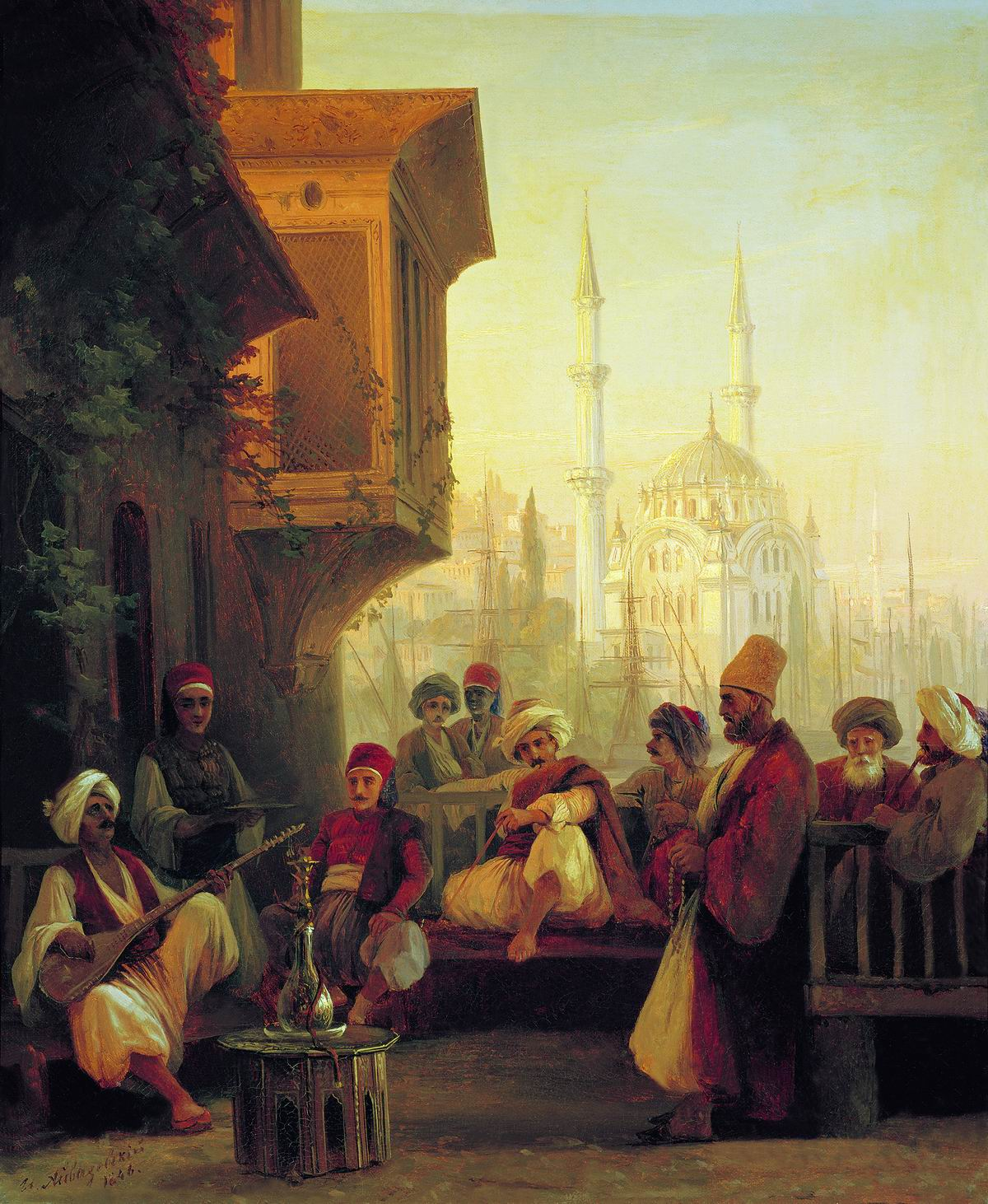
Coffee-house by the Ortaköy Mosque in Constantinople by Ivan Ayvazovsky

News updates were circulated and acts of government resistance were planned in coffeehouses. Without modern forms of communication and the limited accessibility of print news, coffeehouses enabled citizens to verbally update one another on news. News was often broken in these shops and political rumors started. Speculative conversations discussed cabinet changes, corruption scandals, and possibly initiations of war. In addition to information exchange, mutinies, coups, and other acts of political resistance were planned in coffeehouses. In particular, impassioned janissaries made coffeehouses their headquarters for meetings and discussions about political acts. Some janissaries even had their own coffeehouses which they marked with their insignia, the orta. Non-janissaries and janissaries would come together in these coffeehouses to plan rebellions to check the power of the Sultan and prevent absolutism. As hubs of discussion on the state, coffeehouses were opposed by the Ottoman government. They believed coffeehouses were locations of vice and disorder. Despite their efforts to burn or ban coffeehouses, these establishments persisted in popularity.

Within the Janissary-operated coffeehouses, the orta, or battalion, became the chief unit of organization. The warriors expressed strong loyalty to their individual orta and the coffeehouse provided the means to become increasingly isolated from the Ottoman authorities as well as connected to undercover networks for assassinations, gossip, and wealth. During the late Ottoman Empire, these units were carefully monitored for their overreaching influence and power in society, specifically by royal and other authorities. While seemingly harmless, the coffeehouses extended that power into civil society, allowing them to engage with others in private, secluded spaces. The transplantation of the coffeehouse to Europe provided a similar experience. For both imperial administration, the coffeehouse was a “metaphor for urban disorder, the culprit of society’s problems.” More importantly, if these coffeehouses were owned by a Janissary warrior or unit, authorities would have even greater trouble entering. Of the 95% of Muslim-owned coffeehouses, 42% were owned by Janissaries. The elite warriors participated in devlet sohbeti, a term meaning “state talk.” Many of these discussions spread rumors or private information amongst a highly intelligent and capable group. As the owners as well as clients of these establishments, the Janissaries controlled the flow of verbal communication and information in a time of low literacy rates. Since these specific Janissary groups functioned as a type of local police, their actions could be carried out with little to no consequences.

== Legal restrictions on coffeehouses ==
The Ottoman government was interested in coffeehouses, and they employed spies to visit them and collect public sentiment. These spies were often locals or recruited coffeehouse owners that answered to the police. While much is unknown about the spies, documents from the mid 19th century (1840-1845) show that the spies made weekly reports for the local police. These reports were shared with individuals as powerful as the Sultan. Spies were also assigned to surveil barber shops, mosques, private baths, and hotel rooms. But because coffeehouses were key locations for discourse and information exchange, the majority of spy reports included these types of conversations. The main objective of the spies was to collect public opinion, including everything from neighborhood gossip to planned political riots. These reports were not used to persecute individuals or accuse them of crimes. Instead, the reports constituted a form of micro surveillance where the government could quickly gather a range of public opinion on different topics.

Elite Ottomans were often dismissive–and anxious–about what the rest of the population got up to when they were not working. Their keenness for wine and smoking was one thing, but even worse were the coffeehouses where ordinary men tended to congregate. Lurid images were conjured up of the types of people who frequented them. Nacîmâ, for example, pictures a seedy coffeehouses at the port of Istanbul patronized, he claims, by unsavory types, thieves and runaway slaves, hangmen and the occasional debt collector. And writing later, in the seventeenth century, one Ottoman historian complained that the ‘lowest’ sort of person spent the whole day in coffeehouses, which provided the setting for immoral and seditious behavior.

There are also records of repeated attempts to impose legal restrictions or taxes on coffeehouses. Sultan Murad III, for example, banned the sale of boza, a mildly alcoholic malt beverage made with fermented cereals served in coffeehouses; Sultan Sultan Murad IV abolished coffeehouses entirely in 1633; and Abdülhamid’s undercover agents frequented coffeehouses to eavesdrop on patrons’ conversations. The legislation was at most symbolic, which the Ottoman state had no means to enforce, and had no long-lasting effect on the consumption of coffee.

Muslim legal scholars tended to worry about places where the lower orders congregate, and–while there were certainly a rough side and unsavory types –the reality of the normal coffeehouse was tamer than its reputation. For coffeehouses were not just drinking dens but an essential part of everyday life for those who lacked social spaces elsewhere in their city. The Ottoman rich, with their expansive homes and multiple dining rooms, entertained and socialized at home; the lower and middle classes, for whom the price of constructing separate entertainment spaces within the home was prohibitively expensive, had to go out to socialize. By the middle of the 17th century, Ottoman towns were full of coffeehouses, and it was here that a large number of ordinary Ottoman men spent many hours of their non-working lives. At the beginning of the nineteenth century, according to tax documents, there were well over a 2,500 coffeehouses in Istanbul, for a population of perhaps 400,000 residents, and travelers passing through.

== Gender in coffeehouses ==
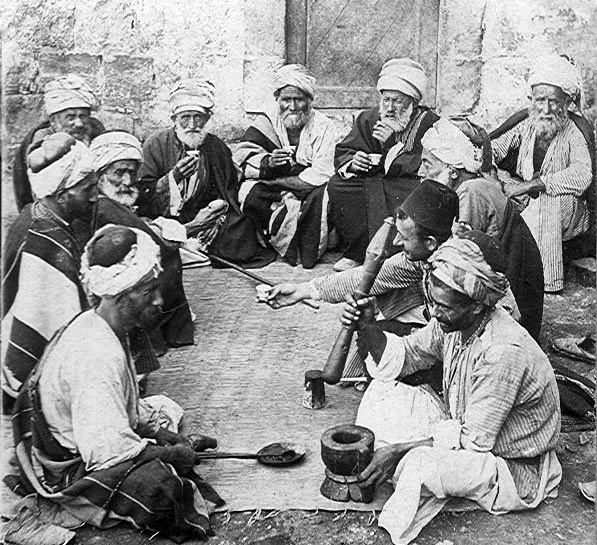
A gathering of men at a simple coffeehouse in Palestine, Ottoman Syria, around 1900

While men were the sole patrons of coffeehouses in the Ottoman Empire, these institutions were not created to entrench gender or space-based divisions. The coffeehouses were actually very reminiscent of the household. It was tailored to be familiar and, thus, comfortable for men. The removal of footwear was commonplace at home, and coffeehouses, specifically Anatolian, required the same etiquette. The front-room reception of these businesses also resembled that of the living room at home. Open late into the night, men would leave the home, which allowed women to establish a space for their own community. It was a mirroring institution that focused equally on socialization and discourse but for women only. The guests at these functions could “discuss neighbourhood affairs, conduct business, gossip and relax with one another.” Their male counterparts engaged in parallel conversations at the coffeehouses, focusing on day-to-day affairs. Thus, the name “coffeehouse” could have been named for their striking similarities with that of true Ottoman households of the time. A notable exception were Janissary coffeehouses which ran their business more like organized crime. At the same time, these businesses were far less private. Unlike the “visual privacy” of the home, coffeehouse windows were usually left open, so people could look both in and out. Specific references to the Qur’an cite this “gaze” and ask followers to demonstrate “modesty.” It challenged the highly regarded ideal of private life. The possibility of visually intruding on women or children in the house's interior was morally wrong. Since coffeehouses served males only, the absence of both these groups allowed for more lax norms.

== Protestantism and temperance ==
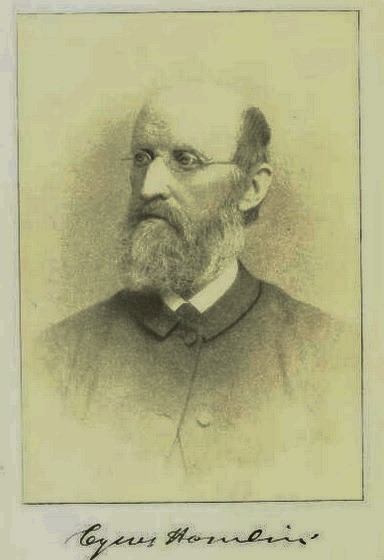
Cyrus Hamlin, co-founder of Robert College in Istanbul

In the 19th century Protestant missionaries set up several schools in the Ottoman Empire, including one in Istanbul that would later become Robert College. Cyrus Hamlin, who was president of the college until 1877 wrote: "Steam made Constantinople a commercial city and brought civilization, the arts and the vices of the West and East together in the Ottoman capital". He felt values were Christian rather than "Western" and both he and his successor George Washburn supported temperance in the Ottoman Empire. According to Mary Neuberger, "This inculcation of the Protestant work ethic was part of a more general assault on Balkan drunkenness and idleness." She writes that "many British and Americans writings celebrated the coffeehouse and even smoking as acceptable and regenerative forms of leisure, a sober foil to the drunken Balkan krŭchma" and that "the kafene was a presumed improvement for drunken and 'subjugated' Christian men."

Once the beverage was exported to the other European empires, coffee became a staple. For Protestant societies, such as in Britain, it was thought to have antierotic as well as mentally stimulating properties. The idea that coffee would spur people into work and improve the quality of such work was highly compatible with the Protestant work ethic ideology. Free of sexual distractions and instilling asceticism, people could presumably live free from sin.

== Music ==
Risto Pekka Pennanen argues that the Greek language café music is not an independent style as much as a "branch" of what she calls "Ottoman popular music", or the music that was performed at cafés and other leisure venues. She has written that some Greek writers "tend to underestimate the Ottoman element in smyrneika", explaining that "The nationalist point of view in Greek writing on music which stresses the domestic origins of cultural, political and social factors can be called hellenocentrism".

== Comparison with European coffeehouses ==
Coffee and tobacco were common to both European and Ottoman coffeehouses, but they also had some differences. Unlike the English and French coffeehouses, Ottoman coffeehouses did not serve alcohol or meals, and were not patronized by women. Some authors have written that "when a young man gazed through the window of a coffeehouse, he was aspriring to adulthood, and his admission to the institution was a communally recognized transition to adult life". Western European coffeehouses were also "masculine spaces", but women would sometimes go to coffeehouses despite social conventions, because no formal rules prohibited their attendance. Though women's participation in coffeehouse culture was not socially acceptable at first, it gradually became more acceptable in Western Europe throughout the 19th century. The traditional culture endured at Ottoman coffeehouses until the introduction of "cafés' in the 20th century.
