= George Washburn (educator) =

American philosopher

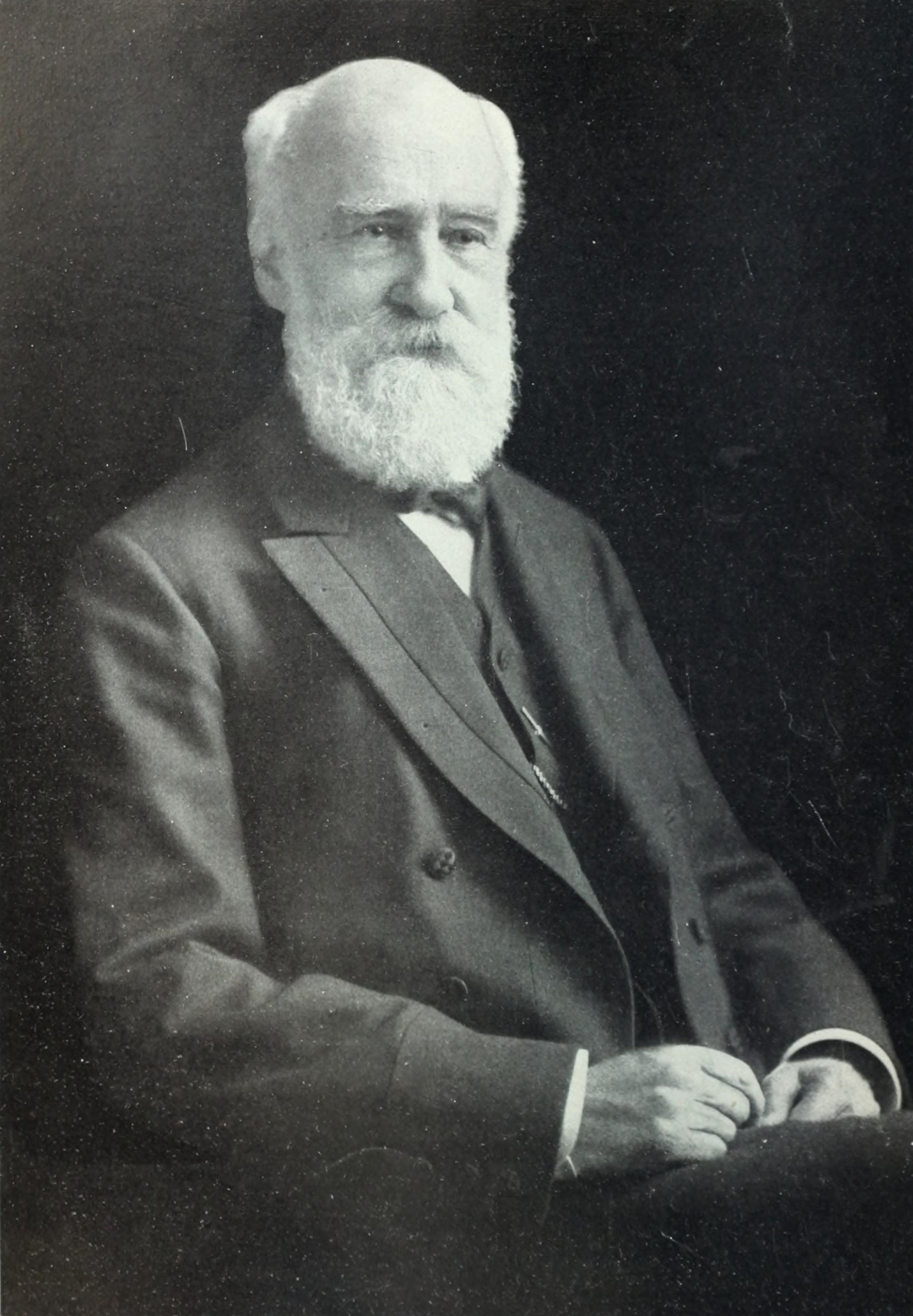

President of Robert College
- In office 1878 – 20 September 1903
- Preceded by: Cyrus Hamlin
- Succeeded by: Caleb Frank Gates

Personal details
- Born: March 1, 1833 Middleboro, Massachusetts, U.S.
- Died: February 15, 1915 (aged 81) Boston, Massachusetts, U.S.
- Resting place: Nemasket Hill Cemetery; 41°54′15.9″N 70°54′06.3″W
- Spouse: Henrietta Loraine Hamlin Washburn (m. 1859)
- Relatives: Cyrus Hamlin (father-in-law)
- Education: Amherst College; Andover Theological Seminary
- Occupation: Educator, missionary

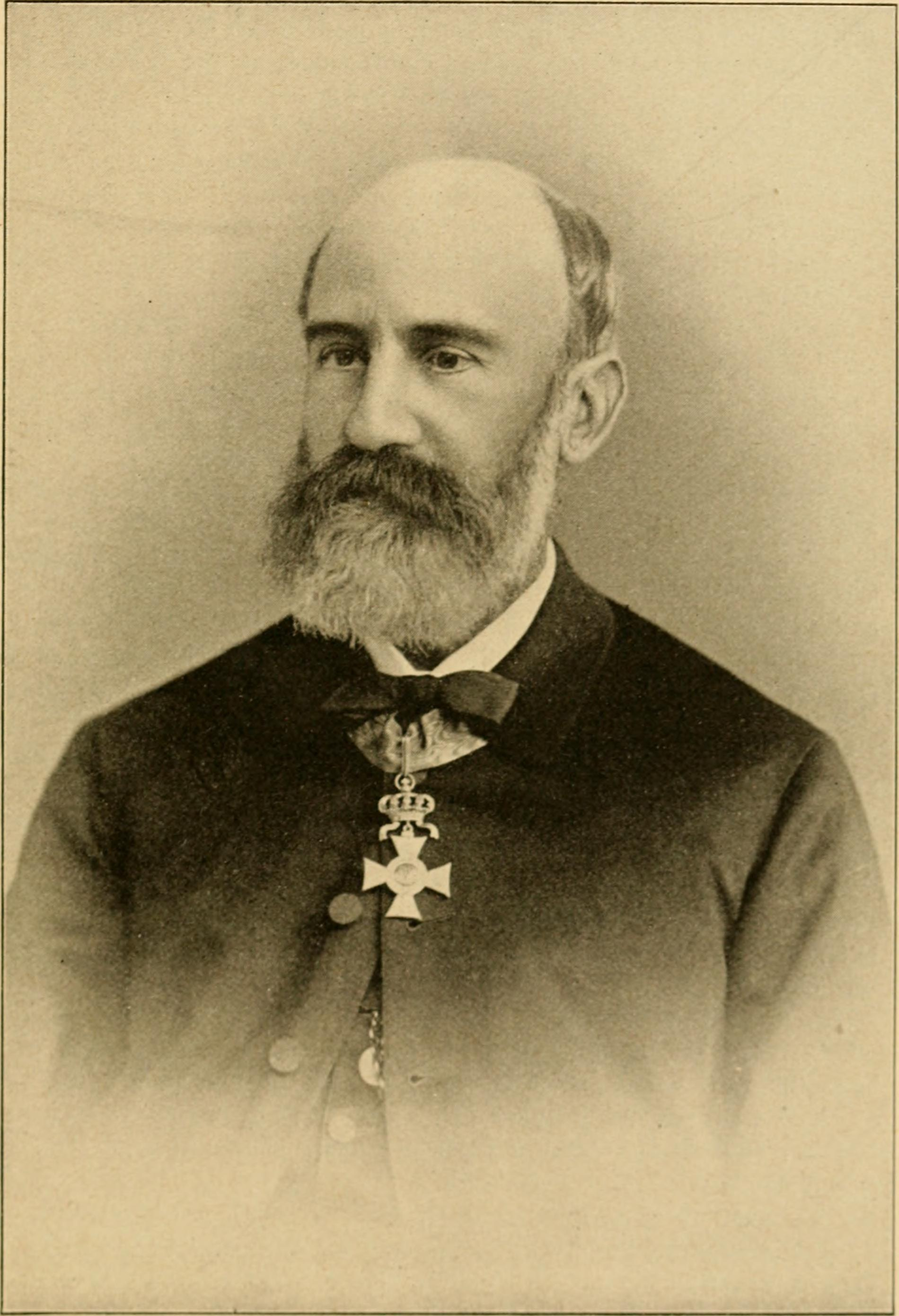
Rev. Geo. Washburn, c. 1893

George Washburn (March 1, 1833 – February 15, 1915) was an American educator, Christian missionary, and second president of Robert College.

== Biography ==
George Washburn was born on March, 1, 1833 in Middleboro, Massachusetts. His father Philander Washburn was a manufacturer and his mother Elizabeth Homes was a housewife. He attended Pierce Academy in his hometown of Middleboro and Phillips Academy in Andover, and graduated from Amherst College in 1855. Spending a year traveling Europe and the Middle East, he then attended Andover Theological Seminary in 1859 for one year.

He initially went to Constantinople as the treasurer of the American Board of Commissioners for Foreign Missions, an early American Christian missionary organization and, in 1859, married Henrietta Loraine, the daughter of Robert College president Cyrus Hamlin. Washburn returned to the Andover Seminary to complete his education in 1862, and was ordained as a Congregational minister the next year. Being appointed as a missionary for the American Board of Commissioners in Constantinople, he returned to the city, and subsequently became professor of philosophy in Robert College.

Leaving Constantinople to pursue Christian work in New York City, he returned a year later at the request of Christopher Robert, founder of Robert College, and became acting president of the school between 1870 and 1877, replacing his father-in-law. Washburn was appointed president in 1878, and retained his role until September 20, 1903. He was an authority on the political questions of southeastern Europe. In 1876 he was instrumental, together with Dr. Albert Long, in sounding the first alarm and publicizing the Turkish massacres in Bulgaria. During the World's Parliament of Religions in Chicago, in 1893, he delivered an address on Islam. He contributed many articles regarding current affairs, history, and geology to English and American periodicals such as The Contemporary Review and the American Journal of Science. He was offered the role of the United States ambassador to Turkey, but denied it due to a potential conflict of interest relating to his missionary work. He was also the Founder Principal of American College, Madurai.

He died at his home in Boston on February 15, 1915.

== Honors ==
- The National Assembly of liberated Bulgaria at their first session in 1879 accorded him a vote of thanks in recognition of his service to the Bulgarian cause.
- Commander of the Princely Order of Saint Alexander (Bulgaria).
- Grand Officer of the National Order of Civil Merit (Bulgaria).
- Streets in Sofia and Sliven, Bulgaria are named after him.

== Selected bibliography ==
- Anonymous (September 1873). "The Geology of the Bosphorus". American Journal of Science. 6 (33): 186–193. Bibcode:1873AmJS....6..186A. doi:10.2475/ajs.s3-6.33.186. S2CID 219245898 – via Internet Archive.
- "Calvert's Supposed Relics of Man in the Miocene of the Dardanelles". Proceedings of the American Association for the Advancement of Science. XXII (2): 203–205. 1874. hdl:2027/hvd.32044092861582.
- "Mohammedanism". The Message of the World Religions. New York: Longmans, Green, and Co. 1898. pp. 65–85 – via Internet Archive.
- Fifty Years in Constantinople and Recollections of Robert College (1 ed.). Boston & New York: Houghton Mifflin Company. 1909 – via Internet Archive.
- Washburn, George (January 1911). "Probable Influence of the Turkish Revolution on the Faith of Islam". The Journal of Race Development. 1 (3): 302–315. JSTOR 29737866.
