= Mabel Robinson =

American writer

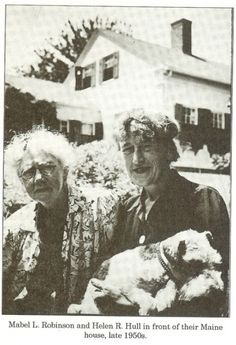
Mabel Robinson and Helen Hull

Mabel Louise Robinson (July 19, 1874 – February 21, 1962) was an American writer of books for children and young adults. Her "primary goal in life [was to] write books for young women, showcasing the protagonists' worth, intelligence, and sensitivity." Robinson brought "realistic and believable young adult problems to modern girl readers looking not only for excitement and fun but for honesty and reality as well," creating "vivid characters with whom girls could easily identify." Robinson was twice a runner-up for the annual Newbery Medal.

== Early life and education ==
Mabel Louise Robinson was born and raised in Waltham, Massachusetts. She was the daughter of James Frank and Mary Anna Dean Robinson. Robinson graduated high school and attended Radcliffe College from 1904 to 1906. While teaching at various colleges, Robinson worked on completing her master's degree (1907) and Ph.D. (1915) at Columbia University in New York City.

== Career ==
After graduating high school, Robinson became an elementary school teacher. Robinson taught at a number of colleges and universities throughout her career. At Wellesley College in Wellesley, Massachusetts, she taught zoology from 1904 to 1906. From 1919 to 1945, she taught advanced fiction writing workshops at Columbia University in New York City. Although she taught a variety of subjects, she is probably best known for her classes at Columbia University. While she was at Columbia, she taught a workshop that resulted in the publication of over 200 books. Robinson also taught at Constantinople College in Istanbul, Turkey. She conducted research for the Carnegie Foundation in New York City. Robinson wrote children's books, frequently featuring dogs. Robinson contributed short stories to periodicals including The Delineator, Portal, St. Nicholas Magazine, and The Youth's Companion. Two of her books were designated Newbery Honor books by the American Library Association. She said that writing interesting books for young people was more important than obtaining her doctorate in education.

Robinson taught advanced writing classes for over 25 years at Columbia University and took great pride in her students' accomplishments. Robinson "breathed life into a coastal area of Maine" and had an interest in dogs and zoology. She developed "young female characters who ventured beyond their isolated childhoods into the wider world, often to return to their childhood home with a renewed appreciation." Her books about dogs include Dr. Tam O’Shanter (1921), stories that appeared in St. Nicholas Magazine, Robin and Tito (1931), Robin and Angus (1931), and Robin and Heather (1932).

== Personal life ==
She taught creative writing at Columbia University with her lifelong partner, Helen Rose Hull. Robinson died February 21, 1962.

== Cultural impact ==
As a well-known author, Newbery runner-up and instructor of many successful authors, Robinson made an impact with both her work and her teaching. Many of Robinson's books have been used in elementary schools. In a forum dedicated to education, one teacher recommends the book King Arthur and his Knights for classes studying medieval times. Robinson's how-to books for writing are also very popular. Christian author Perry Thomas has said that "The best book on writing I've ever used is Writing for Young People by Mabel Louise Robinson." Among Robinson's students was Walter Farley, author of The Black Stallion, a series of well known children's books. She also taught Ann Petry, author of The Street (1946), the first novel by an African-American woman to sell more than a million copies. Many of her books, such as Bright Island and Strong Winds, were set in Maine.

== Selected works ==
- Dr. Tom O’Shanter, Dutton (New York, NY), 1921
- Little Lucia, Dutton (New York, NY), 1922
- Juvenile Story Writing, Dutton (New York, NY), 1922
- Little Lucia and Her Puppy, Dutton (New York, NY), 1923
- Little Lucia’s Island Camp, Dutton (New York, NY), 1924
- Little Lucia’s School, illustrated by Sophia T. Balcom, Dutton (New York, NY), 1926
- (With Helen Rose Hull) Creative Writing: The Story Form, American Book Co. (New York, NY), 1932
- Bright Island, illustrated by Lynd Ward, Random House (New York, NY), 1937. — a Newbery Medal runner-up
- Runner of the Mountain Tops: The Life of Louis Agassiz, illustrated by Ward, Random House (New York, NY), 1939. — a Newbery runner-up
- Bitter Forfeit, Bobbs-Merrill (Indianapolis, IN), 1947
- Writing for Young People, Nelson (New York, NY), 1950
- Skipper Riley, the Terrier Sea Dog, illustrated by Shortall, Random House (New York, NY), 1955
- Riley Goes to Obedience School, illustrated by Shortall, Random House (New York, NY), 1956
