= Helen Rose Hull =

American novelist (1888–1971)

Helen R. Hull, c. 1938

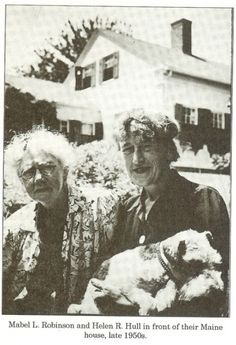
Mabel Robinson and Helen Hull

Helen Rose Hull (March 28, 1888 – July 15, 1971) was born in Albion, Michigan. She is remembered as a novelist, feminist, and English professor. Beginning her teaching career at Wellesley College and Barnard College, she went on to teach creative writing at the Ivy League institution, Columbia University for forty years with her lifelong partner, Mabel Louise Robinson.

== Early life ==
Hull was born in Albion, Michigan, as the eldest child of her family on March 28, 1888, to Warren C. and Minnie Louise McGill Hull. Her father was a teacher, school superintendent of the Albion Public Schools (1888 to 1901), and real estate agent; her mother a school teacher before marriage. Hull's grandfather Levi T. Hull encouraged her as a child by publishing her stories in his Michigan newspaper, the Constantine Mercury. At a young age, Helen and her brother became financially responsible for their family, as their father remained unemployed after World War I. Helen attended Lansing High School and Michigan State University. After graduating, she became an elementary school teacher.

== Career ==
In 1914, she began her career as a writer, which lasted for over fifty years. Her first published piece was a one-act play in the suffrage magazine, The Woman's Journal. She also contributed several stories to the leftist magazine The Masses around that time. Throughout her career, Hull published seventeen novels and sixty-five short stories. Her short stories appeared in more than fourteen different American magazines, including Colliers, Century, Saturday Evening Post, Harper's, Cosmopolitan, and Ladies Home Journal. The topic of her writing included familial relationships, gender differences, and social issues, including race and women's economic status. Despite being involved in radical politics early in life, Hull mainly addressed issues through the stories of her characters. It is speculated that her decreased involvement in the political scene was due to her publisher's concern that Hull's lesbianism would be "detrimental to her career."

One of Hull's students at Wellesley was Soong Mei-ling, who went on to become Madame Chiang Kai-shek. Hull later wrote a biography of the woman.

Hull died in 1971 at the age of 83.

=== Quest and Islanders ===
Hull's first novel, Quest, received generally positive reviews upon its publication in 1922. Another one of her notable novels, Islanders, was published in 1927 and is set in the Midwest during the mid-19th century to World War I. It tells the story of a single woman who has to take care of her parents, her siblings, and her siblings' children. Through the growth of this intelligent and inventive woman, Hull poses important questions about the role of a woman during this period.

== Reviews ==
Her fictional pieces were praised by noteworthy sources including the New York Times, the New York Herald Tribune, and the Boston Transcript.

== Bibliography ==
Fiction

- Quest (1922)
- Labyrinth (1923)
- The Surry Family (1925)
- Islanders ( 1927)
- The Asking Price (1930)
- Heat Lightning (1932)
- Hardy Perennial (1933)
- Morning Shows the Day (1934)
- Candle Indoors
- Frost Flower
- Through the House Door (1940)
- Circle in the Water (1942
- Hawk's Flight (1946)
- Landfall (1953)

Short Stories and Novellas

- Uncommon People (1936)
- "Snow in Summer", in The Flying Yorkshireman (5 novellas) (1938)
- Last September (1939)
- Experiment (1940)
- Octave (1947)

Mystery

- A Tapping on the Wall (1960)
- Close Her Pale Blue Eyes (1963)

Non-Fiction

- Mayling Soong Chiang (1943) (biography)
- The Writer's Book (1950)
- Writer's Roundtable (1959)
