= Bright Island =

Book by Mabel Robinson

- Author: Mabel Robinson
- Language: English
- Genre: Children's literature
- Publisher: Random House
- Publication date: 1937
- Publication place: United States of America
- Media type: Print (hard~ & paperback)
- Pages: 288 pp
- ISBN: 037597136X

Bright Island is a children's novel by Mabel Robinson. It tells the story of Thankful Curtis, who, having grown up on a small island off the coast of Maine, reluctantly agrees to attend school on the mainland for her senior year. The novel, illustrated by Lynd Ward, was first published in 1937 and was a Newbery Honor recipient in 1938.

== Plot summary ==
Thankful Curtis, a sixteen-year-old girl and the youngest child of Mary and Jonathan Curtis, lives on her family’s small island off the coast of Maine. Home-schooled by her mother, Thankful has grown up largely alone, spending her days sailing her boat, the Gramp, with her pet, a crippled seagull named Limpy.

After her grandfather dies, Thankful’s four brothers and their wives return to the island for Sunday dinner. They argue that Thankful should attend high school on the mainland, and her parents agree. A young friend from the mainland, Dave Allen, who is studying seamanship, also encourages her to pursue formal education. Learning that her grandfather left her a legacy for her education, Thankful decides to enroll at “the Academy” rather than economize by attending public school while living with relatives.

Dave passes his seamanship exams and accepts a position aboard a government cutter. He suggests that they might marry in a year, but Thankful, though loyal to him, is curious about the Academy experience.

At the Academy, Thankful encounters electric lights, running hot water, and a busy communal life. She is assigned to share a room with Selina, a snobbish girl who initially mistakes her for a maid, and whose popular and handsome boyfriend, Robert, owns his own sloop. Thankful’s isolated upbringing makes her socially awkward, but her abilities are quickly recognized by the staff. Latin master Orin Fletcher moves her into senior classes so she can complete the curriculum in one year. Visiting the coast, she impresses Robert with her maritime knowledge and befriends an elderly local, Mr. Dinkly, who invites her to lobster-trapping on weekends.

At a costume party organized by Selina, Thankful wears her late brother Robbie’s Highland tartan. Encouraged by Fletcher, she learns the foxtrot and performs a Highland Fling, earning applause and securing her place in Academy society as well as Selina’s grudging respect. Robert, offended by her awkwardness with a waltz, begins to treat her coolly.

After an outing with Mr. Dinkly, Thankful rescues Robert and Selina when their sloop capsizes before reaching harbor. Selina is grateful, and Robert appears appreciative. During Thanksgiving, Mary Curtis invites Thankful home and encourages her to bring a friend; Selina attends and charms the family and Dave, who shows both girls the cutter on which he now serves.

At Christmas, Robert accompanies Thankful to the island while studying for Harvard examinations. His disdain alienates Jonathan and Thankful’s brothers, though he charms their wives. His deception regarding a radio gift from Selina confirms Thankful’s poor opinion of him. Failing his examinations, Robert soon turns his attention elsewhere.

In her second term, Thankful excels in a navigation course in which Fletcher participates as a mature student. A class excursion on Dave’s cutter ends in mishap when Selina is swept overboard; Dave rescues her, but Robert later claims credit, and Selina does not contradict him. Dave is offered an opportunity to become a steamship pilot.

During Easter, Mary Curtis contracts pneumonia after returning from the mainland. Fletcher takes Thankful home and brings a specialist, Dr. Dean. After her mother recovers, Fletcher confesses his love and invites Thankful to accompany him abroad to Oxford. Thankful declines, feeling unable to leave her family and the island. Her sense of belonging is confirmed when Dave’s cutter returns.

By May, Thankful has passed her examinations. Her mother acknowledges her growth into womanhood and informs her that her grandfather left her sole ownership of the island. Dave returns to Thankful in his pilot’s uniform, as she looks forward to marrying him, fulfilling a childhood hope she had spoken of to her grandfather.
