= Runner of the Mountain Tops =

Runner of the Mountain Tops: The Life of Louis Agassiz is a children's biography of Louis Agassiz, the nineteenth-century paleontologist and natural scientist, by Mabel Robinson. It tells his life story from his boyhood in Switzerland to his professorship at Harvard. Illustrated by Lynd Ward, the biography was first published in 1939 and was a Newbery Honor recipient in 1940.
