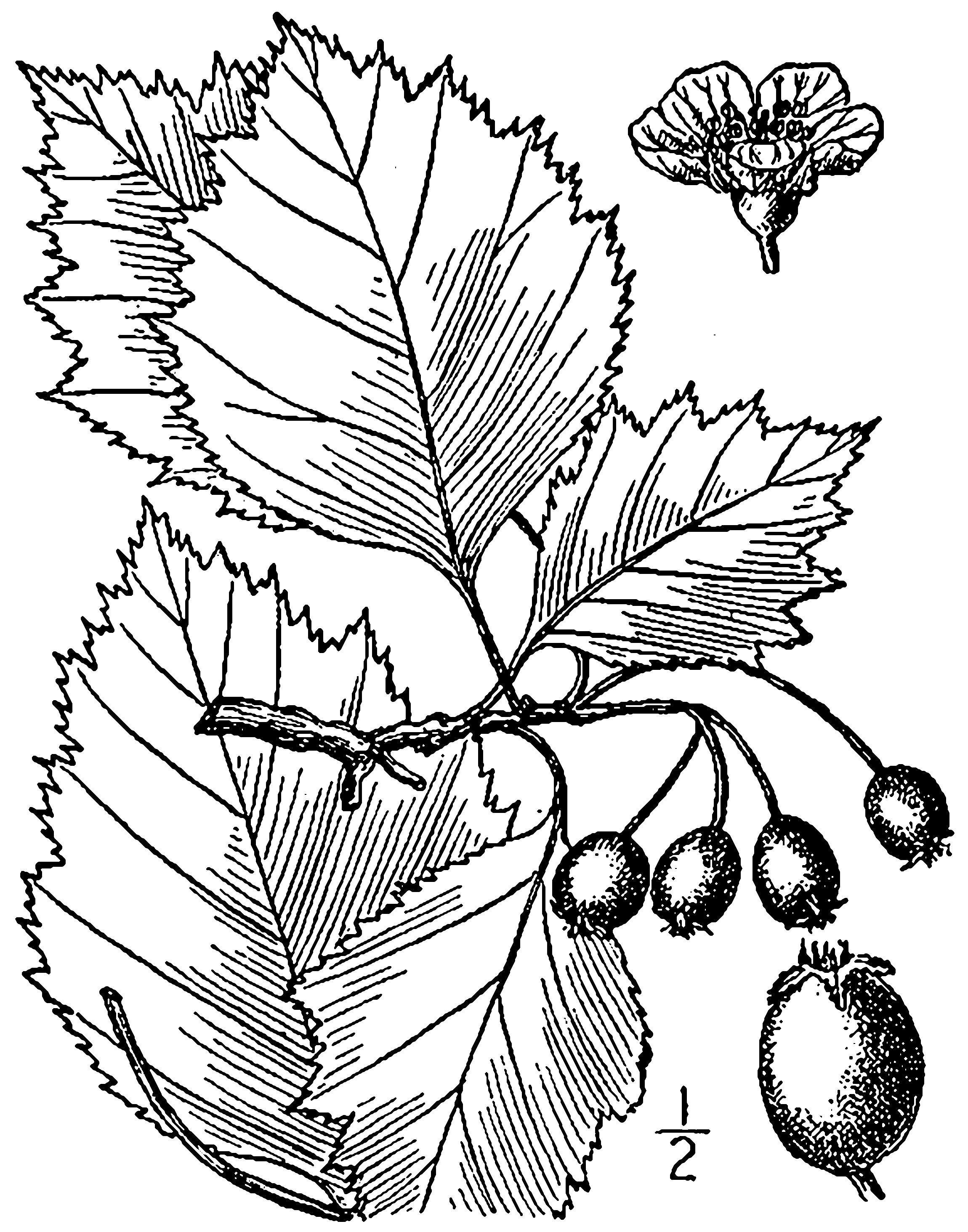

Conservation status
- Least Concern (IUCN 3.1)

- Secure (NatureServe)

Scientific classification
- Kingdom: Plantae
- Clade: Tracheophytes
- Clade: Angiosperms
- Clade: Eudicots
- Clade: Rosids
- Order: Rosales
- Family: Rosaceae
- Genus: Crataegus
- Species: C. brainerdii

Binomial name
- Crataegus brainerdii Sarg.
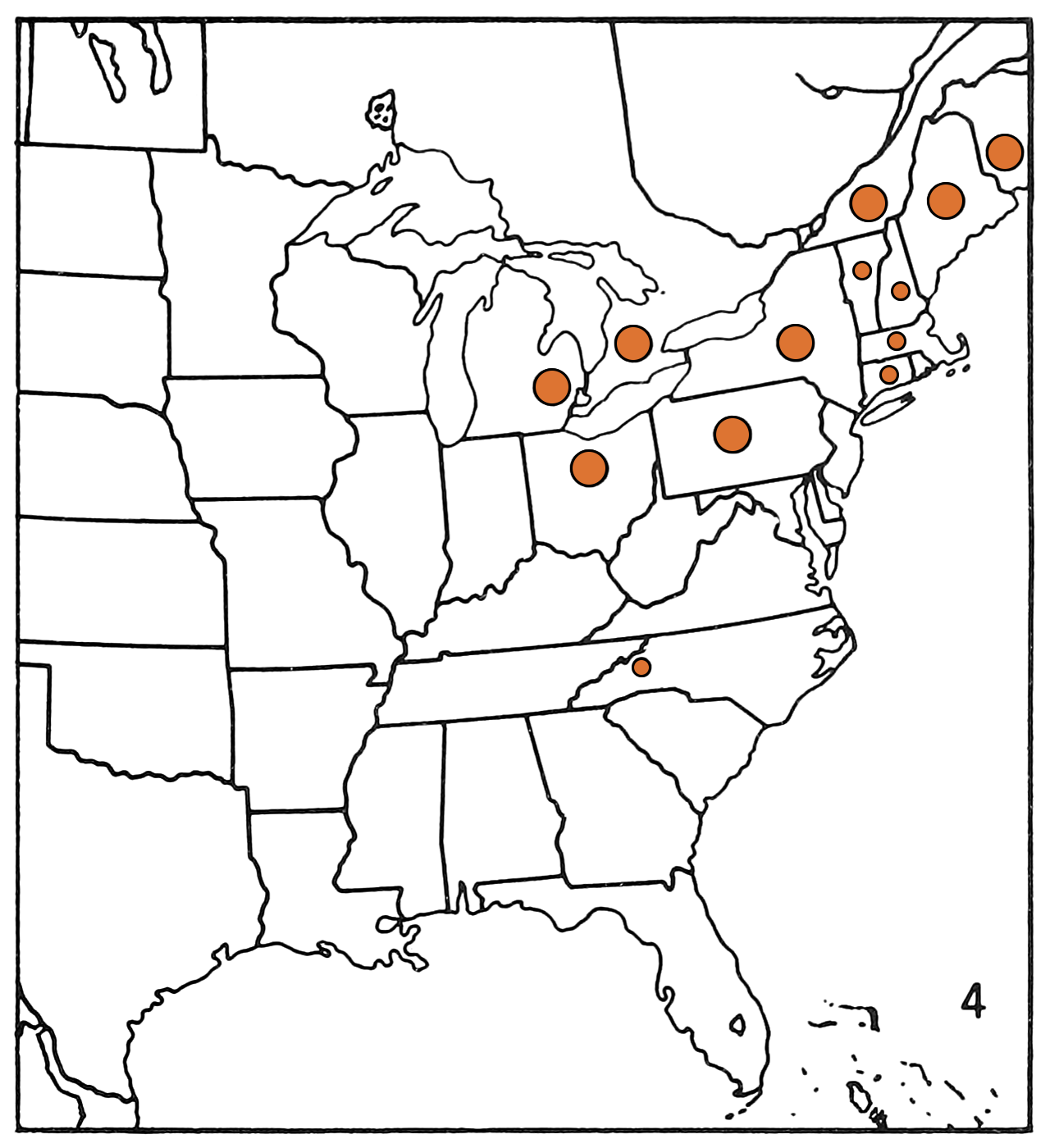
- Range of Crataegus brainerdii in North America

= Crataegus brainerdii =

Species of hawthorn

Crataegus brainerdii is a species of flowering plant in the rose family known by the common name Brainerd's hawthorn. It is named for Ezra Brainerd (1844–1924), a renowned botanist and former president of Middlebury College, in Vermont.

It is native to eastern North America, including eastern Canada and the eastern United States.

This species is a shrub or small tree growing up to 30 feet tall. The branches are lined with thorns up to 1.6 inches long. The serrated leaves are somewhat triangular in shape and sometimes slightly lobed. They are hairy when new. The flowers are borne in clusters. The rounded fruit is red and juicy.

This species grows best in full sunlight and well-drained soils, but it will tolerate wet soils and drought conditions. It can be planted in urban environments. It can be used as a windbreak. It is good for erosion control. The fruits attract animals.
