= Feyyaz Berker =

Turkish businessman (1925-2017)

- Born: October 7, 1925; Mersin, Turkey
- Died: August 22, 2017 (aged 91)
- Education: Robert College
- Occupation: Businessman
- Known for: Co-founder of Tekfen Holding

Feyyaz Berker (October 7, 1925 – August 22, 2017) was a Turkish businessman He was one of the three co-founders and owners of the Tekfen Holding.

== Biography ==
Born on October 7, 1925, in Mersin, Turkey, Feyyaz was the son of Muhtar Berker, an ophthalmologist based in Mersin, who was elected to the Grand National Assembly of Turkey in 1939 as İçel deputy and remained in office until 1946. After completing his primary education in Mersin, Feyyaz enrolled in the American College in Tarsus, but after his family moved to Ankara, he went to Robert College where received his diploma in civil engineering, subsequently he went to the United States to earn a master's degree from the University of Michigan. Then he returned to Turkey to finish his military service, and by 1950 he started working at the Ministry of Public Works. After working as construction manager at Ankara Esenboğa Airport, he became the Head of the Laboratory and Research Department of the Ministry of Public Works in 1954. Later, in 1956, he founded Tekfen Holding with Nihat Gökyiğit, his friend from Robert College, and Necati Akçağlılar, which became one of Turkey's leading holding companies. He also founded the Turkish Industrialists and Businessmen’s Association.

Feyyaz Berker died on August 22, 2017, at the age of 92, and was buried in the Aşiyan Asri Cemetery.
