= Christopher Robert =

American philanthropist (1802–1878)

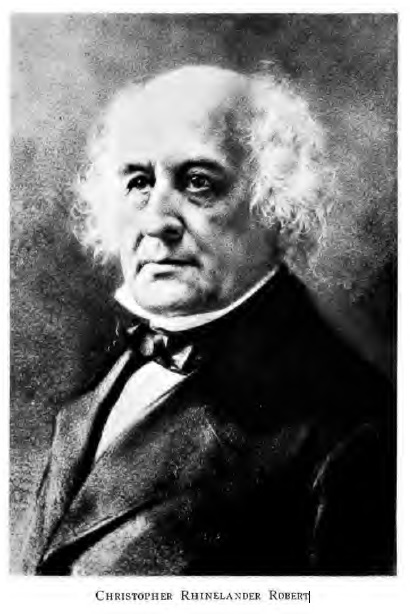
Christopher Rhinelander Robert, the founder of Robert College, which still bears his name

Christopher Rhinelander Robert (March 23, 1802 – October 28, 1878) was an American philanthropist from New York City, who founded Robert College in Istanbul, Turkey, in 1863, arguably the oldest American school outside the United States.

== Biography ==
Robert was born on March 23, 1802, in Brookhaven, Long Island, New York. His mother was Mary Tangier Smith (1763–1829) and his father, Dr. Daniel Robert III (1742–1804). He served five years as a shipping clerk in New York City before starting a business for himself in New Orleans. In about 1830 he returned to New York and started a partnership with Howell Lewis Williams (1792–1872). The company was Robert & Williams and they described their business as "Commissioning Business; the buying and selling of merchandise and the refining of sugar". Robert remained the senior partner until he retired in 1862.

In 1830 he married Anna Maria Shaw (1802–1878); they had four children, Jane, Christopher, Frederick, and Howell. The children were christened at the Presbyterian Brainerd Church in Rivington Street, New York. This church was founded by Robert in 1835 and he recruited, Asa Dodge Smith to be the Pastor. Robert became the superintendent of the Sabbath School, and he was also a ruling elder in the Laight Street, New York, Presbyterian Church.

Robert came into contact with the American Home Missionary Society in about 1829 when he asked them to provide a minister for a mining settlement in Galena. This began an association that lasted for nearly 40 years during which time he was a supporter, counselor, and treasurer. He also provided bursaries for many theological students and funded Beloit, Lookout Mountain, and Hamilton colleges and a seminary at Auburn.

On 1856 Robert met Cyrus Hamlin when visiting Istanbul. From this meeting came the founding of the Robert College with the financial backing of Robert and others. He also left provision in his will for the support of the college.

Robert was a stockholder in the Delaware, Lackawanna and Western Railroad. In 1857 the then president, George Dwight Phelps, accused several of the managers and the treasurer of conflicts of interest. In particular, this concerned contract was made between them and the Central Railroad of New Jersey. Robert was appointed to investigate the matter and came into conflict with Phelps who later resigned. In 1858 Robert was appointed the president of the railroad, and remained so until he retired in 1863. He died in Paris, France, on October 28, 1878.

In 1898, Robert's son, Christopher, died of a gunshot wound. It was assumed that he committed suicide but there were some unexplained circumstances. Christopher had been a junior partner in his father's firm and had married Margaret McCrea in about 1860. She was the sister of Mary McCrea, wife of sugar refiner Robert L. Stuart.
