= Ezra Brainerd =

American academic administrator (1844–1924)

8th President of Middlebury College
- In office 1885–1908
- Preceded by: Cyrus Hamlin
- Succeeded by: John Martin Thomas

Personal details
- Born: December 17, 1844 St. Albans, Vermont, U.S.
- Died: December 8, 1924 (aged 79)
- Occupation: Academic administrator

Ezra Brainerd (December 17, 1844 – December 8, 1924) was president of Middlebury College, Vermont, United States, from 1885 to 1908.

Born in St. Albans, Vermont, Brainerd was a graduate of the college in 1864. Brainerd assumed the presidency at a time when the college was recovering from an extended period of hardship. Brainerd remained president for 23 years, during which time the student body doubled, Starr Library and Warner Hall were constructed, and the college changed from an almost exclusively local college into a more regionally oriented institution. Brainerd was an educator with diverse interests, teaching in almost every subject, from physics to mathematics, to English and rhetoric. He was especially interested in botany; his papers and letters are in several herbaria and libraries throughout New England and the East. Brainerd's diverse talents and interests also informed his educational philosophy. Brainerd focused his efforts on strengthening and broadening the education offered by Middlebury rather than enforcing discipline and religion.

In 1995, when Middlebury initiated a system of residential commons, Brainerd Commons was named in his honor.

A type of Hawthorn, Crataegus brainerdii, is named in his honor.

Preceded by Cyrus Hamlin	President of Middlebury College; 1885–1908	Succeeded by John Martin Thomas
