= Behçet Kemal Çağlar =

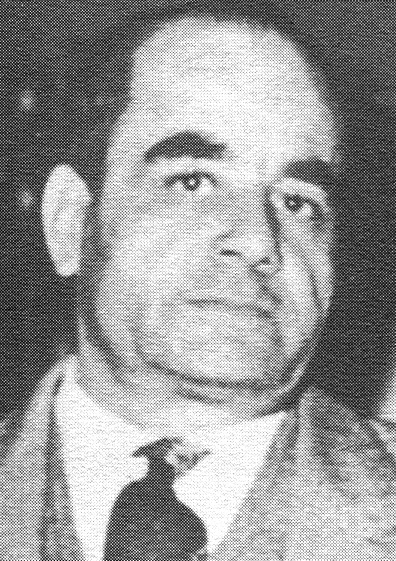

Background information
- Born: 1908 Erzincan, Ottoman Empire
- Died: 24 October 1969 (aged 60–61) Istanbul, Turkey
- Genres: Ottoman classical music Turkish makam music
- Occupation: Lyrics author

Behçet Kemal Çağlar (1908 – 24 October 1969) was a Turkish poet, educator and nationalist politician.

== Biography ==
Çağlar graduated as a senior mining engineer in 1929. He served as a regional manager at MTA (Turkish Mining Survey and Research Department), and for a short while, was a Member of Parliament.

In 1949 Çağlar published the magazine Şadırvan. He also directed the radio program "Şiir Dünyamız" (meaning Our World of Poetry in Turkish). Common themes in his poetry included Kemalism and populism.

Behçet Kemal Çağlar taught Turkish Literature at Robert College (American college founded in 1862 in Istanbul, Turkey).

== See also ==
- Turkish poetry
