= Robert College =

Private selective high school in Turkey

Coordinates: 41.066944°N 29.034861°E

- Robert Kolej
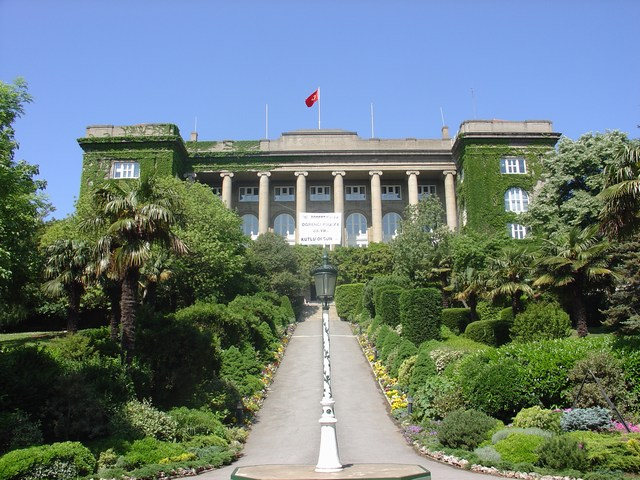

Location
- Kuruçeşme Cad. No. 87; Arnavutköy, Beşiktaş, Istanbul; Turkey

Information
- Type: Independent, day and boarding
- Established: 1863; 163 years ago
- Founder: Christopher Robert and Cyrus Hamlin
- CEEB code: 696220
- Headmaster: Whitman Shepard and Nilhan Çetinyamaç
- Grades: Prep, 9–12
- Gender: Co-educational
- Enrollment: 1,045; 190 boarding 276 on scholarship
- Language: English, Turkish
- Campus size: 265 acres (107 ha)
- Campus type: Urban
- Houses: Gould Hall, Mitchell Hall, Woods Hall, Sage Hall, Bingham Hall, Feyyaz Berker Hall, Suna Kıraç Hall, Nejat Eczacıbaşı Hall
- Student Union/Association: Robert College Student Council
- Color
- Mascot: Bobcat
- Team name: Bobcats
- Accreditation: NYSAIS
- Newspaper: Bosphorus Chronicle
- Yearbook: Record
- Website: website.robcol.k12.tr/en/home-page

American Robert College of Istanbul (Note: often abbreviated as Robert or RC; Turkish: İstanbul Özel Amerikan Robert Lisesi or Robert Kolej [ˈɾobæɾt koˈleʒ]) is an independent, co-educational, private high school in Istanbul, Turkey. Founded in 1863, Robert College is the oldest continuously operating American school outside the United States. (Note: A similar title is also claimed by the American College of Sofia (ACS), founded in 1860. The ACS was founded in Plovdiv, moved to Samokov in 1871, and then to Sofia in 1926. The school was closed for a 50-year span between 1942 and 1992. In contrast, Robert College operated consistently from 1863 onwards, in two different campuses in Istanbul. Robert College is therefore the longest continuously operating American school outside the US, but the American College of Sofia is the oldest one.)

The school is situated in a 265-acre (107 ha) wooded campus on the European side of Istanbul in the Beşiktaş district, with the historic Arnavutköy neighborhood to the east and the upscale Ulus neighborhood to the west.

== History ==
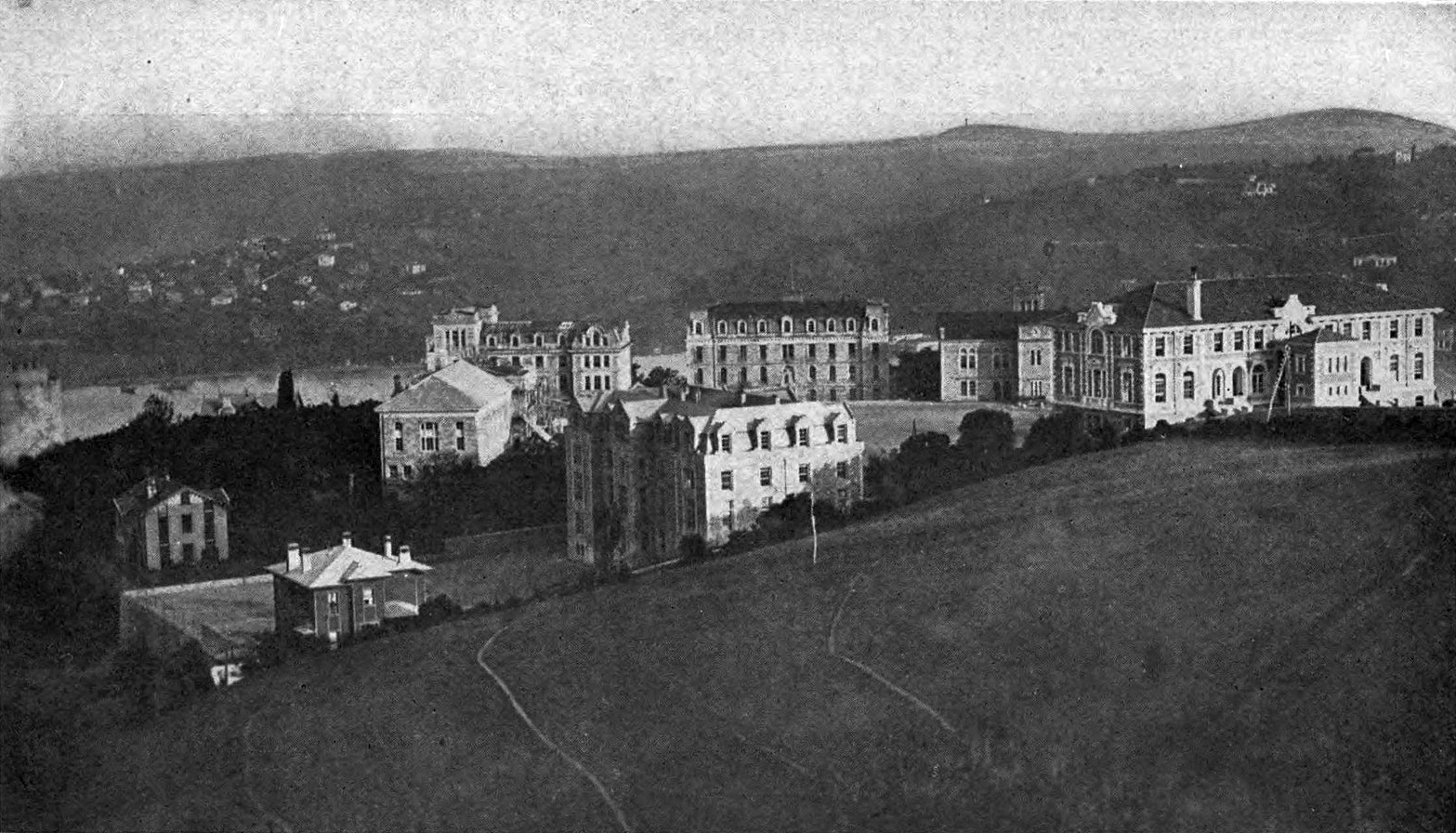
Picture of the college printed in Ambassador Morgenthau's Story (1918)

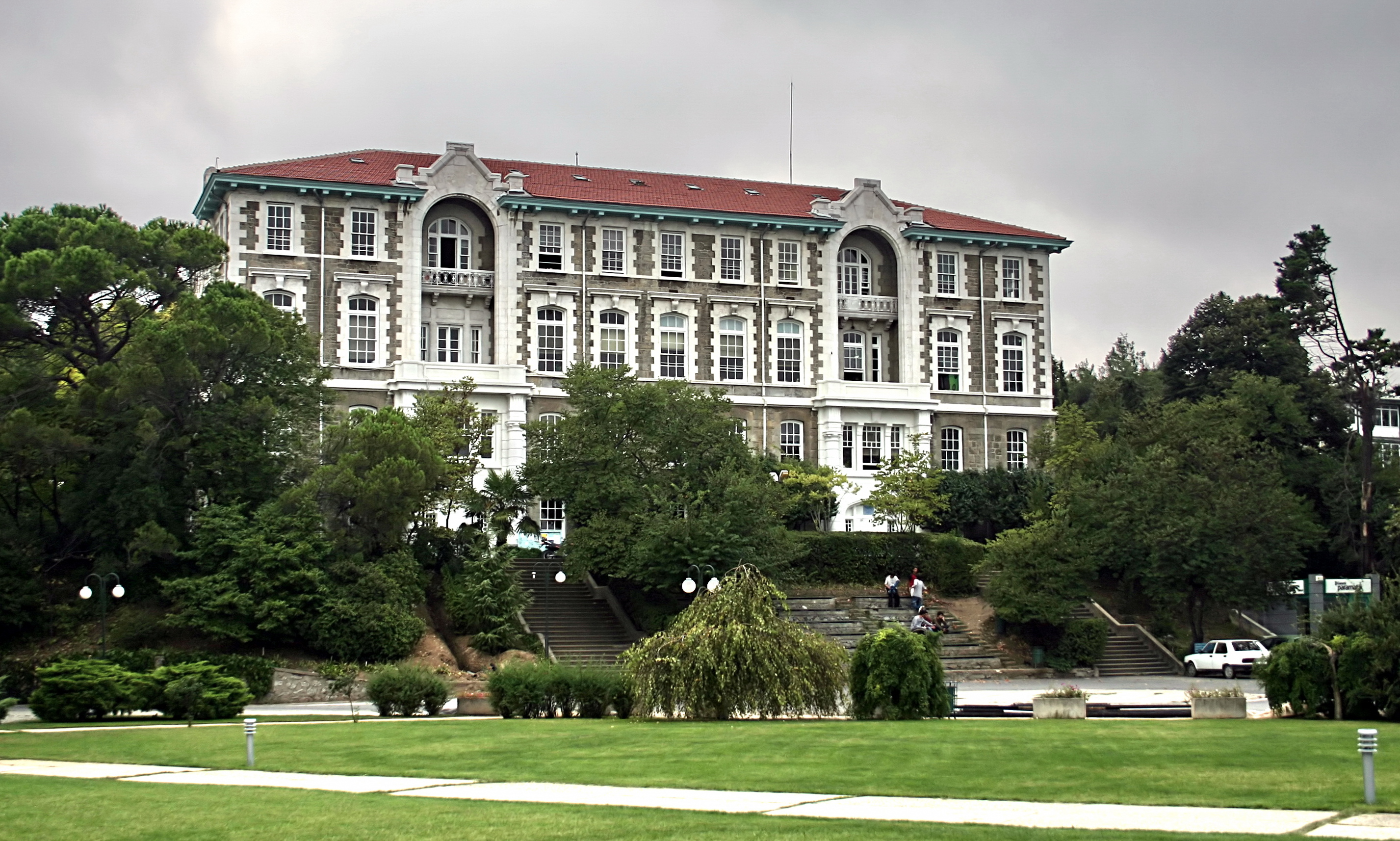
Anderson Hall, currently the Faculty of Arts & Sciences at Boğaziçi University

In 1863, Robert College was founded in Bebek by Christopher Robert, a wealthy American philanthropist, and Cyrus Hamlin, a missionary devoted to education. Six years after its foundation, with the permission (Ottoman Turkish: irade) of the Ottoman Sultan, the first campus (currently housing Boğaziçi University) was built in Bebek at the ridge of the Rumeli Castle. At the time, the school was very close to a Bektashi tekke, whose leaders maintained an excellent relationship with the Congregational and Presbyterian founders of Robert College, according to Friedrich Schrader, a German lecturer at Robert College during the 1890s. Hamlin, who became the first president of Robert College, was preoccupied with the construction of the campus such that George Washburn acted as the de facto head of the college from 1871 onwards. In 1877, he was officially named president by the trustees. During his tenure between 1877 and 1903, Washburn "gradually assembled a faculty of distinguished scholars who firmly established the college's academic reputation."

Christopher Robert died in 1878, leaving a significant portion of his wealth to the college. In that same year, a college catalog was compiled, providing general information and an outline of the courses of study. Defining the aims of the college, the catalog stated: "The object of the College is to give to its students, without distinction of race or religion, a thorough educational equal in all respects to that obtained at a first-class American college and based upon the same general principles."

After Washburn, Robert College was administrated by Caleb Gates (1903–1932). During his presidency, the student body of the school underwent a major demographic transition; whereas the student body previously consisted of Bulgarian, Romanian, and other Christian minorities in the Ottoman Empire, the Young Turks' liberalization of policies directed towards foreign schools and an increasing demand amongst Turks for a western education resulted in considerable numbers of Turkish students enrolling. Founded at the time of the Ottoman Empire as an institution of higher learning serving the Christian minorities of the Empire as well as foreigners living in Constantinople, the school adopted a strictly secular educational model in accordance with the republican principles of Turkey in 1923. Robert College, at various points of its existence, had junior high school, high school, and university sections under the names Robert Academy, Robert Yüksek and American College for Girls. Since 1971, the current-day Robert College has functioned only as a "high school" (more comparable to the French lycée in academic rigor) on its Arnavutköy campus (formerly the campus of American College for Girls), yet it retains the title of "College". The Bebek campus and academic staff were turned over to the Republic of Turkey for use as a public university named Boğaziçi University, the renamed continuation of Robert College's university section.

=== Major events ===
- 1863, September 16: Robert College opened with 31 students at Bebek Seminary School.
- 1912: The School of Engineering at Robert College was established, beginning with Civil Engineering.
- 1922: President Caleb Gates and Hüseyin Pektaş (the first Muslim graduate and then vice-president of the college) attended the Conference of Lausanne representing foreign educational institutions in the Ottoman Empire.
- 1932: With Paul Monroe, the joint presidency system was adopted by Robert College (RC) and the American College for Girls (ACG). Robert Academy was the preparatory school for Robert College, which had a reputable engineering school. Instruction was bilingual, in Turkish and English.
- 1934: The School of Engineering at Robert College was expanded with the programs of Civil Engineering, Mechanical Engineering, Electrical Engineering and Mining Engineering.
- 1957: Robert College was granted permission to become an institution of higher learning by the Republic of Turkey with the name Robert Koleji Yüksek Okulu (Higher Education School of Robert College) and was given the status of a university.
- 1961: Universities in Turkey were granted autonomy with Article 120 of the Turkish Constitution of 1961. All undergraduate degree programs at Robert College became 4-year bachelor's degree programs in 1961, including those which were previously offered as 2-year programs.
- 1971: Following the 1971 Turkish military memorandum, a law was passed for the nationalization or closure of private higher education institutions in Turkey which offered college degree programs. This led to the organizational restructuring of Robert College in Istanbul and to the closure of the Theological School of Halki in Heybeliada (the latter refused the Turkish Ministry of National Education's proposal of being attached to the Faculty of Theology at Istanbul University). As a result, the college section (Robert Koleji Yüksek Okulu), which offered 4-year bachelor's degree programs (e.g. the programs of the School of Engineering) and master's degree programs (e.g. in Industrial Engineering), was officially closed on 18 May 1971, and was nationalized and reorganized as Boğaziçi University, which took over its buildings. The high school section of Robert College, formerly named Robert Academy (RA), continues to operate as an American high school, with the Turkish name Robert Kolej referring mainly to the still active high school section since 1971. The merger of the American College for Girls and Robert Academy as a co-educational private institution with junior high and high schools, on the Arnavutköy campus, was officially confirmed in September 1971. Robert College's Bebek campus was donated to the Republic of Turkey. Boğaziçi University was established as a public university on this land. The autonomy of the universities in Turkey, granted with Article 120 of the Turkish Constitution of 1961, was suspended in 1971 and annulled with the Higher Education Law numbered 2547 (Turkish: 2547 sayılı Yükseköğretim Kanunu) which became effective on 6 November 1981. Since then, the Council of Higher Education is responsible for supervising the universities in Turkey, in a capacity defined by Article 130 of the Turkish Constitution of 1982.
- 1998: With the adoption of a law calling for eight years of uninterrupted primary education in Turkey (junior high school would now be a part of primary education), the school stopped accepting students to its junior high school section.
- 2004: The last junior high school students graduated and the school's junior high school section was officially closed. Now, Robert College has Prep, 9th, 10th, 11th, 12th grades, and accepts students who have finished compulsory primary education of eight years.

=== List of presidents and heads ===
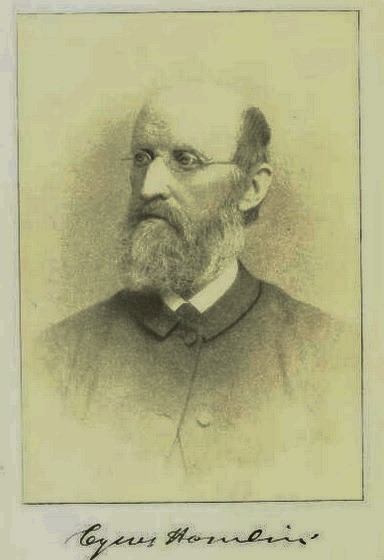
Cyrus Hamlin, co-founder and first headmaster of Robert College

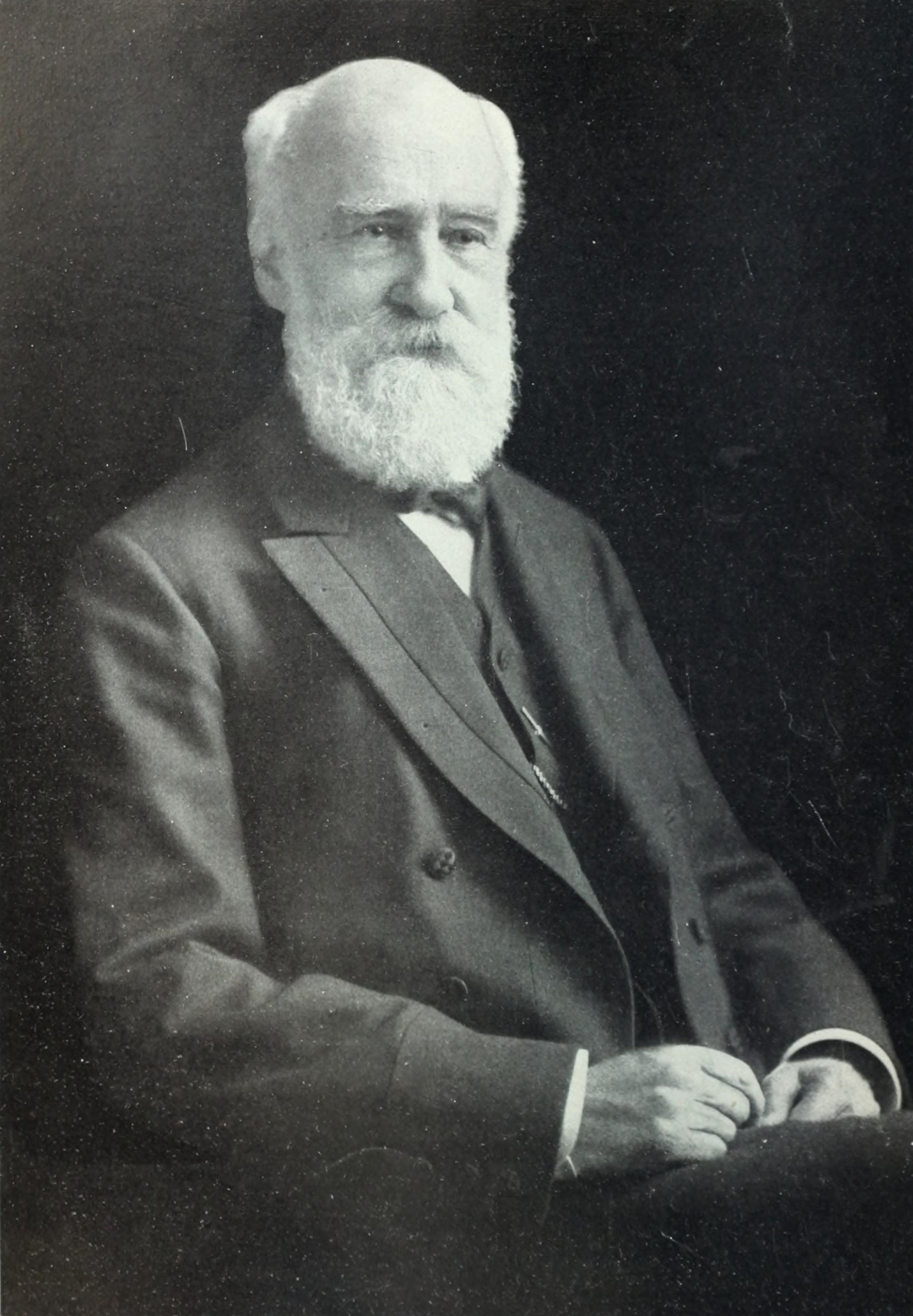
George Washburn, second headmaster of Robert College

Heads of Robert College
Head	Years of service
Cyrus Hamlin	1863–1877
George Washburn	1877–1903
Caleb Frank Gates	1903–1932
Paul Monroe	1932–1935
Walter Livingston Wright	1935–1943
Harold Lorain Scott (acting president)	1943–1944
Floyd Henson Black	1944–1955
Duncan Smith Ballantine	1955–1961
Harold Locke Hazen (acting president)	1961
Patrick Murphy Malin	1962–1964
James L. Brainerd (acting president)	1965
Dwight James Simpson	1965–1967
Howard P. Hall (acting president)	1967–1968
John Scott Everton	1968–1971
John Clay Chalfant	1971–1977
James Richard Maggart	1977–1981
Elizabeth Dabanovitch (acting head)	1981–1982
Alan Donn Kesselheim	1982–1984
Margaret A. Johnson	1984–1988
Harry A. Dawe	1988–1992
Benjamin D. Williams III (interim head)	1992–1993
Christopher Wadsworth	1993–2001
Livingston Merchant	2001–2005
John Russell Chandler	2005–2012
Anthony Jones	2012–2015
Charles H. Skipper	2015–2019
Adam Oliver	2019–2025
Whitman Shepard	2025–2027
Stephen Murray	2027–

== Academics ==
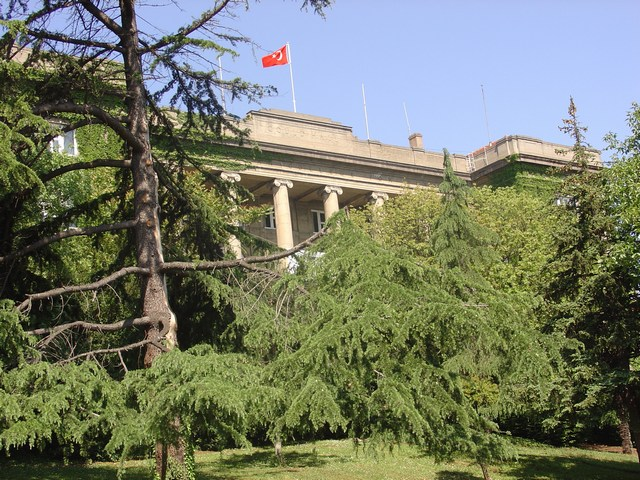
Robert College Gould Hall

As of 1999, as per Turkish Ministry of National Education (MEB) regulations, Turkish is the instructional language of history and social studies classes.

=== Students ===
Robert College accepts 180 to 220 students each year, who have scored within the top 0.2 percentile in a nationwide examination (LGS), which every Turkish student must take in order to study in a high school (secondary education) after they complete their primary education. The school has around 1000 students each academic year.

In the 1998–1999 academic year there were 942 students, with 99% having Turkish nationality.

Circa 1904, the school had about 300 students, with boarding space for about 200. Lucy Mary Jane Garnett wrote in the 1904 work Turkish Life in Town and Country that at that time most of the students were Christian as the college had a requirement for students to attend Christian Sunday church services and chapel services, and "it would be unsafe for any professed Moslem to become either a resident or a daily student" since the Ottoman government would take a dim view of a Muslim going to chapel. In 1904, Greek students made up the majority and other students included significant numbers of Armenians and Bulgarians.

=== Faculty and staff ===
The faculty have an average of 20 years of teaching experience and the majority have either Turkish or United States citizenship. The school currently has faculty who are 50% Turkish, and 48% native English speakers (including faculty from English-speaking countries other than the United States). Sixty percent of the full-time faculty hold master's degrees or higher.

As of 1999 there were 102 teachers, with 45% being Turkish and 32% being American. Of the teachers, eight were part-time. The school's guidance counselors, as of that year, were English-speaking Turkish citizens.

As of 1999, as per Turkish Ministry of National Education regulations, the school employs only Turkish citizens to teach history and social studies classes.

As of 1999, the school pays its foreign employees funds so that their children may attend Istanbul International Community School. If an employee chooses another school, Robert College will pay an equivalent amount.

In 1904, the faculty included Americans, Turks, Armenians, Bulgarians, and Greeks.

Robert College Plateau

=== Curriculum ===
Robert College is a five-year high school, with the first year (Prep) being the English immersion year that prepares students for rigorous curriculum, which is mostly in English. English is the language of instruction used in Science, Mathematics, Literature, Physical Education, Art and Music courses. Turkish is the required language of instruction in social sciences and Turkish language/literature.

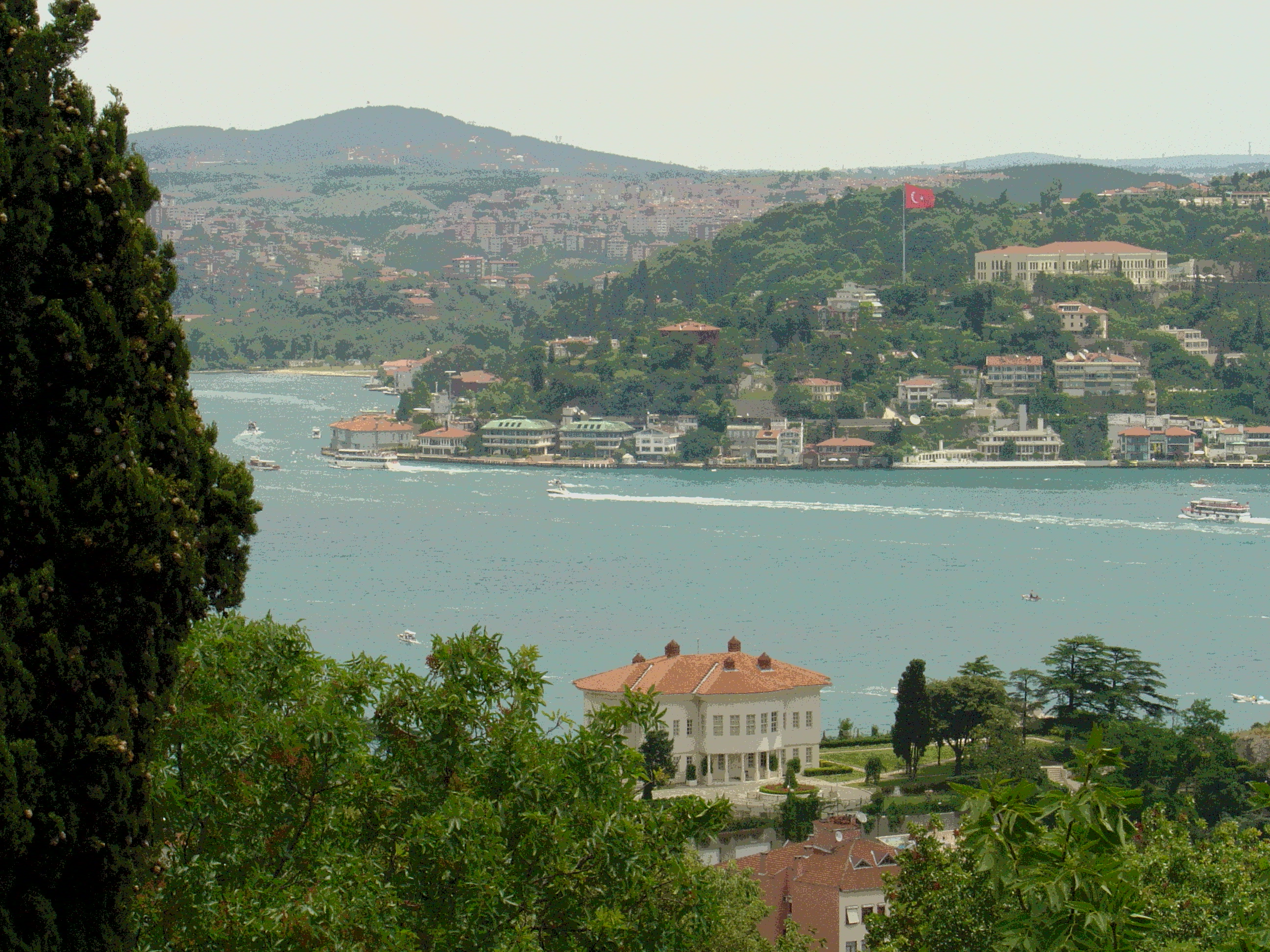
A view of the Bosphorus from Robert College Plateau

=== Higher education ===
Robert College graduates traditionally continue their education in the United States or Turkey, though in recent years the number of students studying in Canada and the United Kingdom increased. Every year, approximately 50–60 percent of the graduating class choose to study abroad, while those wishing to study in Turkey get placed in a university based on their score on the Core Proficiency Test–Advanced Proficiency Test (TYT-AYT). In 2006, Robert College ranked first in all three sections of ÖSS, a formerly-administered Student Selection and Placement System test, among private high schools in Turkey, with 76 out of 132 students taking the exam scoring in the top 0.3% (top 5000). Out of the 104 students who chose to study in Turkey, 29 were admitted to Boğaziçi University, which is one of the highest ranking schools in Turkey. 56 students chose to continue their education abroad and 36% of these students are attending Ivy League colleges. In 2011, Robert College placed 123 graduates in Turkish universities, 21 of them, 40%, in Boğaziçi University. Another 53 planned to study abroad, 8 (15%) in the Ivy League. Of the 79 students who had applied abroad, 75 were offered admission.

== Co-curricular activities ==
Robert College has about 100 student activity clubs as of 2015. Robert College introduced basketball to the Ottoman Empire in 1907. The first Student Council in Ottoman Empire was also formed in 1908 in Robert College.

=== Student Council ===
Student Council is formed of a group of annually elected student governors and a faculty advisor. The elected body is proportional with class size. As well as class representatives, the president, the vice president, the secretary and the treasurer are elected after a period of campaigning. Student Council is responsible for facilitating communications between students, faculty and administration, as well as organizing social activities and fundraising for clubs. Student Council also organizes the largest and oldest high school festival, Fine Arts Festival, in Turkey. The President of the Student Council, representing the student body, makes a speech during the opening, closing, and graduation ceremonies.

=== Publications ===
RC Reviews March 2005 Issue

==== English ====
- Bosphorus Chronicle: The school's newspaper published quarterly (first published in 1959).
- Record: The Yearbook.
- Kaleidoscope: The English literature magazine.

==== Turkish ====
- Köprü (The Bridge): The school's Turkish newspaper, published bimonthly (first published in January 2009).
- Martı (Seagull): Turkish literature journal.
- Oda (Room): Turkish literature journal publishing poems, stories and photos submitted by students.
- Tarih (History): The History Club's annual publication.
- Sinek (Fly): The Film Review Club's annual publication.

The Robert College Basketball Team on their way to the championship in the Traditional FMV Işık Schools Tournament.

=== Conferences and festivals ===
==== Fine Arts Festival (FAF) ====
The Fine Arts Festival is the largest secondary school festival in Turkey. It has been held annually since 1982 by the Robert College Student Council. Each year, more than 2,000 people attend the festival, which is traditionally held in May. The festival is a big event in which many student groups can perform on stage. There are various art exhibitions and dance shows that also take place. Student Council members visit other high schools in Istanbul and advertise for this event. At the end of the festival, a well-known artist or band typically performs on stage. Most of the revenues used to fund this event are raised through food and ticket sales. Food vendors are usually selected by Student Council members and consist of restaurants close to Robert College such as "kumpir" sellers in Ortaköy. This promotes the tight-knit Robert College community spirit.

==== International Istanbul Youth Forum (IYF) ====
The International Istanbul Youth Forum is an annually held conference at Robert College. It has been organized every year since 2006 with participants from numerous European countries. Each year, more than 150 participants from all over Europe gather at the RC campus. The conference is organized by the Robert College European Youth Club.

==== Ethics Forum ====
Robert College Ethical Values Club organizes an ethics case study contest at national level among high school students, following their forum. The results are announced at the Ethics Conference near the end of the year. Both events attract more than twenty public and private schools from around Turkey.

==== Robert College International Model United Nations (RCIMUN) ====
Robert College International Model United Nations (RCIMUN) is a THIMUN-affiliated Model United Nations conference organized annually by the Robert College Model United Nations Club (RCMUN) since 2006. The conference includes four General Assembly committees, those being the Political, Human Rights, Environment, and Disarmament Committees, a Special Conference committee, the Security Council of UN, an Advisory Panel, ECOSOC, Specialized Agencies (RCSA), the equivalent of two intertwined historical committees which simulate a single historical event, a separate Historical Security Council, as well as a simulation of the International Criminal Court. Approximately 750 students, of which about 42% were from international schools attended the 2012 conference.

==== Istanbul Gençlik Forumu (IGF) ====
Istanbul Gençlik Forumu is a national conference where representatives from over 30 high schools from different regions come together to discuss issues regarding the future of Turkey. In 2008, the fifth IGF welcomed over 250 participants. Discussions about international affairs are held in Turkish and each committee is responsible for writing a resolution. Then, at the General Assembly, each resolution is discussed and voted on. It is also the National Selection Conference of EYP Turkey, which is also recognized by the international office of European Youth Parliament. The conference is held annually and is organized by the Robert College European Youth Club.

==== Turkish Theater Festival (TIFES) ====
Organized by the Robert College Theater Club, TIFES is one of the major theatrical events at high school level in Turkey. The festival takes place in Robert College campus during the first week of June. Numerous plays are put on stage during the week in Suna Kıraç Hall and famous actors, actresses and playwrights give talks on topics related to theatrical arts.

==== Junior Achievement Robert College Conference (JARC) ====
Robert College Junior Achievement Club is hosting this event. About 300 Junior Achievement students from all over Turkey meet each other and share their experiences with others and entrepreneurs and artists related to the topics like Risk (2010), Alternative Careers (2009), Creating a Brand (2008).

==== Eurasian Schools Debating Championship (ESDC) ====
The Eurasian Schools Debating Championship (ESDC) is an annually organized, WSDC-style debating tournament, that welcomes high school students representing a wide range of countries. While being the only student-run, high school level debating organization, it has gained a reputation as one of the best WSDC-style tournaments worldwide. With the participation of experienced judges, numerous national teams and outstanding debaters across the globe, it happened to be among the most popular debating organizations. In 2021, the organization rocketed with over 400 debaters and 98 teams from 20 countries.

== Campus ==
The 65-acre (260,000 m^{2}) wooded campus overlooking the Bosphorus, originally designed by Charles H. Rutan of Shepley, Rutan and Coolidge, is home to five neoclassical buildings as well as three brutalist ones, centennial trees and a rich fauna, among which the Bosphorus Beetle, an endemic species to this campus, could be counted.

=== Major buildings ===
==== Gould Hall ====
Aerial view of Robert College Gould Hall

The oldest educational building on the campus, Gould Hall (/ɡuːld/) is a gift from Helen Gould Shepard, daughter of the famous 19th century Wall Street financier Jay Gould. She donated US$150,000 for the construction, which began in 1911 and was completed in 1914. The front and back entrances to the building lead to Marble Hall, named such due to the abundant usage of marble in its decor. Marble Hall acts as a lobby for the building, and also houses part of the school's archeological collection. The Faculty Parlor, formerly used as the teachers' room, and the Conference Room, are both adjacent to and accessible from Marble Hall. Gould Hall also houses administrative offices, classrooms, the İbrahim Bodur library, the Heritage Room, and the RC Commons area, (Note: Colloquially referred to as the canteen (Turkish: kantin).) as well as the Turkish Literature and Social Sciences Departments, and the English Department Heads office. The building, particularly with its large ionic columns, is the de facto symbol of the school. Ivies and wisteria plants surround the building's walls. On its front entablature, the words "American College for Girls" and "Gould Hall" are visible. The cornerstone of the building, set on November 9, 1911, by then-United States Ambassador to the Ottoman Empire, William Woodville Rockhill, contains a time capsule. The inscription "AD MDCCCCXI", denoting the year of the capsule's burial in Roman numerals, is displayed on the South Wing of the front façade.

==== Mitchell Hall ====
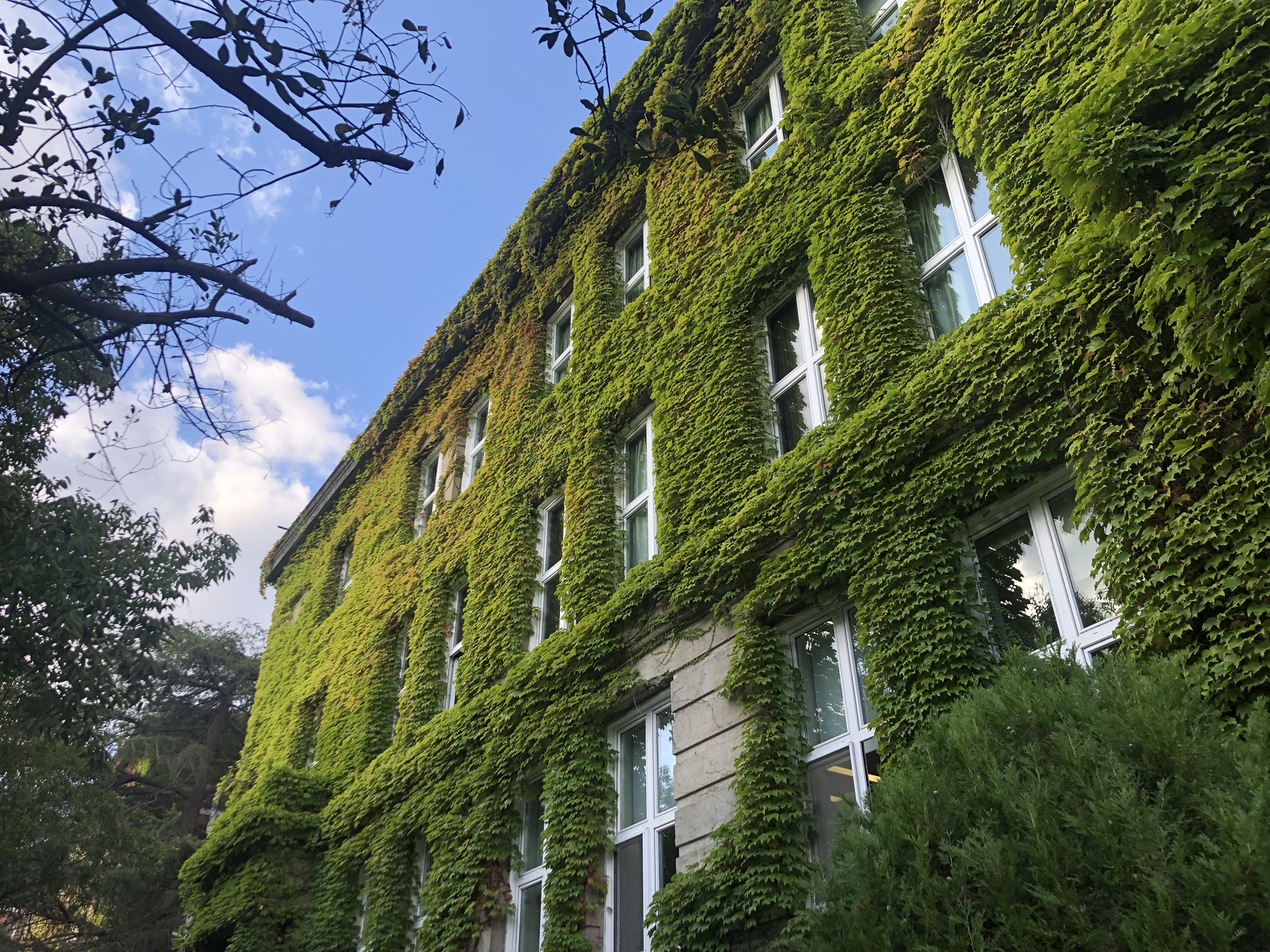
Mitchell Hall in summer, covered in ivy.

Originally home to the school kitchens and dining room, the building was a gift from Miss Olivia E. Phelps Stokes, who donated US$100,000. A modest woman, she asked for the building to be named in memory of her friend, Sarah Lindlay Mitchell. Today, the building houses classrooms used primarily for mathematics lessons, the Math Department, the Sait Halman Computer Center, the teachers' room, the audio-visual center, two Multimedia Rooms (MMRs), and a small English department office. The top floor, M400, is used for examinations, minor conferences, and weekly club sessions.

==== Woods Hall ====
Completed in 1914, the building was a partial gift from Mrs. Henry Woods of Boston, who donated US$58,000, with Helen Gould Shepard supplying the remaining US$25,000 required. It was used as a Science Building until 1990, and today is home to classrooms used primarily for English lessons, two English department offices, and two college counselling offices.

==== Sage Hall ====
A gift from Mrs. Margaret Olivia Sage, widow of Russell Sage, a famous 19th century financier and associate of Jay Gould, Sage Hall is one of the few buildings still used for its original purpose. A philanthropist, she donated US$100,000 for the building, built as a dormitory. Today, the building houses the girls' dormitories, infirmary, art studios and a darkroom.

==== Bingham Hall ====
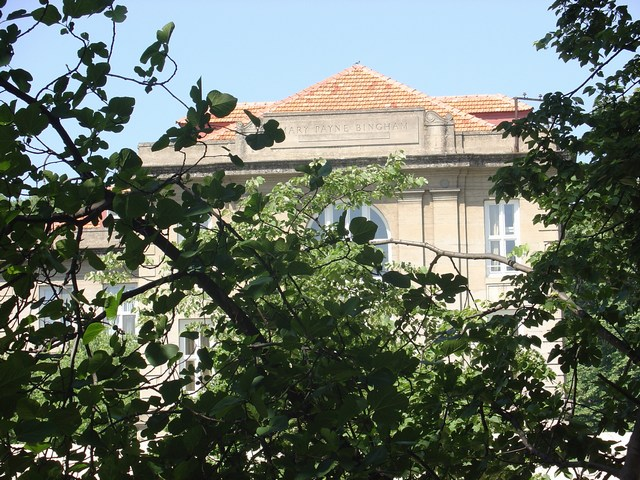
Bingham Hall

Originally built as a medical school building, financed by William Bingham in memory of his mother, Mary Payne Bingham, the building housed the junior high school section from 1925 to 1992. Today, it is home to the boys' dormitories, as well as a secondary theater room, and business and administrative offices. A plaque commemorating the construction of the building, which reads "Mary Payne Bingham Hall, erected in honor of Mary Payne Bingham by her son William Bingham 2nd", is visible above the front entrance.

==== Feyyaz Berker Hall ====
Feyyaz Berker Hall, colloquially referred to as "Feyyaz", (Note: Amongst Robert College students, "Feyyaz" is also used as a metonymy for natural science courses.) today houses the science labs and classrooms, as well as the Science Department. The building was completed in 1990, and named after its largest donor, leading Turkish businessman and Robert College trustee, Feyyaz Berker (Robert College Eng '46 alumnus). The front of the building has arched windows, which mimic the façade of Gould Hall. Contents of the Biology Museum, which has one of the rarest collections in Turkey, are scattered across the second and third floors of the building. Feyyaz Berker Hall is currently undergoing a renovation which started in the 2026 summer break. The renovation was said to be completed by September 7th (which is when the 2026-2027 academic year started). While the 2nd and 3rd floors are operational and host science classes, due to some delays the 1st and 4th floors still remain closed for students to this day. Current Robert College Head Whitman Shepard said the building will be fully opened by September 21st during the last "Community Announcements" which take place at the start and end of every week.

==== Suna Kıraç Hall ====
A state-of-the-art theater building completed in 1990, including a large stage, make-up rooms, modern sound and lighting system and seating for 512 people, was named after its largest donor Suna Kıraç (American College for Girls '60 alumnus), a leading Turkish businesswoman and Robert College Trustee. Its basement houses the music department and several music rooms.

Students in the forum

==== Nejat Eczacıbaşı Hall ====
The modern school gymnasium was opened in 1990 and named after its largest donor, prominent Turkish bio-chemist and businessman Dr. Nejat Eczacıbaşı (Robert College '32 alumnus). Its basement houses the Multi-Purpose Room (MPR), P.E. department offices, and the AR-VR lab, located in the area where Cep (Turkish for "Pocket"), a student lounge area used to be in.

=== İbrahim Bodur Library ===
When founded in 1863, Robert College had four students. A sum of $2,120 had been allocated to the library, and Harvard University had donated 200 volumes for the opening of the library. During the 1950s and '60s, the college had one of the largest collections in Turkey. (In 1957: 111,598 books and 214 periodicals; the American College for Girls Library 27,163 books and 108 periodicals, according to the Turkiye Kütüphaneleri Rehberi (Turkish Libraries Guide) published by the Turkish National Library that year. After the foundation of Boğaziçi University, the college donated most of its collections to the newly founded university. Today, Robert College has a print collection of approximately 40,000 resources in both Turkish and English. It also has an expanding collection of eBooks, eMagazines and databases that can be accessed both on and off campus. The library went through an extensive renovation in 2014 and occupies an area of 1034 square meters, with a seating capacity of 290 people on the second and third floors of Gould Hall.

=== Other buildings and facilities ===
Aerial view of Robert College

- The Rodney B. Wagner Memorial Maze
- Murat Karamancı Student Center (MKSC)
- Dave Phillips Field
- Konak Terrace
- Tennis courts
- Basketball courts
- Faculty housing (Barton House, White House, Blue House, Yalı, Guest House, and numerous other houses dispersed on campus)
- Green Tower
- The Bridge and Security
- Forum

== Tuition and finances ==
Robert College's tuition fees, for the 2020–2021 academic year, are:

Day Student	Boarder (5 days)	Boarder (7 days)
TRY 109,000	TRY 149,300	TRY 167,770
US$14,750	US$20,235	US$22,735

Tuition fees are adjusted each year according to the inflation rates in a limited range set by the Ministry of National Education (MEB).

Robert College has consistently ranked as the most expensive high school in Turkey by tuition. According to school data, 26% of students received some form of financial aid for the 2019–2020 academic year.

Robert College files its taxes in New York State through two separate 501(c)(3) tax-exempt non-profit organizations: the Trustees of Robert College of Istanbul, tax-exempt since December 1947, and the Robert College Foundation, tax-exempt since May 2000. The data is publicly available on ProPublica. As of Fiscal Year 2017, the two organizations reported a combined revenue of 28.7 million USD.

Tuition fees and donations constitute a significant majority of the school's income. In 2019, income from tuition fees covered 55% of the school's expenses, with most of the remainder being supplied by donations. A majority of donors are alumni of the school, though financial institutions and corporations have donated as well.

== Controversy ==
=== Pervaneler ===
Müfide Ferid Tek, a Pan-Turkist author, wrote Pervaneler, a novel criticizing the foreign, anti-Turkish nature of the American College for Girls. Published in 1924, a year after the declaration of the Turkish Republic, the novel revolves around "Byzantium College" (Turkish: Bizans Kolej), a fictionalized account of the American College for Girls. The story includes Leman, a young Turkish Muslim woman attending Byzantium College. There, she befriends two Turkish girls, Nesime and Bahire. Nesime is the daughter of a famous Mevlevi Sheik, Amir Çelebi. Her education at Byzantium College alienates her from her Turkish and Muslim identities, leading her to convert to Protestantism to migrate to the United States. Bahire is a woman who "dresses like a man", rejects her gender roles, and is captivated by the western feminist movement. She also moves to the United States to attend feminist lectures. Leman, influenced by her friends, meets Jack Peterson, an American soldier in deployment, and escapes to the United States to marry him. These three figures represent cautionary tales for what the author believes will happen to Turkish youth in non-national educational institutions.

In the novel, Byzantium College is depicted as the principal institution corrupting young Turkish women—both a literal and figurative enclave of the foreign powers who invaded, but failed to hold Istanbul. According to the novel, the "Greek" and "foreign" architecture of the school—possibly a reference to the Greek ionic columns of Gould Hall—provides those visiting its campus a sense of entering into a separate country. Throughout the book, the school is described thus: "truly, this was the capital city of an American–Armenian country ... [it was] like a separate country within our motherland". Similar anti-Armenian sentiments dominate the novel: in the school's museum, artifacts by Armenian, Greek, Bulgarian, Serbian, and Russian peoples are displayed, whereas Turkish culture is denied.

=== 2014–2015 admittance scandal ===
In the 2014–2015 academic year, a student was admitted to Robert College with a lower high school entry exam score than was required. The admitted student was the twin sister of another student who had gained admission to Robert College with her exam score. On 25 March 2015, Hürriyet reported that the student was admitted to Robert College with the instruction of the Ministry of National Education (MEB). Responding to reports by the media of unfair conduct, the headmaster at the time, Anthony Jones, stated in a letter that "the numerous administrative objections made to [the MEB ruling] by our school have been denied, and we are by law obliged to abide by this ruling."

It was later reported that the student in question could not attend lessons due to "a literal meat shield of students" blocking her, and that she dropped out shortly thereafter.

=== Yeni Akit ===
A government-aligned Islamist newspaper and website, Yeni Akit has published three articles on Robert College since 2017. The first, entitled "Heresy in Robert College" (Turkish: "Robert Koleji'nde Sapkınlık") was an attack on the school's LGBTQ week. Authored by Faruk Arslan, the homophobic article characterized homosexuality as a "disease", with the subheading "the American Robert College joined the choir of heretics representing the disease of homosexuality as a normal human condition."

In 2018, Faruk Arslan published another article, entitled "The Headscarf Hate of Robert College" ("Robert Koleji'nin Başörtü Düşmanlığı"), claiming that Islamic headscarfs were banned by the school dress code. In reality, religious headscarfs are allowed in Robert College.

Another article in 2018 by the same author questioned the source of Robert College's funding. In "Where Did Robert College's 900 Trillion [Million] Come From, Where is it Going?" ("Robert Koleji'ne 900 Trilyon Nereden Geldi, Nereye Gidiyor?"), a conspiracy theory surrounding Robert College's finances is concocted. Arslan claims that the 137 million dollars that Robert College acquired within a 5-year span is a result of "the exploitation of Turkey's resources", and is being used for "US interests". In reality, Robert College raises funds through tuition and voluntary donations by its alumni. A 501(c)(3) tax-exempt non-profit organization, Robert College files its taxes in New York, and its expenditures are publicly available.

== Notable alumni ==
Since the Ottoman period, Robert College alumni have played a leading role in numerous fields including the arts, academia, science, engineering, business, civil society and government administration. Garnett stated in her 1904 publication that "since its foundation forty years ago many of its graduates have attained to high positions in the Governments of the Balkan principalities, and otherwise distinguished themselves." Three Robert College graduates were the representatives of their countries in the founding meeting of the United Nations held in San Francisco in March 1945: Nur al-Din Kahala for Syria, Hamiz Atif Kuyucak for Turkey and Dr. Shafaq for Iran.

In 1990, three alumni, Nejat Eczacıbaşı, Suna Kıraç and Feyyaz Berker donated the necessary funds for the construction of the new buildings that are mentioned in the Buildings section. An annual giving campaign raises funds for the school, as costs cannot be met by tuition fees alone. The development office publishes the RC Quarterly, which reaches 10,000 Robert College alumni around the world online and by mail.

Bizimtepe, a cultural and recreational center next to the campus, is an affiliate of the Alumni Association.

== Notable former faculty ==
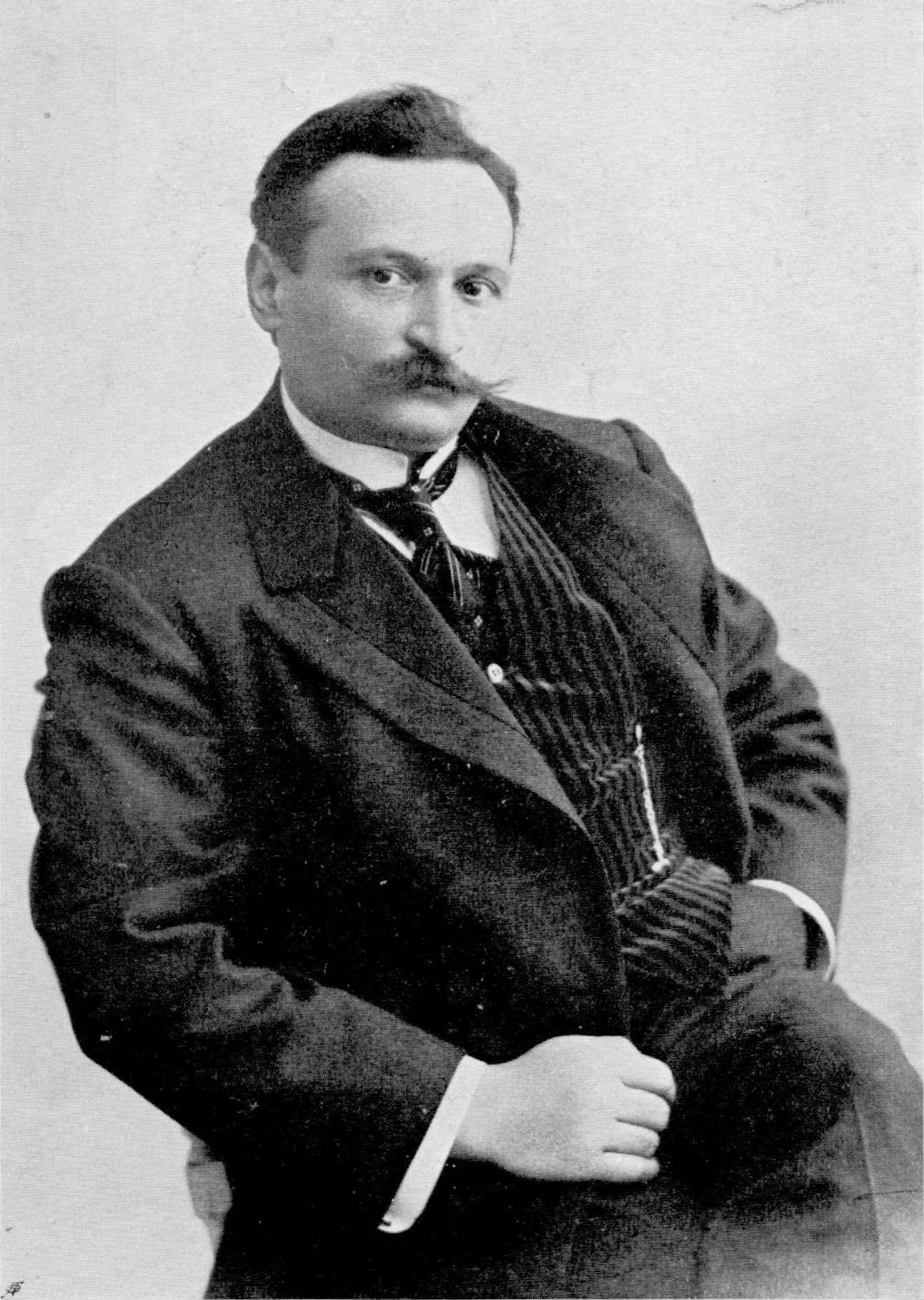
Tevfik Fikret, Ottoman-Turkish poet and educator

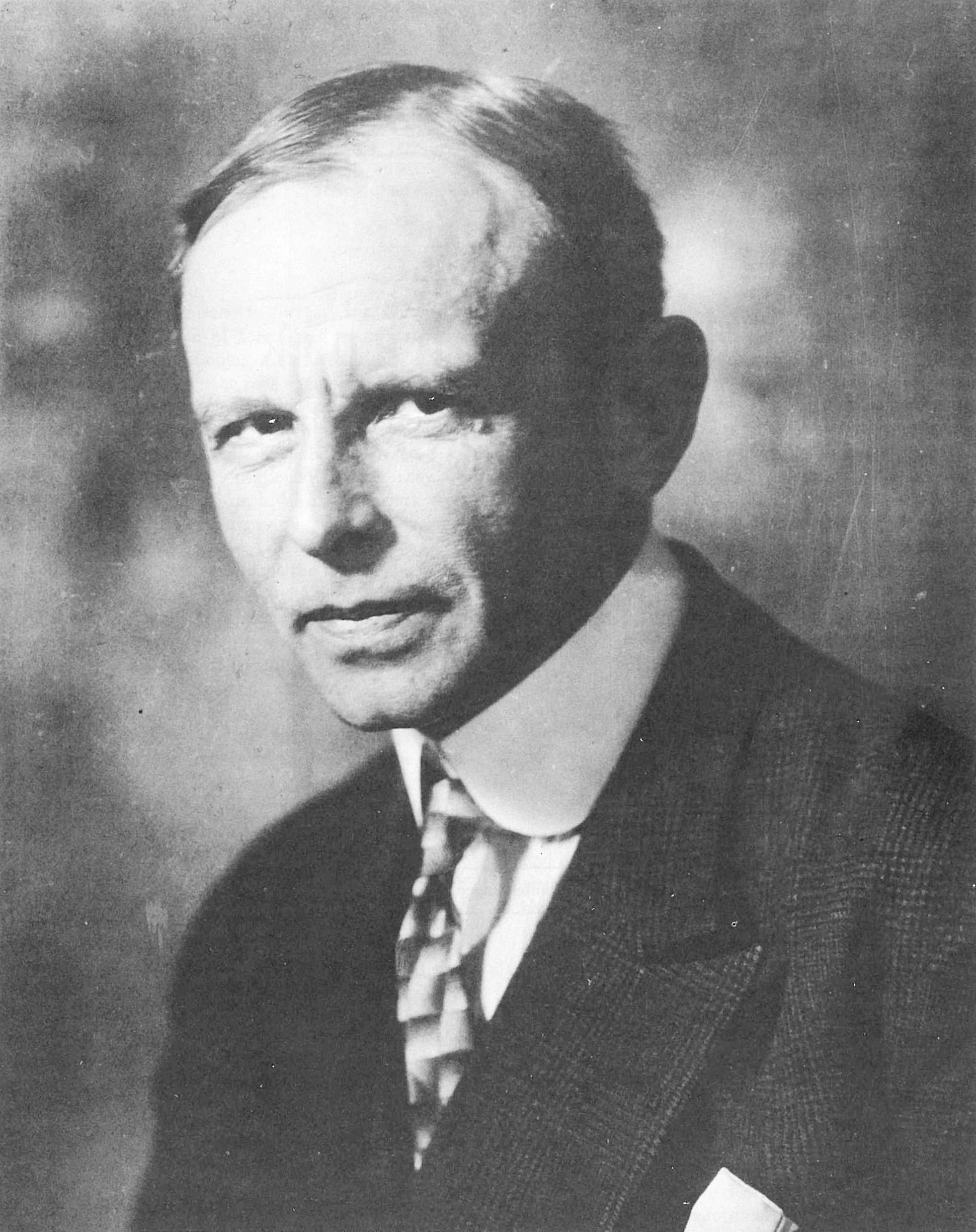
Karl von Terzaghi, Austrian geotechnical engineer

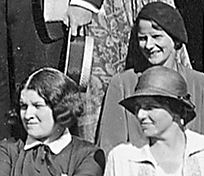
Frances Harshbarger, American mathematician

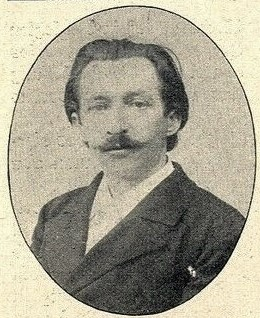
Paul Lange, German conductor of the Ottoman Empire's Royal Orchestra

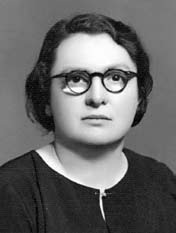
Mebrure Gönenç, Turkish educator and politician

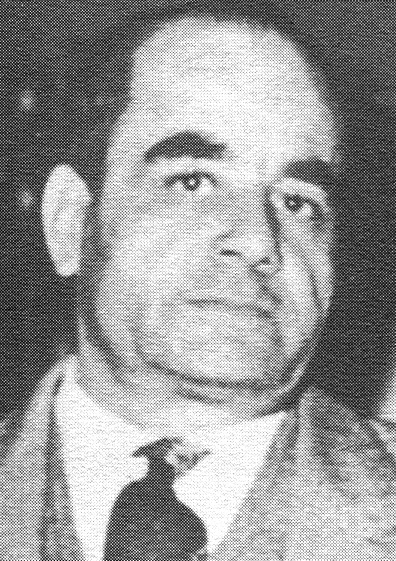
Behçet Kemal Çağlar, Turkish poet

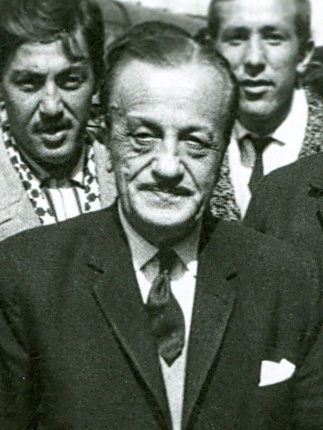
Necip Fazıl Kısakürek, Turkish poet
- Tevfik Fikret, Turkish poet, leader of the Servet-i Fünûn movement, founder of the modern school of Turkish poetry
- Cahit Arf, Turkish mathematician
- Hagop Vahram Çerçiyan, Turkish-Armenian calligrapher and creator of Atatürk's signature
- Calouste Gulbenkian, Ottoman-Armenian entrepreneur and art collector
- Behçet Kemal Çağlar, Turkish poet
- Stanwood Cobb, American educator and author, founder of the Progressive Education Association
- John Bowen Coburn, American bishop of the Episcopal Diocese of Massachusetts from 1976 to 1986
- Paul H. Dike, American physicist
- John Freely, American physicist, teacher, and author
- Mebrure Gönenç, one of the first female members of the Turkish Parliament (alumna of the American College of Girls)
- Dimitri Gutas, American academic and professor of Arabic and Islamic studies at Yale University, Arabist and Hellenist specialized in medieval Islamic philosophy
- Frances Harshbarger, one of the first female American mathematicians to receive a doctorate
- Cem Karaca, Turkish musician
- Necip Fazıl Kısakürek, Turkish poet and author
- Paul Lange, German conductor of the Ottoman Empire's Royal Orchestra, musician, father of US conductor Hans Lange
- M. M. Mangasarian, Armenian-American atheist and secularist intellectual
- Arman Manukyan, Turkish-Armenian economist
- Mihri Pektaş, one of the first female members of the Turkish Parliament (alumna of the American College of Girls)
- Mary Paton Ramsay, Scottish literary scholar
- Friedrich Schrader, German journalist and author
- Stefan Panaretov, Bulgarian diplomat, Special Envoy and Minister Plenipotentiary of Bulgaria to the U.S. (1914–1925), Bulgarian representative to League of Nations
- Karl von Terzaghi, Austrian civil engineer, known as the "father of soil mechanics and geotechnical engineering"

== See also ==
- Boğaziçi University
- Istanbul International Community School, former sister school
- Education in the Ottoman Empire
- List of high schools in Turkey
- Koç School
- Üsküdar American Academy
