= Albion Independent School District =

School district in Oklahoma

Location
- Albion, Oklahoma United States

District information
- Type: Public

The Albion Independent School District is a school district based in Albion, Oklahoma, United States. It contains a single school serving Kindergarten-Grade 8.

== See also ==
List of school districts in Oklahoma
