= Cyrus Hamlin (missionary) =

American Congregational missionary

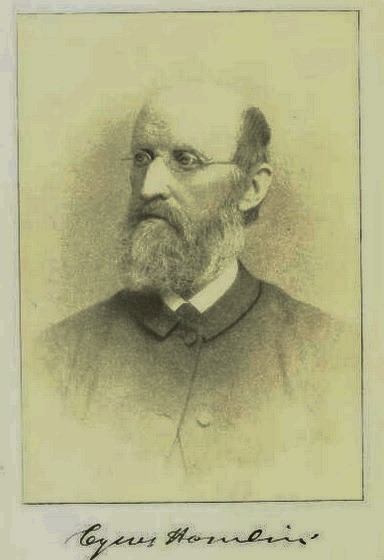
- Cyrus Hamlin, co-founder of Robert College

President of Middlebury College
- In office 1880–1885
- Preceded by: Calvin Butler Hulbert
- Succeeded by: Ezra Brainerd

Personal details
- Born: 5 January 1811 Waterford, Maine, US
- Died: 8 August 1900 (aged 89) Portland, Maine, US

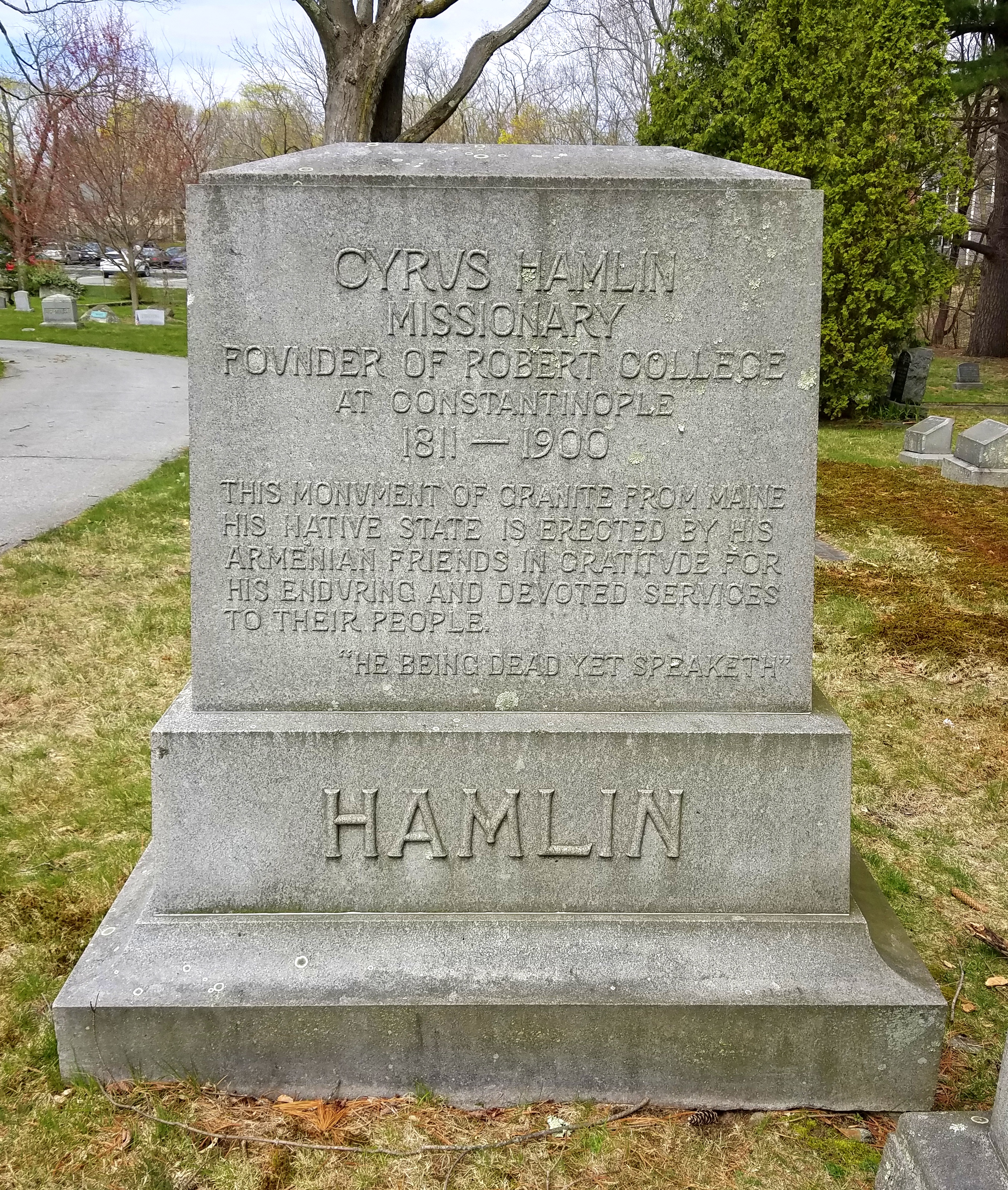
Cyrus Hamlin's grave in Munroe Cemetery, 2020

Cyrus Hamlin (January 5, 1811 – August 8, 1900) was an American Congregational missionary, co-founder of Robert College, and the father of A. D. F. Hamlin.

== Biography ==
Hamlin was born in Waterford, Maine and grew up on his family's farm estate. At sixteen, he entered an apprenticeship as a silversmith and jeweler in Portland, Maine before deciding to enter the ministry. He first attended Bridgton Academy before heading to college. He graduated from Bowdoin College in 1834 and from Bangor Theological Seminary in 1837. The Hamlins were a prominent nineteenth-century Maine family which also produced a Vice President of the United States (Hannibal Hamlin) and at least two Civil War generals, one of whom was also named Cyrus Hamlin.

He promptly left the United States in 1838 as a missionary under the American Board of Commissioners for Foreign Missions, arriving in the Ottoman Empire in January 1839. Hamlin helped found Bebek Seminary in 1840 as part of his outreach to Armenians. Hamlin established a workshop at Bebek to teach his students marketable trades, to help alleviate their severe poverty. From this workshop sprung a baking business, by which Hamlin became the primary provider of bread to the British Army hospital in Istanbul during the Crimean War. It was during this period that Hamlin became acquainted with Florence Nightingale. While the workshop and bakery were controversial to the American Board, the funds earned by Hamlin's enterprises helped build thirteen Protestant Armenian churches in Turkey.

In 1860, he began the work of establishing Robert College in Istanbul, Ottoman Empire. After years of unsuccessfully lobbying the Ottoman authorities for permission to build the school, Hamlin was eventually granted an imperial order granting permission for the school to be built and permitting it to be under American (United States) protection and fly the flag of the United States. The school opened its doors on May 15, 1863. Hamlin served as its president until an unfortunate conflict in 1876, which forced his return to the United States where he later served as professor of dogmatic theology at Bangor Theological Seminary.

He was elected president of Middlebury College in Vermont in 1880. His term was short, lasting only until 1885. However, Hamlin's guidance brought the College back from the brink of collapse and began a recovery process that would ultimately lead to unprecedented growth in the early years of the 20th Century. Hamlin resolved severe disciplinary issues inherited from his predecessor and personally contracted critical upgrades to the physical plant. However, the most significant event of Hamlin's administration—one that would prove key in maintaining Middlebury's stability later on—was the college's decision to accept women in 1883. Hamlin was seventy-four by 1885 when he unsurprisingly retired.

He published Among the Turks (1878) and My Life and Times (1893). Hamlin Hall at Boğaziçi University (formerly part of Robert College), as well as Hamlin Hall in Middlebury College's Freeman International Center are named after him.

Perhaps not anticipating its eventual widespread publication, Hamlin sent a letter to the Christian Mirror in 1865 which became widely republished and likely influenced doctors throughout America. Later, Hamlin discusses his experience with Cholera in Among the Turks (1878). He recalled that Cholera came irregularly every 5 to 10 years in Constantinople, with its "most terrible ravages" in August 1865. "At the close of these calamities I wrote the following letter home. It was widely published at the time, and as it contains the results of much experience, it may be worth preserving". The letter was published initially November 1865 by The Christian Mirror of Portland, Maine entitled "The Cholera. Dr. Hamlin's Letter from Constantinople".

In his Letter, Hamlin stated, "I wish to make my friends in America some suggestions". Dr. Hamlin listed four suggestions, a four step course of treatment, and hypotheses on "Contagion". The four suggestions included, 1. "Every family should be prepared to treat it without waiting for a physician", 2. "If you prepare for it, it will not come", 3. The cause, based upon his experience with "at least a hundred cases", most often could be traced to improper diet (not defined), intoxicating drink, or both, and 4. symptoms, stating "when diarrhoea commences, though painless and slight, it is in reality the skirmishing party of the advancing column". His recommended course of therapy would consist of four steps. First, stop the diarrhea with "Mixture No. 1", consisting of laudanum, Spirits of Camphor, and Tincture of Rhubarb. Second, mustard poultices applied to the abdomen. Third, rest. And step four, "Mixture No. 2" for more severe attacks using laudanum, capsicum, ginger, and cardamom seeds. Hamlin stated "I lay no claim to originality in recommending this course of treatment", having "adopted the treatment from able and experienced physicians". He claimed, "During the recent Cholera, I cannot find that any treatment has been so successful as this". Finally, he concludes that "The idea of contagion should be abandoned". The significant impact of Cyrus Hamlin's Letter regarding Cholera can be seen in just the title of a follow up article in 1866 entitled, " Dr. Hamlin's Essay on the Cholera: Preparation for Its Prevention and Cure By Cyrus Hamlin, of Constantinople and Other Eminent Men, Who Treated the Cholera With Unparalleled Success In Europe and America in 1848, 1855 and 1865".

For many years, he lived in Lexington, Massachusetts. He is buried in Lexington's Munroe Cemetery.

== Notes ==
Preceded by Calvin Butler Hulbert	President of Middlebury College; 1880–1885	Succeeded by Ezra Brainerd
