= June 4 =

June 4 this year in various calendars
- Thursday, 4 June 2026
Akan	Foyaw
Armenian	19 Margach 1475
Aztec	Teotleco 5, 3 Ācatl
Babylonian	17 Ayaru, 2337 SE
Balinese pawukon	Luang, Pepet, Pasah, Sri, Paing, Tungleh, Wraspati of Julungwangi, Ludra, Nohan, Raja
Bengali	21 Joishtho, BS 1433
Chinese	Yin Earth Rooster・Dipper Mansion; Fire Horse Year, Month 4, Day 19 (Xiaoman, 1 day until Mangzhong)
Common Era	4 June 2026 CE
Coptic	27 Pashons, AM 1742
Egyptian	19 Phaophi, 2775 NE
Ethiopian	27 Genbot, 2018 Amätä Məhrät
French Republican	Décade II, Sextidi de Prairial de l'Année 234 de la République
Gregorian	4 June, AD 2026
Hebrew	19 Sivan, AM 5786
Hindu	Uttarāṣāḍha・Śukla; Solar: 21 Jyeṣṭha, 1948 SE; Lunisolar: Caturthī, Kṛishna pakṣa of Adhika Jyeṣṭha, 2083 VE; Rāudra・5127 KY・1,872,730
Icelandic	Fimmtudagur, 13 Skerpla 2026
Islamic	18 Dhu al-Hijjah, AH 1447 (using tabular method)
ISO week date	2026-W23-4
Japanese	19 Uzuki, Reiwa 8 (Shōman, 2 days until Bōshu)
Julian	22 May, AD 2026 (AM 7534)
Julian day	2461196
Korean	19 Baemdal, 4359 DE
Maya	13.0.13.11.13; 6 Zotz, 3 Ben
Roman	ante diem XI Kalendas Iunias, MMDCCLXXIX AUC
Solar Hijri	14 Khordad, SH 1405
Tibetan	19 sa ga, me pho rta 2153 or 1772 or 1000

<<	June					>>
Su	Mo	Tu	We	Th	Fr	Sa
	1	2	3	4	5	6
7	8	9	10	11	12	13
14	15	16	17	18	19	20
21	22	23	24	25	26	27
28	29	30
2026

June 4 in recent years
2026 (Thursday)
2025 (Wednesday)
2024 (Tuesday)
2023 (Sunday)
2022 (Saturday)
2021 (Friday)
2020 (Thursday)
2019 (Tuesday)
2018 (Monday)
2017 (Sunday)

June 4 is the 155th day of the year (156th in leap years) in the Gregorian calendar; 210 days remain until the end of the year.

== Events ==
=== Pre-1600 ===
- 713 – The imperial official Artemius is chosen as Byzantine emperor the day after the blinding of previous emperor Philippicus. Artemisius chooses the name of Anastasius II and announces his adherence to Chalcedonian Christianity.
- 1411 – King Charles VI of France grants a monopoly for the ripening of Roquefort cheese to the people of Roquefort-sur-Soulzon, as they had been doing for centuries.
- 1525 – Bayham Abbey riot: Villagers from Kent and Sussex, England riot and occupy Bayham Old Abbey for a week in protest against Cardinal Thomas Wolsey's order to suppress the monastery in order to fund two colleges founded by him.
- 1561 – The steeple of St Paul's, the medieval cathedral of London, is destroyed in a fire caused by lightning, and is never rebuilt.

=== 1601–1900 ===
- 1615 – Siege of Osaka: Forces under Tokugawa Ieyasu take Osaka Castle in Japan.
- 1745 – Battle of Hohenfriedberg: Frederick the Great's Prussian army decisively defeat an Austrian army under Prince Charles Alexander of Lorraine during the War of the Austrian Succession.
- 1760 – Great Upheaval: New England planters arrive to claim land in Nova Scotia, Canada, taken from the Acadians.
- 1783 – The Montgolfier brothers publicly demonstrate their montgolfière (hot air balloon).
- 1784 – Élisabeth Thible becomes the first woman to fly in an untethered hot air balloon. Her flight covers four kilometres (2.5 mi) in 45 minutes, and reaches an estimated 1,500 metres (4,900 ft) in altitude.
- 1792 – Captain George Vancouver claims Puget Sound for the Kingdom of Great Britain.
- 1796 – The siege of Mantua begins when Napoleon Bonaparte lays siege to the fortress of Mantua, the last Austrian stronghold in Northern Italy. It will become the main focus of Napoleon's army for eight months during the Italian campaign of 1796-1797.
- 1802 – King Charles Emmanuel IV of Sardinia abdicates his throne in favor of his brother, Victor Emmanuel.
- 1812 – Following Louisiana's admittance as a U.S. state, the Louisiana Territory is renamed the Missouri Territory.
- 1825 – General Lafayette, a French officer in the American Revolutionary War, speaks at what would become Lafayette Square in Buffalo, New York, during his visit to the United States.
- 1855 – Major Henry C. Wayne departs New York aboard the USS Supply to procure camels to establish the U.S. Camel Corps.
- 1859 – Italian Independence wars: In the Battle of Magenta, the French army, under Louis-Napoleon, defeat the Austrian army.
- 1862 – American Civil War: Confederate troops evacuate Fort Pillow on the Mississippi River, leaving the way clear for Union troops to take Memphis, Tennessee.
- 1876 – An express train called the Transcontinental Express arrives in San Francisco via the first transcontinental railroad, 83 hours and 39 minutes after leaving New York City.
- 1878 – Cyprus Convention: The Ottoman Empire cedes Cyprus to the United Kingdom but retains nominal title.
- 1896 – Henry Ford completes the Ford Quadricycle, his first gasoline-powered automobile, and also gives it a successful test run.

=== 1901–present ===
- 1912 – Massachusetts becomes the first state of the United States to set a minimum wage.
- 1913 – Emily Davison, a suffragette, runs out in front of King George V's horse at The Derby. She is trampled, never regains consciousness, and dies four days later.
- 1916 – World War I: Russia opens the Brusilov Offensive with an artillery barrage of Austro-Hungarian lines in Galicia.
- 1917 – The first Pulitzer Prizes are awarded: Laura E. Richards, Maude H. Elliott, and Florence Hall receive the first Pulitzer for biography (for Julia Ward Howe). Jean Jules Jusserand receives the first Pulitzer for history for his work With Americans of Past and Present Days. Herbert B. Swope receives the first Pulitzer for journalism for his work for the New York World.
- 1919 – Women's rights: The U.S. Congress approves the Nineteenth Amendment to the United States Constitution, which guarantees suffrage to women, and sends it to the U.S. states for ratification.
- 1919 – Leon Trotsky bans the planned Fourth Regional Congress of Peasants, Workers and Insurgents.
- 1920 – Hungary loses 71% of its territory and 63% of its population when the Treaty of Trianon is signed in Paris.
- 1928 – The President of the Republic of China, Zhang Zuolin, is assassinated by Japanese agents.
- 1932 – Marmaduke Grove and other Chilean military officers lead a coup d'état establishing the short-lived Socialist Republic of Chile.
- 1939 – The Holocaust: The MS St. Louis, a ship carrying 973 German Jewish refugees, is denied permission to land in Florida, in the United States, after already being turned away from Cuba. Forced to return to Europe, more than 200 of its passengers later die in Nazi concentration camps.
- 1940 – World War II: The Dunkirk evacuation ends: The British Armed Forces completes evacuation of 338,000 troops from Dunkirk in France. To rally the morale of the country, Winston Churchill delivers, only to the House of Commons, his famous "We shall fight on the beaches" speech.
- 1942 – World War II: The Battle of Midway begins. Japanese Admiral Chūichi Nagumo orders a strike on Midway Island by much of the Imperial Japanese Navy.
- 1942 – World War II: Gustaf Mannerheim, the Commander-in-Chief of the Finnish Army, is granted the title of Marshal of Finland by the government on his 75th birthday. On the same day, Adolf Hitler arrives in Finland for a surprise visit to meet Mannerheim.
- 1943 – A military coup in Argentina ousts Ramón Castillo.
- 1944 – World War II: A hunter-killer group of the United States Navy captures the German Kriegsmarine submarine U-505, the first time a U.S. Navy vessel had captured an enemy vessel at sea since the 19th century.
- 1944 – World War II: The United States Fifth Army captures Rome, although much of the German Fourteenth Army is able to withdraw to the north.
- 1946 – in Argentina assumes its first presidency Juan Domingo Perón.
- 1961 – Cold War: In the Vienna summit, the Soviet premier Nikita Khrushchev sparks the Berlin Crisis by threatening to sign a separate peace treaty with East Germany and ending American, British and French access to East Berlin.
- 1967 – Seventy-two people are killed when a Canadair C-4 Argonaut crashes at Stockport in England.
- 1970 – Tonga gains independence from the British Empire.
- 1975 – Governor of California Jerry Brown signs the California Agricultural Labor Relations Act into law, the first law in the United States giving farmworkers collective bargaining rights.
- 1977 – JVC introduces its VHS videotape at the Consumer Electronics Show in Chicago. It will eventually prevail against Sony's rival Betamax system in a format war to become the predominant home video medium.
- 1979 – Flight Lieutenant Jerry Rawlings takes power in Ghana after a military coup in which General Fred Akuffo is overthrown.
- 1983 – Gordon Kahl, who killed two US Marshals in Medina, North Dakota on February 13, is killed in a shootout in Smithville, Arkansas, along with a local sheriff, after a four-month manhunt.
- 1986 – Jonathan Pollard pleads guilty to espionage for selling top secret United States military intelligence to Israel.
- 1988 – Three cars on a train carrying hexogen to Kazakhstan explode in Arzamas, Gorky Oblast, USSR, killing 91 and injuring about 1,500.
- 1989 – In the 1989 Iranian supreme leader election, Ali Khamenei is elected as the new Supreme Leader of Iran after the death and funeral of Ruhollah Khomeini.
- 1989 – The 1989 Tiananmen Square protests are suppressed in Beijing by the People's Liberation Army, with between 241 and 10,000 dead (an unofficial estimate).
- 1989 – Solidarity's victory in the 1989 Polish legislative election occurs, the first election since the Communist Polish United Workers' Party abandoned its monopoly of power. It sparks off the Revolutions of 1989 in Eastern Europe.
- 1989 – Ufa train disaster: A natural gas explosion near Ufa, Russia, kills 575 as two trains passing each other throw sparks near a leaky pipeline.
- 1996 – The first flight of Ariane 5 explodes after roughly 37 seconds. It was a Cluster mission.
- 2005 – The Civic Forum of the Romanians of Covasna, Harghita and Mureș is founded.
- 2010 – Falcon 9 Flight 1 is the maiden flight of the SpaceX Falcon 9 rocket, which launches from Cape Canaveral Air Force Station Space Launch Complex 40.
- 2020 – Death of Giovanni López: Protests over the death of Giovanni López Ramírez, who had died on 4 May while in custody, begin in Jalisco following the release of a video of his arrest going viral on social media, and inspired by the George Floyd protests. Later, these spread across Mexico.
- 2023 – Protests begin in Poland against the PiS government.
- 2023 – Four people are killed when a Cessna Citation V crashes into Mine Bank Mountain in Augusta County, Virginia.
- 2025 – Eleven people are killed and 56 people are injured during a crowd crush incident outside M. Chinnaswamy Stadium in Bengaluru, India for the celebration of Royal Challengers Bengaluru's Indian Premier League victory.

== Births ==
=== Pre-1600 ===
- 590 – Harsha, Maharajadhiraja of Kannauj (died 647)
- 1394 – Philippa of England, Queen of Denmark, Norway and Sweden (died 1430)
- 1489 – Antoine, Duke of Lorraine (died 1544)
- 1563 – George Heriot, Scottish goldsmith (died 1624)

=== 1601–1900 ===
- 1604 – Claudia de' Medici, Italian daughter of Christina of Lorraine (died 1648)
- 1665 – Zacharie Robutel de La Noue, Canadian captain (died 1733)
- 1694 – François Quesnay, French economist and physician (died 1774)
- 1704 – Benjamin Huntsman, English inventor and businessman (died 1776)
- 1738 – George III of the United Kingdom (died 1820)
- 1744 – Patrick Ferguson, Scottish soldier, designed the Ferguson rifle (died 1780)
- 1754 – Miguel de Azcuénaga, Argentinian soldier (died 1833)
- 1754 – Franz Xaver von Zach, Slovak astronomer and academic (died 1832)
- 1787 – Constant Prévost, French geologist and academic (died 1856)
- 1801 – James Pennethorne, English architect, designed Victoria Park (died 1871)
- 1821 – Apollon Maykov, Russian poet and playwright (died 1897)
- 1829 – Jinmaku Kyūgorō, Japanese sumo wrestler, the 12th Yokozuna (died 1903)
- 1854 – Solko van den Bergh, Dutch target shooter (died 1916)
- 1860 – Alexis Lapointe, Canadian runner (died 1924)
- 1861 – William Propsting, Australian politician, 20th Premier of Tasmania (died 1937)
- 1866 – Miina Sillanpää, Finnish journalist and politician (died 1952)
- 1867 – Carl Gustaf Emil Mannerheim, Finnish general and politician, 6th President of Finland (died 1951)
- 1873 – Nictzin Dyalhis, American author (died 1942)
- 1877 – Heinrich Otto Wieland, German chemist and academic, Nobel Prize laureate (died 1957)
- 1879 – Mabel Lucie Attwell, English author and illustrator (died 1964)
- 1880 – Clara Blandick, American actress (died 1962)
- 1885 – Arturo Rawson, Argentinian general and politician, 26th President of Argentina (died 1952)
- 1889 – Beno Gutenberg, German-American seismologist (died 1960)

=== 1901–present ===
- 1903 – Yevgeny Mravinsky, Russian conductor (died 1988)
- 1904 – Bhagat Puran Singh, Indian publisher, environmentalist, and philanthropist (died 1992)
- 1907 – Jacques Roumain, Haitian journalist and politician (died 1944)
- 1907 – Rosalind Russell, American actress (died 1976)
- 1907 – Patience Strong, English poet and journalist (died 1990)
- 1910 – Christopher Cockerell, English engineer, invented the hovercraft (died 1999)
- 1912 – Robert Jacobsen, Danish sculptor and painter (died 1993)
- 1915 – Walter Hadlee, New Zealand cricketer (died 2006)
- 1915 – Modibo Keïta, Malian educator and politician, 1st President of Mali (died 1977)
- 1915 – Nils Kihlberg, Swedish actor, singer, and director (died 1965)
- 1916 – Robert F. Furchgott, American biochemist and pharmacologist, Nobel Prize laureate (died 2009)
- 1916 – Gaylord Nelson, American politician and environmentalist, 35th Governor of Wisconsin (died 2005)
- 1916 – Fernand Leduc, Canadian painter (died 2014)
- 1917 – Robert Merrill, American actor and singer (died 2004)
- 1920 – Mia Bustam, Indonesian painter, writer, and political prisoner (died 2011)
- 1921 – Milan Komar, Slovenian-Argentinian philosopher and academic (died 2006)
- 1921 – Bobby Wanzer, American basketball player and coach (died 2016)
- 1923 – Elizabeth Jolley, English-Australian author and academic (died 2007)
- 1923 – Masutatsu Ōyama, Korean-Japanese karateka (died 1994)
- 1923 – Yuriko, Princess Mikasa, Japanese princess (died 2024)
- 1924 – Tofilau Eti Alesana, Samoan politician, 5th Prime Minister of Samoa (died 1999)
- 1924 – Dennis Weaver, American actor and director (died 2006)
- 1925 – Antonio Puchades, Spanish footballer (died 2013)
- 1926 – Robert Earl Hughes, American who was the heaviest human being recorded in the history of the world during his lifetime (died 1958)
- 1926 – Ain Kaalep, Estonian poet, playwright, and critic (died 2020)
- 1926 – Judith Malina, German-American actress and director, co-founded The Living Theatre (died 2015)
- 1927 – Henning Carlsen, Danish director, producer, and screenwriter (died 2014)
- 1927 – Geoffrey Palmer, English actor (died 2020)
- 1928 – Ruth Westheimer, German-American sex therapist, talk show host, professor, author, and Holocaust survivor (died 2024)
- 1929 – Karolos Papoulias, Greek lawyer and politician, 5th President of Greece (died 2021)
- 1930 – George Chesworth, English air marshal and politician, Lord Lieutenant of Moray (died 2017)
- 1930 – Morgana King, American singer and actress (died 2018)
- 1930 – Viktor Tikhonov, Russian ice hockey player and coach (died 2014)
- 1931 – Gustav Nossal, Austrian-Australian biologist and academic
- 1932 – John Drew Barrymore, American actor (died 2004)
- 1932 – Oliver Nelson, American saxophonist and composer (died 1975)
- 1932 – Maurice Shadbolt, New Zealand author and playwright (died 2004)
- 1934 – Monica Dacon, Vincentian educator and politician, 6th Governor-General of Saint Vincent and the Grenadines
- 1934 – Daphne Sheldrick, Kenyan-British conservationist and author (died 2018)
- 1935 – Colette Boky, Canadian soprano and actress
- 1935 – Berhanu Dinka, Ethiopian economist and diplomat (died 2013)
- 1936 – Vince Camuto, American fashion designer and businessman, co-founded Nine West (died 2015)
- 1936 – Bruce Dern, American actor
- 1937 – Freddy Fender, American singer and guitarist (died 2006)
- 1937 – Gorilla Monsoon, American wrestler (died 1999)
- 1937 – Mortimer Zuckerman, Canadian-American businessman and publisher, founded Boston Properties
- 1938 – John Harvard, Canadian journalist and politician, 23rd Lieutenant Governor of Manitoba (died 2016)
- 1938 – Art Mahaffey, American baseball player
- 1939 – George Reid, Scottish journalist and politician, 2nd Presiding Officer of the Scottish Parliament
- 1940 – Ludwig Schwarz, Slovak-Austrian bishop
- 1941 – Kenneth G. Ross, Australian playwright and screenwriter
- 1942 – Louis Reichardt, American mountaineer
- 1942 – Bill Rowe, Canadian lawyer and politician
- 1943 – Sandra Haynie, American golfer
- 1944 – Michelle Phillips, American singer-songwriter and actress
- 1945 – Anthony Braxton, American saxophonist, clarinet player, and composer
- 1945 – Daniel Topolski, English rower and coach (died 2015)
- 1945 – Gordon Waller, Scottish singer-songwriter and guitarist (died 2009)
- 1947 – Viktor Klima, Austrian businessman and politician, 25th Chancellor of Austria
- 1948 – Bob Champion, English jockey
- 1948 – Sandra Post, Canadian golfer and sportscaster
- 1948 – Paquito D'Rivera, Cuban-American Grammy Award-winning musician
- 1948 – Jürgen Sparwasser, German footballer and manager
- 1950 – Raymond Dumais, Canadian bishop (died 2012)
- 1951 – Bronisław Malinowski, Polish runner (died 1981)
- 1951 – Lyle Stewart, Canadian politician, Saskatchewan MLA (1999–2023) (died 2024)
- 1952 – Bronisław Komorowski, Polish historian and politician, 5th President of Poland
- 1952 – Dambudzo Marechera, Zimbabwean author and poet (died 1987)
- 1952 – Stephen J. Hemsley, American businessman
- 1953 – Linda Lingle, American journalist and politician, 6th Governor of Hawaii
- 1953 – Jimmy McCulloch, Scottish musician and songwriter (died 1979)
- 1953 – Susumu Ojima, Japanese businessman, founded Huser
- 1954 – Raphael Ravenscroft, English saxophonist and composer (died 2014)
- 1954 – Kazuhiro Yamaji, Japanese actor and voice actor
- 1955 – Val McDermid, Scottish author
- 1955 – Mary Testa, American singer and actress
- 1956 – Keith David, American actor
- 1956 – Joyce Sidman, American author and poet
- 1957 – Tinsley Ellis, American electric blues guitarist and singer
- 1957 – Neil McNab, Scottish footballer
- 1959 – Georgios Voulgarakis, Greek politician, 21st Greek Minister for Culture
- 1959 – Anil Ambani, Indian businessman
- 1960 – Miloš Đelmaš, Serbian footballer and manager
- 1960 – Bradley Walsh, English television presenter, comedian, singer and former footballer
- 1961 – El DeBarge, American singer-songwriter and producer
- 1961 – Ferenc Gyurcsány, Hungarian businessman and politician, 6th Prime Minister of Hungary
- 1962 – Krzysztof Hołowczyc, Polish racing driver
- 1962 – Zenon Jaskuła, Polish cyclist
- 1963 – Sean Fitzpatrick, New Zealand rugby union player
- 1963 – Xavier McDaniel, American basketball player and coach
- 1964 – Sean Pertwee, English actor
- 1964 – Kōji Yamamura, Japanese animator, producer, and screenwriter
- 1965 – Mick Doohan, Australian motorcycle racer
- 1965 – Andrea Jaeger, American tennis player and preacher
- 1966 – Cecilia Bartoli, Italian soprano and actress
- 1966 – Svetlana Jitomirskaya, American mathematician
- 1966 – Vladimir Voevodsky, Russian mathematician and academic (died 2017)
- 1966 – Bill Wiggin, English politician, Shadow Secretary of State for Wales
- 1967 – Michael Greyeyes, Canadian actor, dancer, choreographer, director, and educator
- 1967 – Robert S. Kimbrough, American colonel and astronaut
- 1968 – Niurka Montalvo, Cuban-Spanish long jumper
- 1968 – Al B. Sure!, American R&B singer-songwriter, keyboard player, and producer
- 1968 – Scott Wolf, American actor
- 1969 – Horatio Sanz, Chilean-American actor and comedian
- 1970 – Deborah Compagnoni, Italian skier
- 1970 – Richie Hawtin, English-Canadian DJ and producer
- 1970 – Dave Pybus, English bass player and songwriter
- 1970 – Izabella Scorupco, Polish-Swedish actress and model
- 1971 – Joseph Kabila, Congolese soldier and politician, President of the Democratic Republic of the Congo
- 1971 – Mike Lee, American lawyer and politician
- 1971 – Shoji Meguro, Japanese director and composer
- 1971 – Noah Wyle, American actor and producer
- 1972 – Derian Hatcher, American ice hockey defenseman
- 1972 – Rob Huebel, American comedian, actor, producer, and screenwriter
- 1973 – Mikey Whipwreck, American wrestler and trainer
- 1974 – Jacob Sahaya Kumar Aruni, Indian chef (died 2012)
- 1974 – Janette Husárová, Slovak tennis player
- 1974 – Buddy Wakefield, American poet and author
- 1975 – Russell Brand, English comedian and actor
- 1975 – Angelina Jolie, American actress, filmmaker, humanitarian, and activist
- 1975 – Dinanath Ramnarine, Trinidadian cricketer
- 1976 – Kasey Chambers, Australian singer-songwriter and guitarist
- 1976 – Alexei Navalny, Russian lawyer and politician (died 2024)
- 1976 – Nenad Zimonjić, Serbian tennis player
- 1977 – Dionisis Chiotis, Greek footballer
- 1977 – Alex Manninger, Austrian footballer (died 2026)
- 1977 – Roman Miroshnichenko, Ukrainian guitarist and composer
- 1978 – Scott Cawthon, American video game developer, writer, and producer
- 1979 – Naohiro Takahara, Japanese footballer
- 1979 – Daniel Vickerman, South African-Australian rugby player (died 2017)
- 1980 – François Beauchemin, Canadian ice hockey player
- 1981 – Jennifer Carroll, Canadian swimmer
- 1981 – T.J. Miller, American actor and comedian
- 1981 – Giourkas Seitaridis, Greek footballer
- 1981 – Gary Taylor-Fletcher, English footballer
- 1981 – Natalia Vodopyanova, Russian basketball player
- 1982 – Matt Gilks, Scottish footballer
- 1982 – Abel Kirui, Kenyan runner
- 1983 – Romaric, Ivorian footballer
- 1983 – Emmanuel Eboué, Ivorian footballer
- 1983 – Olha Saladuha, Ukrainian triple jumper
- 1984 – Henri Bedimo, Cameroonian footballer
- 1984 – Kento Handa, Japanese actor and singer
- 1984 – Stuart Kettlewell, Scottish football manager and former player
- 1984 – Enrico Rossi Chauvenet, Italian footballer
- 1984 – Ian White, Canadian ice hockey player
- 1984 – Rainie Yang, Taiwanese actress
- 1985 – Leon Botha, South African painter and DJ (died 2011)
- 1985 – Anna-Lena Grönefeld, German tennis player
- 1985 – Evan Lysacek, American figure skater
- 1985 – Lukas Podolski, German footballer
- 1985 – Bar Refaeli, Israeli model and actress
- 1985 – Oddvar Reiakvam, Norwegian politician
- 1987 – Mollie King, English singer, former member of The Saturdays
- 1988 – Matt Bartkowski, American ice hockey defenseman
- 1988 – Kimberley Busteed, Australian model
- 1988 – Tjaronn Chery, Dutch-born Surinamese footballer
- 1989 – Paweł Fajdek, Polish hammer thrower
- 1990 – Evan Spiegel, American Internet entrepreneur
- 1991 – Lorenzo Insigne, Italian footballer
- 1991 – Matt McIlwrick, New Zealand rugby league player
- 1991 – Ben Stokes, New Zealand-English cricketer
- 1991 – Rajiv van La Parra, Dutch footballer
- 1992 – Jordan Hugill, English footballer
- 1993 – Jonathan Huberdeau, Canadian ice hockey player
- 1993 – Juan Iturbe, Paraguayan footballer
- 1993 – Aaron Nola, American baseball player
- 1993 – Annika Taylor, British-American cross-country skier
- 1996 – Oli McBurnie, Scottish footballer
- 1998 – Central Cee, British rapper and songwriter
- 1999 – Kim So-hyun, South Korean actress
- 1999 – Drew Pavlou, Australian activist
- 2001 – Choerry, South Korean singer and member of Loona
- 2001 – Takefusa Kubo, Japanese footballer
- 2004 – Mackenzie Ziegler, American child actress, dancer, and recording artist
- 2021 – Princess Lilibet of Sussex

== Deaths ==
=== Pre-1600 ===
- 756 – Shōmu, Japanese emperor (born 701)
- 863 – Charles, archbishop of Mainz
- 895 – Li Xi, chancellor of the Tang Dynasty
- 946 – Guaimar II (Gybbosus), Lombard prince
- 956 – Muhammad III of Shirvan, Muslim ruler
- 1039 – Conrad II, Holy Roman Emperor (born 990)
- 1102 – Władysław I Herman, Polish nobleman (born c. 1044)
- 1134 – Magnus Nielsen (born 1106), Danish duke
- 1135 – Emperor Huizong of Song (born 1082)
- 1206 – Adela of Champagne (born 1140)
- 1246 – Isabella of Angoulême (born 1188)
- 1257 – Przemysł I of Greater Poland (born 1221)
- 1394 – Mary de Bohun, wife of Henry IV of England (bornc. 1368)
- 1453 – Andronikos Palaiologos Kantakouzenos, Byzantine commander
- 1463 – Flavio Biondo, Italian historian and author (born 1392)
- 1472 – Nezahualcoyotl, Aztec poet (born 1402)
- 1585 – Muretus, French philosopher and author (born 1526)

=== 1601–1900 ===
- 1608 – Francis Caracciolo, Italian Catholic priest (born 1563)
- 1622 – Péter Révay, Hungarian soldier and historian (born 1568)
- 1647 – Canonicus, Grand Chief Sachem of the Narragansett (born 1565)
- 1663 – William Juxon, English archbishop and academic (born 1582)
- 1798 – Giacomo Casanova, Italian adventurer and author (born 1725)
- 1801 – Frederick Muhlenberg, American minister and politician, 1st Speaker of the United States House of Representatives (born 1750)
- 1809 – Nicolai Abildgaard, Danish neoclassical and history painter, sculptor and architect (born 1743)
- 1830 – Antonio José de Sucre, Venezuelan general and politician, 2nd President of Bolivia (born 1795)
- 1872 – Johan Rudolph Thorbecke, Dutch historian, jurist and politician, Prime Minister of the Netherlands (born 1798)
- 1875 – Eduard Mörike, German pastor and poet (born 1804)
- 1876 – Abdulaziz, 32nd Sultan of the Ottoman Empire (born 1830)

=== 1901–present ===
- 1906 – George Griffith, British writer (born 1857)
- 1922 – W. H. R. Rivers, English anthropologist, neurologist, ethnologist, and psychiatrist (born 1864)
- 1925 – Margaret Murray Washington, American Academic (born 1865)
- 1926 – Fred Spofforth, Australian-English cricketer and coach (born 1853)
- 1928 – Zhang Zuolin, Chinese warlord (born 1873)
- 1929 – Harry Frazee, American director, producer, and agent (born 1881)
- 1931 – Hussein bin Ali, Sharif of Mecca, Sharif and Emir of Mecca, King of the Hejaz (born 1853–54)
- 1933 – Ahmet Haşim, Turkish poet and author (born 1884)
- 1936 – Mathilde Verne, English pianist and educator (born 1869)
- 1938 – Pepita Not, Catalan anarchist activist (born 1897)
- 1939 – Tommy Ladnier, American trumpet player (born 1900)
- 1941 – Wilhelm II, German Emperor (born 1859)
- 1942 – Reinhard Heydrich, German SS officer and a principle architect of the Holocaust (born 1904)
- 1951 – Serge Koussevitzky, Russian-American bassist, composer, and conductor (born 1874)
- 1956 – Katherine MacDonald, American actress and producer (born 1881)
- 1962 – Clem McCarthy, American sportscaster (born 1882)
- 1967 – Linda Eenpalu, Estonian lawyer and politician (born 1890)
- 1968 – Dorothy Gish, American actress (born 1898)
- 1970 – Sonny Tufts, American actor (born 1911)
- 1971 – György Lukács, Hungarian historian and philosopher (born 1885)
- 1973 – Maurice René Fréchet, French mathematician and academic (born 1878)
- 1973 – Murry Wilson, American songwriter, producer, and manager (born 1917)
- 1981 – Leslie Averill, New Zealand doctor and soldier (born 1897)
- 1989 – Dik Browne, American cartoonist (born 1917)
- 1990 – Stiv Bators, American singer-songwriter and guitarist (born 1949)
- 1990 – Zdenka Ziková, Czech opera singer (born 1902)
- 1992 – Carl Stotz, American businessman, founded Little League Baseball (born 1910)
- 1993 – Bernard Evslin, American writer (born 1922)
- 1994 – Derek Leckenby, English musician (born 1943)
- 1997 – Ronnie Lane, English singer-songwriter, guitarist, and producer (born 1946)
- 1998 – Josephine Hutchinson, American actress (born 1903)
- 2002 – Fernando Belaúnde Terry, Peruvian architect and politician, 42nd President of Peru (born 1912)
- 2004 – Steve Lacy, American saxophonist and composer (born 1934)
- 2004 – Nino Manfredi, Italian actor (born 1921)
- 2007 – Clete Boyer, American baseball player and coach (born 1937)
- 2007 – Bill France Jr., American businessman (born 1933)
- 2007 – Craig L. Thomas, American captain and politician (born 1933)
- 2010 – John Wooden, American basketball player and coach (born 1910)
- 2011 – Juan Francisco Luis, Virgin Islander sergeant and politician, 23rd Governor of the United States Virgin Islands (born 1940)
- 2011 – Andreas P. Nielsen, Danish author and composer (born 1953)
- 2012 – Peter Beaven, New Zealand architect, designed the Lyttelton Road Tunnel Administration Building (born 1925)
- 2012 – Pedro Borbón, Dominican-American baseball player (born 1946)
- 2012 – Rodolfo Quezada Toruño, Guatemalan cardinal (born 1932)
- 2012 – Herb Reed, American violinist (born 1929)
- 2013 – Walt Arfons, American race car driver (born 1916)
- 2013 – Joey Covington, American drummer (born 1945)
- 2013 – Hermann Gunnarsson, Icelandic footballer, handball player, and sportscaster (born 1946)
- 2013 – Will Wynn, American football player (born 1949)
- 2014 – George Ho, American-Hong Kong businessman (born 1919)
- 2014 – Nathan Shamuyarira, Zimbabwean journalist and politician, Zimbabwean Minister of Foreign Affairs (born 1928)
- 2014 – Sydney Templeman, Baron Templeman, English lawyer and judge (born 1920)
- 2014 – Don Zimmer, American baseball player, coach, and manager (born 1931)
- 2015 – Marguerite Patten, English economist and author (born 1915)
- 2015 – Leonid Plyushch, Ukrainian mathematician and academic (born 1938)
- 2015 – Jabe Thomas, American race car driver (born 1930)
- 2015 – Anne Warburton, British academic and diplomat, British Ambassador to Denmark (born 1927)
- 2016 – Carmen Pereira, Bissau-Guinean politician (born 1937)
- 2017 – Juan Goytisolo, Spanish essayist, poet and novelist (born 1931)
- 2021 – Clarence Williams III, American actor (born 1939)
- 2022 – George Lamming, Barbadian novelist (born 1927)
- 2023 – Sulochana Latkar, Indian actress (born 1928)
- 2024 – John Blackman, Australian radio and television presenter (born 1947)
- 2024 – Parnelli Jones, American racing driver (born 1933)
- 2025 – Marc Garneau, Canadian astronaut and Member of Parliament (born 1949)

== Holidays and observances ==
- Christian feast day:
  - Blessed Antoni Zawistowski
  - Filippo Smaldone
  - Francis Caracciolo
  - Optatus
  - Petroc of Cornwall
  - Quirinus of Sescia
  - Saturnina
  - June 4 (Eastern Orthodox liturgics)
- The Flag Day of the Finnish Defence Forces, also known as the birthday of C. G. E. Mannerheim, Marshal of Finland (Finland)
- Emancipation Day or Independence Day, commemorates the abolition of serfdom in Tonga by King George Tupou in 1862, and the independence of Tonga from the British protectorate in 1970. (Tonga)
- International Day of Innocent Children Victims of Aggression (International)
- Trianon Treaty Day (Romania)
- Memorials for the 1989 Tiananmen Square protests and massacre (International)
