= American College, Madurai =

Co-educational college in India

The American College
- Madurai
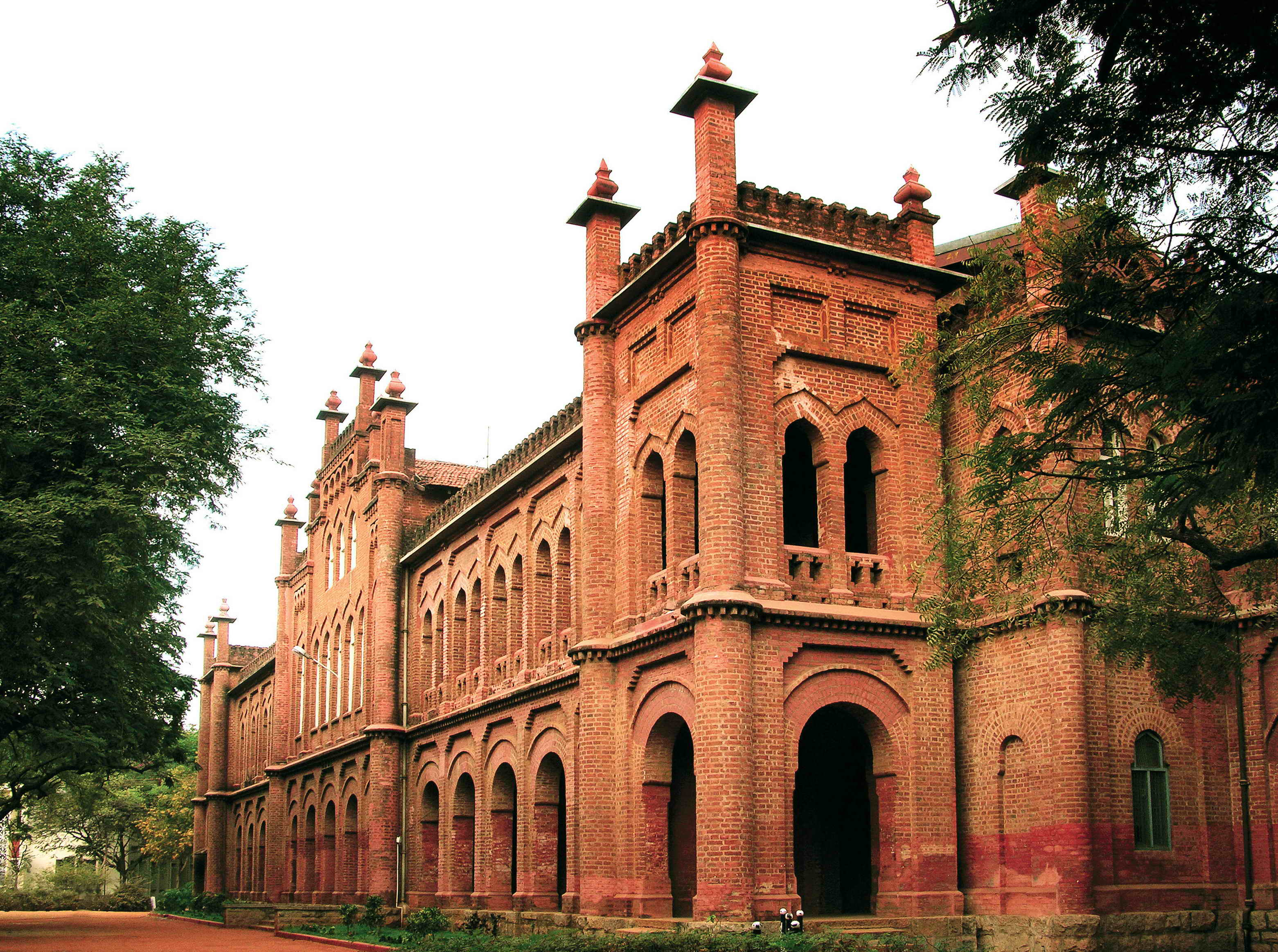
- Motto: Purificatus non consumptus (Latin)
- Motto in English: Purified, not consumed
- Type: Autonomous
- Established: 1881
- Academic affiliations: Madurai Kamaraj University
- Principal: Dr. J. Paul Jayakar (Principal & Secretary)
- Location: Madurai, Tamil Nadu, India; 9.929°N 78.132°E
- Campus: Goripalayam, Madurai and Satellite Campus at Chathirapatti
- Website: americancollege.edu.in

The American College, often referred to as American College, is one of the oldest colleges in India, located in Madurai, Tamil Nadu. It was founded in 1881 by American Christian missionaries. The red-brick buildings, in the Saracenic style, blend with the natural surroundings constructed by British architect Henry Irwin. Century-old buildings Main Hall, James Hall and Washburn Hall show the heritage of the college.

The college is ranked 54th among colleges in India by the National Institutional Ranking Framework (NIRF) in 2024.

== Location ==
It is situated on Alagar Koil Road in the Tallakkulam area of Madurai, in the northern-central part of the city, between Tamukkam Ground and Government Rajaji Hospital near Goripalayam. The campus lies a few kilometres from the Madurai railway station and the Periyar bus terminus.

== History ==
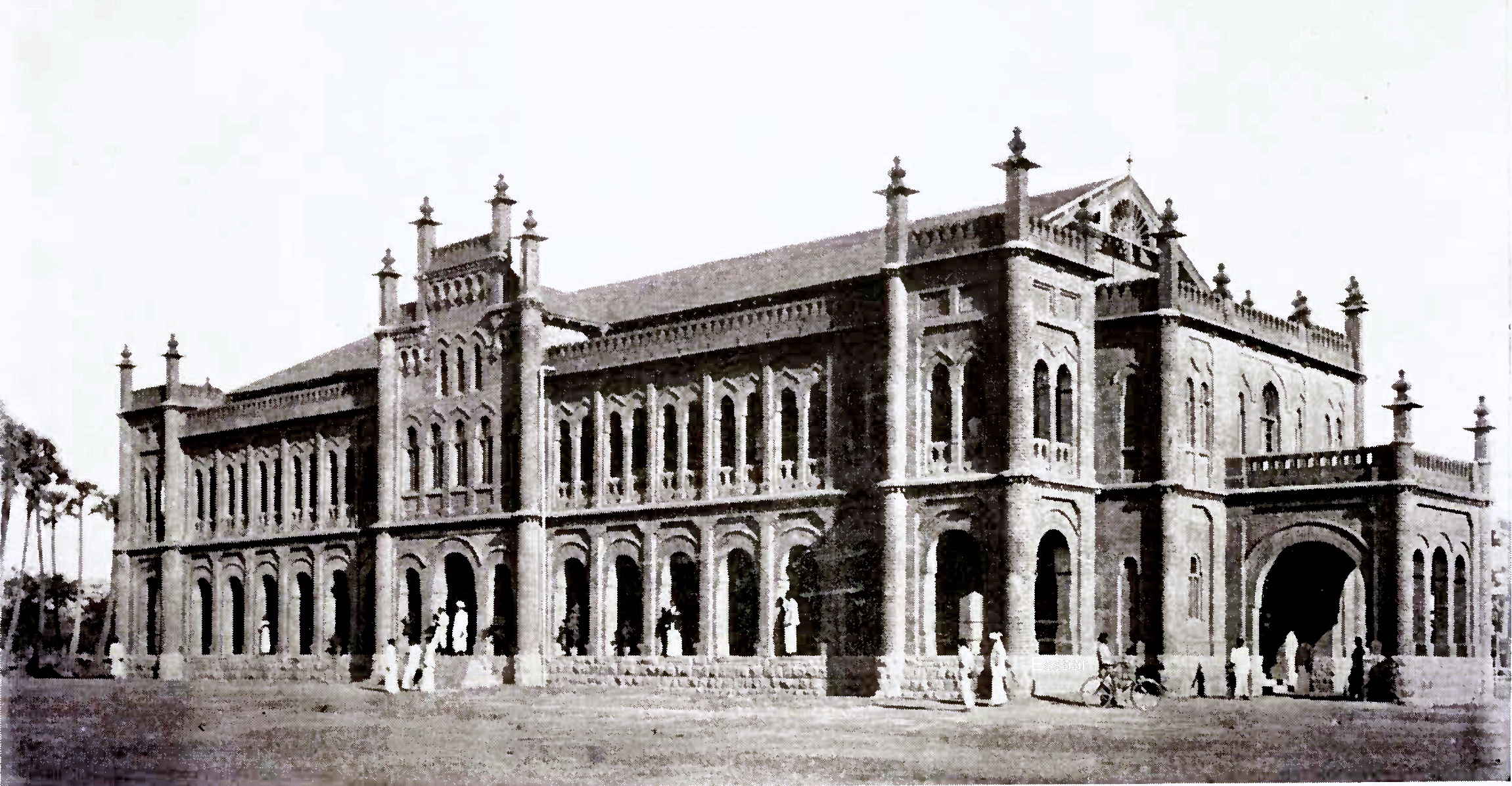
Main Hall of the American College, taken around 1905

Founded as a missionary in 1841 by the American Mission, the American College became a collegiate department in 1881. It was started initially as Pasumalai College in 1881 under the initiatives of Rev. George T. Washburn, the first principal. He hails from the Great Washburn clan. The college was shifted to its present location during the period of Rev. W.M. Zumbro, its second principal, who had his formal education at the University of Michigan, Columbia University and Yale University, made a proposal in 1903 to the missionary in the United States to shift the college from Pasumalai to Madurai. With more than 130 years of history, the college is remembered for its pioneering role in the cause of college autonomy.

In 1913, it became a first grade college while the first female student was admitted in 1921. The motto verse in the logo of The American College and Washburn University USA are still Purificatus non consumptus.

The college was visited by eminent people including Nobel Laureate Rabindranath Tagore who delivered a series of lectures on education in 1919.

The American College Main Hall building was constructed by Henry Irwin (who built the Mysore Palace) and principal G.T. Washburn was influential in getting funds from the US mainly from John D. Rockefeller. The building, to the surprise of people of this generation, was constructed at a cost of ₹52,000. Construction was started in 1898 and was completed in 1904.

Binghamton Hall was raised in 1930 in memory of William Zumbro, who masterminded the construction and landscaping in the college. Contributions from the people of Binghamton city made possible to build the hall of which is the part of Science block.

Lady James Hall is the home for the 100-year-old Chemistry department along with Physics and Zoology department was built by the contributions by Lady Ellen S. James with Robert Chisholm. This is the first science building in Madurai. The seeds for the establishment of the physical sciences department was laid by American missionary Rev. Edgar Martin Flint who served the institution between 1913 and 1943. The two-storey building constructed with bricks and mortar has withstood the time, producing thousands of science students from the southern districts. K.S. Krishnan, one of the co-scientists with Nobel Laureate Sir C. V. Raman, and G Rajasekaran, emeritus professor involved in India-based Neutrino Observatory project, are notable alumni of the college and went through the Hall. Seven of the alumni, who studied science in the Hall, later rose to receive the Shanti Swarup Bhatnagar Prize for Science and Technology.

Daniel Poor Memorial Library in Madurai often abbreviated as DPM Library is the central library of The American College It is one of the oldest libraries in South India. DPM officially began its functions on 28 June 1915. It is named in memory of Rev. Daniel Poor who was one of the pioneer missionaries who started the American Ceylon Mission in Jaffna in 1816. The Jubilee Chapel was dedicated in 1931 in commemoration of golden jubilee celebrations. The name Jubilee was adopted from the White Chapel of Senusret I.

Rabindranath Tagore gave public lectures in the year 1919 in the Main Hall and collected ₹2,365 out of which he took ₹2,000 for Visva-Bharati University, Shantiniketan and gave ₹365 for starting an endowment in American College. Georges Clemenceau who led France in the First World War delivered lectures in Main Hall and contributed the college.

The college was one of the first set of seven colleges to be made autonomous by the UGC in 1977. The first college to introduce "Campus Inn" hostel system was named after Washburn. Today the college offers 18n undergraduate and 13 postgraduate programmes. There are research centres offering M.Phil. and Ph.D. programme. There are other autonomous centres like Department of Applied Sciences (DAS) and The first college to introduce CBCS system and Student foreign exchange programme (Study abroad) in India.

The postgraduate Department of Social Work was added in 1998. The college has theater groups, social service schemes and NCC units that offer students opportunities to serve society. This college is known for its focus on academic excellence.

== Academics ==
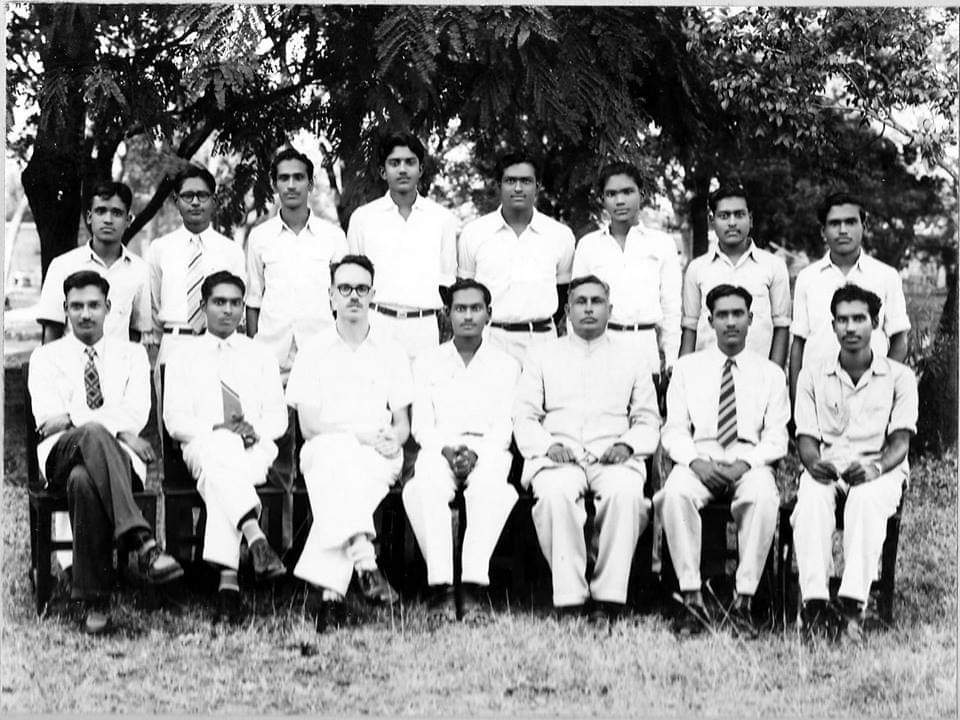
Bishop Pothirajulu as SCM president of the American College, Madurai

There are 18 undergraduate and 15 postgraduate programmes of study in the college, with seven of these departments engaged in research. In addition to the usual programmes in the humanities and the sciences, the college offers courses in Biochemistry, Biotechnology, Microbiology, Computer Science, Business Administration and Social Work. Innovative courses such as Gender Studies, Dalit Studies, Folk Arts, Epigraphy, etc., are offered under the appropriatemajor programmes. An interdisciplinary dimension is attempted by requiring the science majors to take courses in the humanities and vice versa.

The unique joint bachelor's degree on Religion, Philosophy and Sociology can be found only in the American College. Many notable scholars worked for this institution. Some of them who bought real change in college education system are C. T. K. Chari, Karmegha Konar, K. K. Neelakantan, and J. Vasanthan.

The American College is the first college in India to introduce Third Gender literature and studies with research-oriented seminar. The regional terms for genderqueer people was coined in this college by LGBTQIA activist Gopi Shankar Madurai. The American College stands out as an exception in addressing these issues. Its B.A. programme in Tamil has an autobiography of a trans woman The Truth about Me: A Hijra Life Story by A. Revathi as part of the syllabus for final year students. In 2013 The American College under graduation English department included Funny Boy by Shyam Selvadurai as part of syllabus under gay literature and marginalized studies.

In 2009, Red Hen Press published a selection of Avvaiyar's poetry from the 12th century: Give, Eat, and Live: Poems by Avviyar. The poems were selected and translated into English by Thomas Pruiksma, a poet and translator who discovered Avviyar's work while on a Fulbright scholarship at The American College.

== Study Centre for Indian Literature in English and Translation (SCILET) ==
Study Centre for Indian Literature in English and Translation (SCILET) was founded by Rev. Dr. Paul L. Love in the early 1980s to show how important Indian literature in English had become. 'English Literature' no longer means just the literature of England. SCILET facilitates the translation of regional language writing into English, so that literature written in such aboriginal languages as Tamil, Malayalam, Kannada and Telugu can be read in all parts of the country. Love's teaching in India, which began with his appointment to overseas service with the Presbyterian Church (U.S.A.) in 1954, was interrupted periods of study and teaching. SCILET sponsors activities such as lectures, seminars and poetry readings that present some of the best of these writers in person, enabling teachers, students and the research community to interact and become acquainted with them. To further the cause of Indian literature in English, SCILET has developed several publications, the best known of which is its annual poetry journal, Kavya Bharati, which includes in equal amount the work of established Indian poets and promising new voices.

== Alliance Française, Madurai ==
Alliance Française offers courses for beginners and advanced learners in French through its satellite branch at Department of French, The American College. The communicative approach of the course helps a student to learn the language with effective and efficient use of modern techniques encouraging independent progress. Along with level A1 and A2 courses for beginners and those who have learnt the language already, the Madurai branch offers assistance to succeed in French language proficiency tests such as Diplome d'Etudes en Langue Française (DELF) and Diplôme Approfondi de Langue Française (DALF) for an internationally valid certificate.

== Exchange programme between American College and United States ==
A memorandum of understanding was signed in 2008 between The American College and the Appalachian State University, USA. Selected students of any discipline of the American College have the opportunity to pursue undergraduate or postgraduate study for six months to one year in the USA. Students are provided food and accommodation; they pay for airfare, visa and medical insurance. The programme enabled students to acquire first-hand experiences of cross-cultural living.

== New satellite campus ==
The American College has a new satellite campus at Chathrapatti, on the Madurai-Natham highway, to reach out to students and communities in rural Madurai. The new campus is located on Alagar hills. The campus will house both residential courses like M.B.A. and non-residential programmes in the near future. The additional campus will enable American College to grow exponentially thereby alleviating the space constraints in starting new courses in the emerging fields.

Branches of Study:

- Arts & Humanities wing
- Science wing
- Management Studies wing
- Research wing
- Co-curricular courses wing
- Teaching, learning and assessments wing

== Hostels ==
About a third of the students live in five halls on campus, one of which is for women. Up to eight to nine students live in a room. Each hall is under the care of a warden, assisted by resident young faculty. They are available for consultation and advice when needed.

The mess rates are kept between ₹2600–3000 per month; accommodation ₹26000 per year, affordable even to economically challenged students. Elected student representatives manage the mess, under a dividing system. There is no provision for special food even at extra cost.

- Rev. Washburn Hall: Named after Rev. G.T. Washburn, it is the first campus hostel of India. Washburn Hall is more than 100 years old and accommodates freshers. Washburn Hall had its origin in 1908, the year when the college was shifted to its present site. The ‘Main Hostel’, as the Washburn Hall was known, was constructed in three stages. The ground floor on the western side with side wings was the first stage; it was completed in 1909. The second stage was raising the first floor on the existing ground floor in 1914. The third and final stage of construction was the extension of the structures on the eastern side. The extension was started in late October 1916 and was completed in 1917. E.M. Flint was appointed as the warden in 1914. (Until then, principal Rev. Zumbro probably was the acting warden.) The first hostel day was celebrated on 19 February 1921 and the chief guest was Georges Clemenceau, ex-premier of France. In 1950, the name of the hostel was changed from 'Main Hostel' into 'Washburn Hall'.
- Rev.Zumbro Hall: Hon. Sir. C.P. Ramasamy Iyer, Law Member, Government of Madras laid the foundation stone for Zumbro memorial hostel built in memory of Rev. William Michael Zumbro on 5 September 1925. This hostel initially accommodated postgraduate students. After some time it was used by pre-university students. Presently this hall accommodates about 110 undergraduate self-financing students. J
- Wallace Hall: The foundation stone for Wallace Hall was laid on 21 January 1946 by Dr. Albert Bucker Coe, minister of Oak Park church, Illinois, U.S.A. Wallace Hall accommodated undergraduate students and was converted into a postgraduate students hall in the recent years. This hall houses 98 postgraduate students and two superintendents.
- Dudley Hall: The foundation stone for Dudley Hall was laid on 17 February 1956. It started functioning from the academic year 1957–58. Initially it was called New Hostel. After some years, it was renamed "Dudley Hall", after the name of the reverend, who had close connections with the hostel and the college.
- Women's Hall: The women's hall was the home for 81 students in 1961 and later increased to 128 students. Realizing the increasing demand for women's higher education the hall was extended by a building with 18 spacious rooms.

== Campus ==
Chapel at the Center of the college

Main Hall

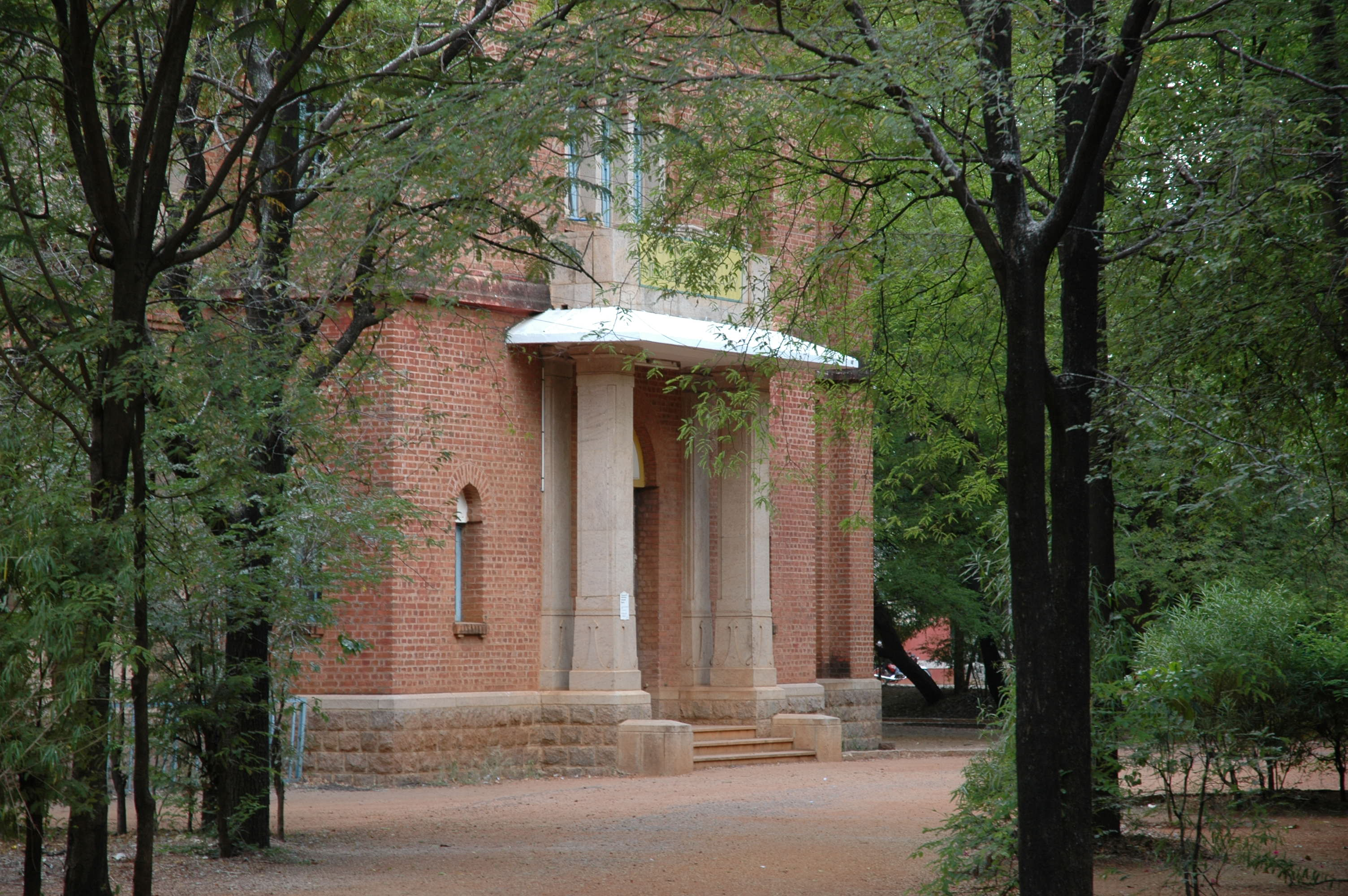
Daniel Poor Memorial Library

Main Gate, or Washburn Gate

== Annual Cultural Fest and Cultural Association ==
The Annual Cultural fest of The American College in India has existed since 1915.

- AMFEST is the annual cultural fest.
- AXIOMATICA : The Department of Mathematics conducts this Intercollegiate competition. Colleges from all over Tamil Nadu participate in this event.
- TYCOONS is the annual cultural festival conducted by the Department of BBA. It was previously a part of COMMAS but was soon separated.
- COMMAS: The Commerce association conducts an inter-college cultural event called the COMMAS every year for two days. Colleges from all over Tamil Nadu participate in this function. The success of this function is evident from the funds that are granted by the business community in and around Madurai.
- REPHISO: The Religion, Philosophy, and Sociology Association organizes national and international seminars under the banner of REPHISO. Intellectuals, philosophers, sociologists, and social activists around the globe participate. So far Swami Agnivesh, Aruna Roy, Medha Patkar, Prashant Bhushan, Harsh Mander are some of the notable philosophers and social activists who were guest of honor.
- PEGASUS: The English Department inter-college literary fiesta is famous for its drama, theater arts, street play. PEGASUS is also known as the Opera of Madurai.
- BYTES: The Department of Computer Science conducts this inter-collegiate IT symposium.
- HOVER: The Department of Computer Application conducts this intercollegiate meet.
- ICAS: The Department of Economics conducts this Intercollegiate competition.
- PHOBOS:The Department of Physics conducts this Intercollegiate competition. Colleges from all over Tamil Nadu participate in this event.
- CHEM-GLAZE:The Department of Chemistry Association conducts this Intercollegiate competition.
- PANORAMIA: The intercollegiate programme by the Dept of Visual Communication attracts galaxy of celebrities form the Tamil film industry. It is a mega inter collegiate programme and is unique in south Tamil Nadu.
- Kurinchi Vizha - குறிஞ்சி விழா:The intercollegiate programme by the department of tamil

== See also ==
- Daniel Poor Memorial Library in Madurai
- Daniel Poor

== Notable alumni ==
- Padma Bhushan Sir Kariamanickam Srinivasa Krishnan, FRS, co-discoverer of Raman scattering
- Padma Shri Govindappa Venkataswamy, Founder Aravind Eye Hospital
- Padma Bhushan Shiv Nadar, Founder HCL Technologies, Chairman Sri Sivasubramaniya Nadar College of Engineering and Shiv Nadar University
- Padma Shri Thota Tharani (Art Director)
- Padma Shri Vivek (actor)
- Ganapathy Baskaran, Shanti Swaroop Bhatnagar Awardee (Theoretical condensed matter physicist)
- Rajiah Simon, Shanti Swaroop Bhatnagar Awardee, (Optics, quantum computing)
- Komal Swaminathan (Congress Activist in his early years, a noted Tamil Theater personality, Film Director, journalist)
- V. Ramaswami (Former Justice of the Supreme Court of India)
- Bala (director)
- Mahendran (Film Director) Inspiration for the legends of Tamil Cinema like Mani Ratnam and Rajinikanth
- Geevarghese Mar Dioscoros (bishop of the Malankara Orthodox Syrian Church)
- P. Mohan (Indian politician and a member of the state unit of the Communist Party of India)
- Nedumaran (Tamil politician)
- Ram (Film-maker)
- A. G. S. Ram Babu (Indian politician and former Member of Parliament elected from Tamil Nadu.)
- Ramki (Film Director)
- Solomon Pappaiah (TV personality and Actor)
- Vijay Babu Film Producer, Actor, and Businessman Founder of the film production company Friday Film House
- Major Sundarrajan (Actor)
- Jacob Sahaya Kumar Aruni (Noted Indian celebrity chef)
- Karu Pazhaniappan (Tamil film director)
- Shanmugarajan (Actor)
- Jeyaraj (Renowned Artist)
- D. Sreeram Kumar (Major in the Indian Army)
- Pattimandram Raja (Actor, TV personality)
- Palani Kumanan – Investigative Journalist of The Wall Street Journal & Winner of Pulitzer Prize 2015.
- Gopi Shankar Madurai – Equal Rights Activist
- Justin Prabhakaran, (Indian film score and soundtrack composer)
- V Anantha Nageswaran, (Chief Economic advisor to the Government of India)
- Manohar Devadoss, (Indian artist and a writer)
