= Agathariruppu =

- Village
- Location in Tamil Nadu, India
- Coordinates: 9°26′24.9″N 78°25′48.5″E
- Country: India
- State: Tamil Nadu
- District: Ramanathapuram district
- Time zone: UTC+5:30 (IST)
- PIN: 623601
- Telephone code: 914576 XX

Agathariruppu is a village in Ramanathapuram district of the Indian state of Tamil Nadu. Agathariruppu falls under Abiramam town panchayat and Kamuthi Taluk.

== Demography ==
People from Agathariruppu are mostly settled outside for jobs and education. Overall resident population is less than 500.

== Festival ==
=== Yearly Mariamman Thiruvizha ===
Mariyamman Mulaipaari Festival celebrated annually, during this festival, the people settled in Chennai, Madurai and Ramanathapuram join.

=== Bullock cart pilgrim trip ===
People from Agathariruppu go for temple trip to M.Pudupatti/ Keela rajakula Raman rajapalayam near Sivakasi in Bullock cart, once in every four years (usually in May month), along with other people who belongs to Aarukarai Yadava community.

They travel for nearly 80 km in three days to worship Sri Ericheeswara Ponnirulappan Swami and Swami Koodamudaya Ayyanar and Kaali Amman

== Notable people ==
- Professor Chenna Pulavar Karmega Konar was born in this village.
