= 90 Field Regiment (India) =

Indian Army artillery unit

- Active: 1965 – present
- Country: India
- Allegiance: India
- Branch: Indian Army
- Type: Artillery
- Size: Regiment
- Nickname(s): Nineo’s
- Motto(s): Sarvatra, Izzat-O-Iqbal (Everywhere with Honour and Glory)
- Colors: Red & Navy Blue
- Anniversaries: 15 April – Raising Day
- Equipment: Indian Field Gun

Insignia
- Abbreviation: 90 Fd Regt

90 Field Regiment is part of the Regiment of Artillery of the Indian Army.

== Formation and history ==
The regiment was raised as 90 Mountain (Composite) Regiment on 15 April 1965 at Mathura, Uttar Pradesh. Its three batteries were 901, 902 and 903 mountain batteries. The first commanding officer was Lieutenant Colonel Rana Pratap Singh. The regiment was equipped with 3.7 inch mountain howitzers and 25 pounders. It is presently equipped with the 105 mm Indian field gun. The regiment was for a short period converted to a medium regiment, before returning back as a field regiment.

Shortly after its raising, the regiment moved to Deolali after the 1965 war. It was here, where it was converted to 75/24 pack howitzers. The unit then moved to Lohitpur, Arunachal Pradesh under 2 Mountain Artillery Brigade, but was operationally under 82 Mountain Brigade of 2 Mountain Division.

== Operations ==
The regiment has taken part in the following operations –

Indo-Pakistani War of 1971

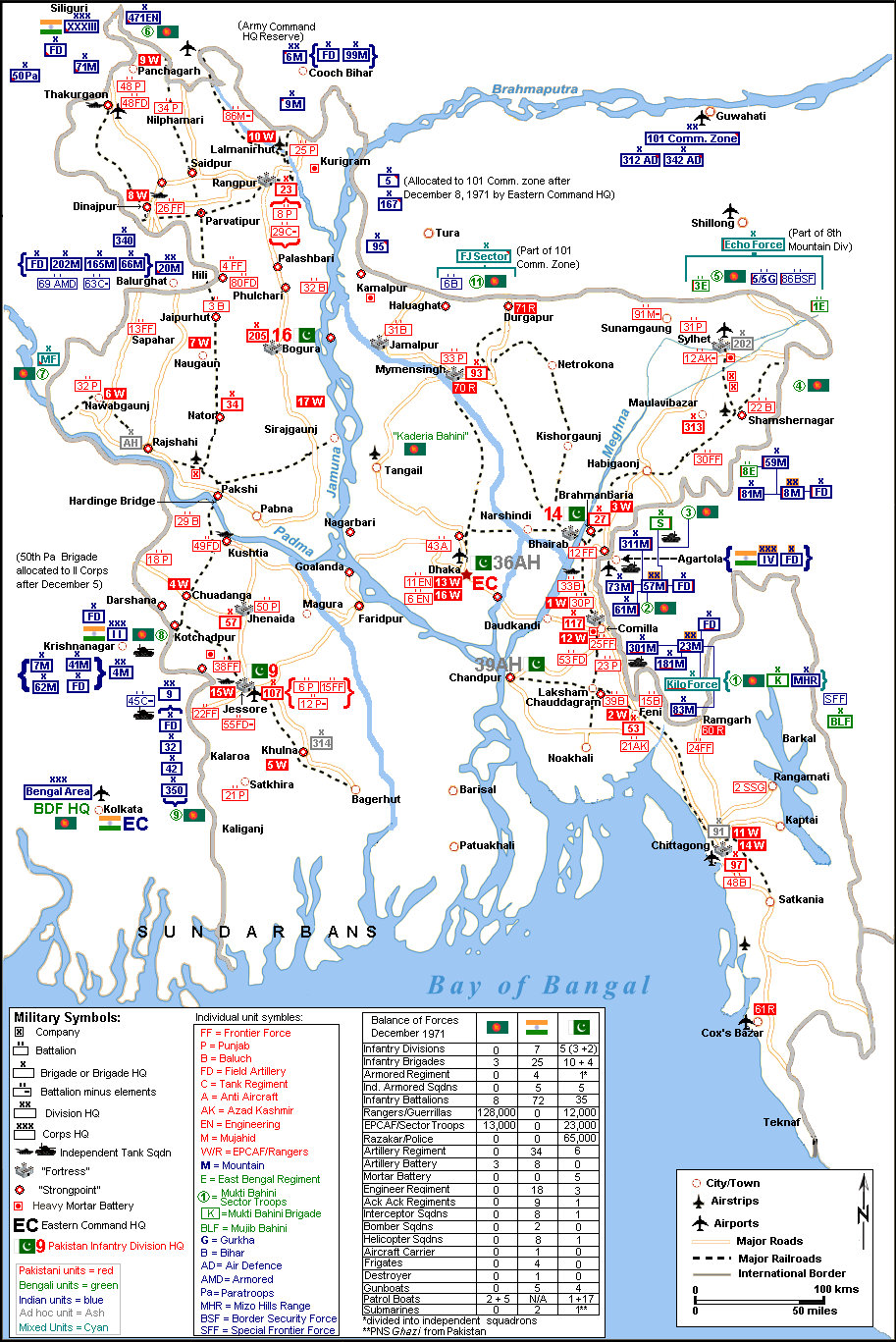
Deployment of troops in the eastern sector during the 1971 war

The regiment took part in Operation Cactus Lily in the Eastern Sector (present day Bangladesh). It was commanded by Lieutenant Colonel (later Lieutenant General) VP Gupta and equipped with 75/24 guns. The regiment moved out from Lohitpur before the war. At the onset of operations (3 December 1971), headquarters battery and 901 battery were under Kilo Force at Belonia in Tripura, 902 battery was under 101 Communication Zone at Dawki and Muktāpur, both in Meghalaya and 903 battery was at Karimganj, Assam under Echo Force. The regiment saw action in the north-eastern sector in the Shillong – Sylhet axis. The regiment provided artillery support and also used guns in direct supporting role.

The regiment lost Gunner (ORA) Shiv Kumar Sharma during the operations on 7 December 1971. The regiment was awarded one Sena Medal and one Mention in Despatches. The unit bought back a few souvenirs from the war, which included a Pakistani artillery gun.

Operation Vijay

The regiment was in the Rann of Kutch in 1999-2000 during the Kargil War.

Operation Parakram

During this standoff with Pakistan, the regiment was present in the Rann of Kutch.

Operation Sahayta

The regiment took part in rescue and relief operation in the aftermath of the Bhuj earthquake in 2001. It was awarded the General Officer in Command’s (Southern Command) Unit Citation for its efforts.

== War Cry ==
The war cry of the regiment is ‘दुर्गा माता की जय’ (Durga Mata Ki Jai), which translates to ‘Victory to Goddess Durga’.

== Gallantry awards ==
The regiment has won the following gallantry awards –

- Ashoka Chakra – Major D. Sreeram Kumar during his tenure with 39 Assam Rifles.
- Sena Medal (SM) – 3 (Major Eustace William Fernandez, Colonel Fateh Singh Karamsot, Lance Naik Naseeb Kumar)
- Mention in Despatches – 1 (Captain AA Ali)
- Vishisht Seva Medal (VSM) – 1 (Havildar Laishram Devendro Singh)
- Chief of Army Staff Commendation cards – 13
- General Officer Commanding-in-chief Commendation cards – 18

== Notable officers ==
The regiment has produced the following general rank officers-

- Major General SB Singh – the second commanding officer of the regiment.
- Lieutenant General Ved Prakash Gupta – the third commanding officer of the regiment, Commandant of the Indian Military Academy between November 1986 to December 1988 and Colonel Commandant, Regiment of Artillery.
- Major General Eustace William Fernandez SM.
- Major General JU Matai.
- Lieutenant General Anup Singh Jamwal PVSM, AVSM, VSM, ADC – GOC of 4 Corps and 9 Corps and later Adjutant-General.
- Major General GS Talwar – commanded the unit during Operation Parakram.

== Other achievements ==
- Devendro Singh of the regiment in an acclaimed boxer, who competes in the light-flyweight division. He reached the quarter-finals of the 2011 World Amateur Boxing Championships in Baku, represented India at the 2012 Summer Olympics, won the silver medal at the Asian Confederation Boxing Championship in 2013 and the silver medal at the 2014 Commonwealth Games. He has been awarded with the COAS Commendation Card and Vishisht Seva Medal.

== See also ==
- List of artillery regiments of Indian Army
