= Karmegha Konar =

Karmega Konar
- Born: 27 December 1889; Agathariruppu, Ramanathapuram district, India
- Died: 22 October 1957 (aged 67)
- Other name: Chennaa Pulavar
- Occupation: Scholar
- Known for: Education and Poetry
- Spouse: Padmashini
- Parent(s): Ayarpadi Konar and Irulayiammaal

Karmegha Konar (27 December 1889 – 22 October 1957) was a popular Tamil poet and educator. He is colloquially known as Chennaa Pulavar, a title given to him by his peer and close friend Bharathidasan.

He was the Chairman of the Tamil department at The American College in Madurai.

== Early life ==
Karmega Konar was born to U. Ayarpadi Konar and Irulayiammaal in Agathariruppu village near Abiramam in Ramanathapuram district. In 1904 he enrolled in Madurai fourth Tamil sangam. In 1912 Vallal Pandiduraithevar awarded him a Gold Medal for scoring top mark in the Pandithar examination.

== Career ==
In 1914 he joined Madurai American college to head the Department of Indian languages. He worked in the Department of Tamil for 37 years. Notable students who studied under him include: Shankaraiah (freedom fighter and Marxist Communist Tamil Nadu state secretary), V. Thillainayagam (Director of Tamil Nadu Public Library department), Krishnammal Jeganathan (land reformation fighter) and K. Lakshmikanthan Bharathi (government secretary).

In 1916 he started "Parimelazhaghar Kazhagam" for research in Thirukkural.
In 1924 he released his first book Nallisai pulavargal, which is included in Chennai, Annamalai, Trivancore and Mysore universities.

In 1946 he became a member in the Chennai government employment corporation
He headed the Chennai University curriculum group.

== Personal life ==
In 1912 he married Padmashini Ammaiyar and moved to Madurai. He retired from American college Madurai in 1951.

== Recognition ==
In 1955 Tamilvel P.T.Rajan and Navalar. Somasundarabharatiyar titled him as "Senna Pulavar".

== Writings ==
Below are books written by Karmega Konar

1. அறிவு நூல் திரட்டு (2 தொகுதிகள் - உரைநூல்)
2. ஆபுத்திரன் அல்லது புண்ணியராஜன் (உரைநூல்)
3. இதிகாசக் கதாவாசகம் (2 தொகுதிகள்)
4. ஐங்குறு நூற்றுச் சொற்பொழிவுகள்
5. ஒட்டக்கூத்தர்
6. கண்ணகி தேவி
7. காப்பியக் கதைகள்
8. கார்மேகக் கோனார் கட்டுரைகள்
9. கார்மேகக் கோனார் கவிதைகள்
10. செந்தமிழ் இலக்கியத்திரட்டு I
11. பாலபோத இலக்கணம்
12. மதுரைக் காஞ்சி
13. மலைபடுகடாம் ஆராய்ச்சி
14. மூவருலா ஆராய்ச்சி
15. தமிழ்ச்சங்க வரலாறு (கட்டுரை)
16. தமிழ்மொழியின் மறுமலர்ச்சி
17. நல்லிசைப் புலவர்கள் (உரைநூல்)

The Tamil Nadu government has nationalised his books.
