= Kavya Bharati =

Annual Indian literary magazine

Kavya Bharati is an annual literary journal. Its primary language is English and also includes translations from Indian languages translated into English.

== Objective ==
Kavya Bharati is published by SCILET: The Study Centre for Indian Literature in English and Translation at American College, Madurai, India. SCILET in the early 1980s in order to show how important Indian literature in English had already become. ‘English Literature’ no longer means just the literature of England. New literatures in English have sprung up in many parts of the world, and India is one of the major places where this is happening. The editor in chief is R. P. Nair on behalf of the Study Centre for Indian Literature in English and Translation at Madurai, Tamil Nadu, India.

== Overview ==
It has digitized the issues of literary journal Kavya Bharati : a review of Indian poetry which begins the first issue published in 1988. It has remained steady as a strong literary journal since then as annual issues.

== See also ==
- American College, Madurai
