= Daniel Poor Memorial Library in Madurai =

Daniel Poor Memorial
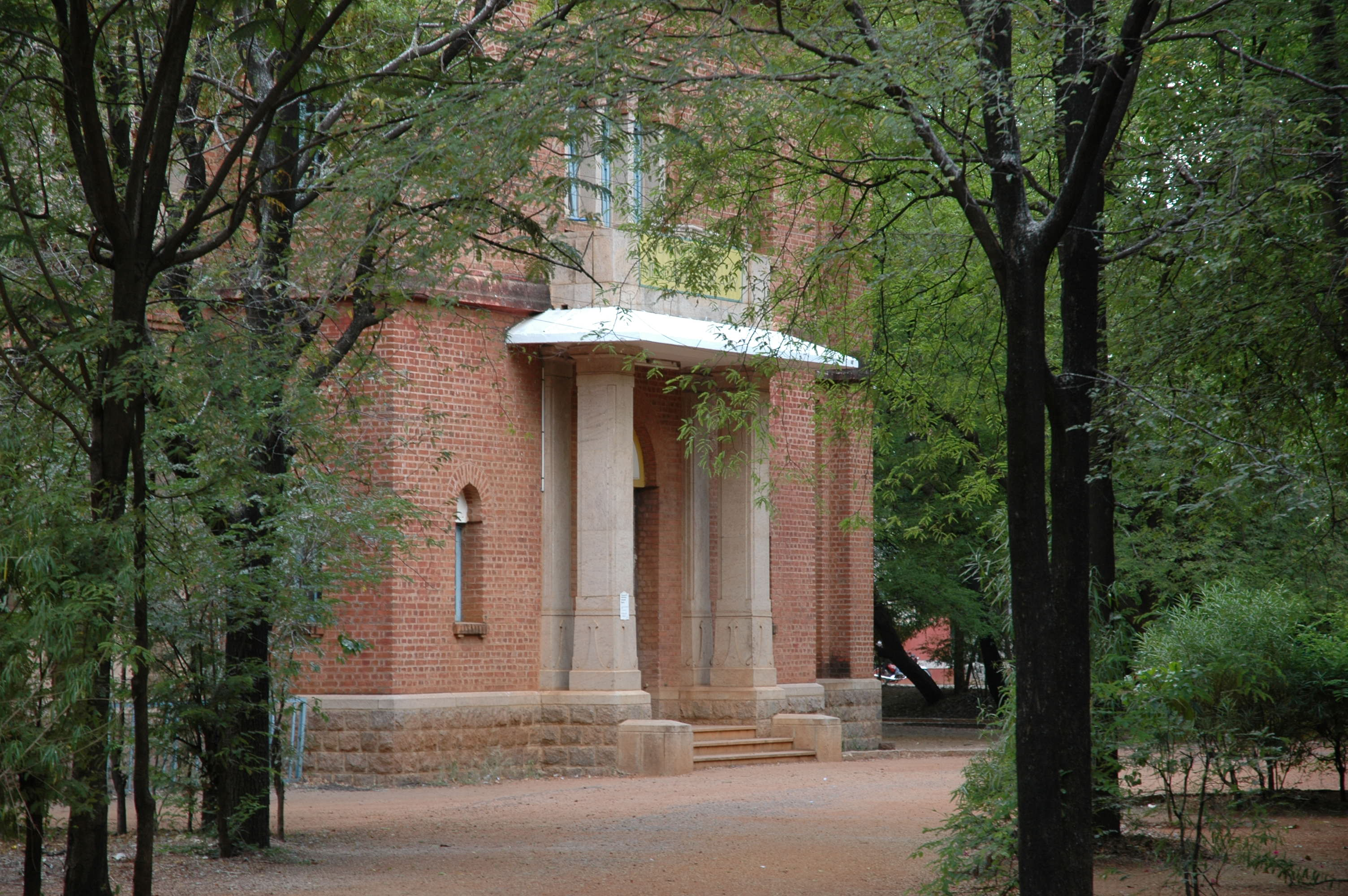
- 9.929355°N 78.132073°E
- Location: Madurai, Tamil Nadu, India
- Established: 28 June 1915

Daniel Poor Memorial Library often abbreviated as DPM Library is a century old college central library of the American College, Madurai, Tamil Nadu in India that officially began its functions on June 28, 1915.

== History ==
Samuel A Morman, the granddaughter of Dr. Daniel Poor, was the key person to build the library building by donating $25,000 to the American Board of Missionaries on January 26, 1926. Between 1914 and 1920, J. A. Sanders was the first librarian. The stack room at the library houses more than 76,000 volumes.

== Collections ==
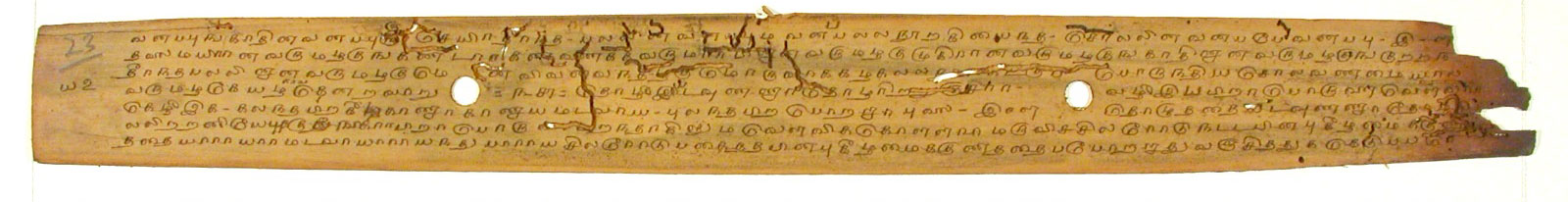
A palm leaf manuscript with ancient Tamil text in DPM

The library holds archaeological artifacts and ancient coins of Pandyan Dynasty, Cholas as well. Many ancient palm leaf script copies like Tiruvacakam, Manimekalai are also archived.

Correspondence between the Indian Government and The American Missionaries, wood carvings from Nayak period, five metal bronze statues of Vishnu and other Hindu gods, Indonesian wood carvings and wooden statues are in the collections.
