= D. Sreeram Kumar =

Ashoka Chakra recipient

Colonel D. Sreeram Kumar AC
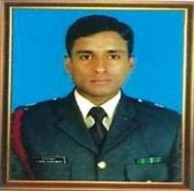
- Portrait of Maj (now Col) D. Sreeram Kumar
- Born: 11 January 1981 (age 45); Kovilpatti, Tamil Nadu, India
- Military career
- Allegiance: India
- Branch: Indian Army
- Service years: 2004–present
- Rank: Colonel
- Service number: SS-40576 (Short-service commission); IC-66076A (Regular commission)
- Units: 90 Medium Regiment (Regiment of Artillery); 39 Assam Rifles
- Conflicts: Insurgency in Northeast India; Insurgency in Arunachal Pradesh; Insurgency in Manipur
- Awards: Ashoka Chakra

D. Sreeram Kumar, AC (born 11 January 1981) is a commissioned officer in the Indian Army. In 2010, he was awarded the Ashoka Chakra, India's highest peacetime gallantry decoration.

== Early life ==
Sreeram Kumar was born in Kovilpatti, Thoothukudi district, Tamil Nadu. He completed his schooling from Sainik School, Amaravathinagar in 1998. He completed his under graduation from The American College in Madurai.

== Army career ==
=== Early career ===
Sreeram Kumar joined the Officers Training Academy, Chennai in October 2002 and received a short-service commission in 90 Medium Regiment (Artillery) on 20 March 2004, with the rank of lieutenant. On 20 March 2009, he received a regular commission (seniority from 20 October 2004) with the service number IC-66076A, and was promoted captain on 20 October 2006. Promoted acting major on 24 August 2008, he served with 39 Assam Rifles in Arunachal Pradesh (Operation Orchid) and later in Manipur (Operation Hifazat).

=== Ashoka Chakra ===
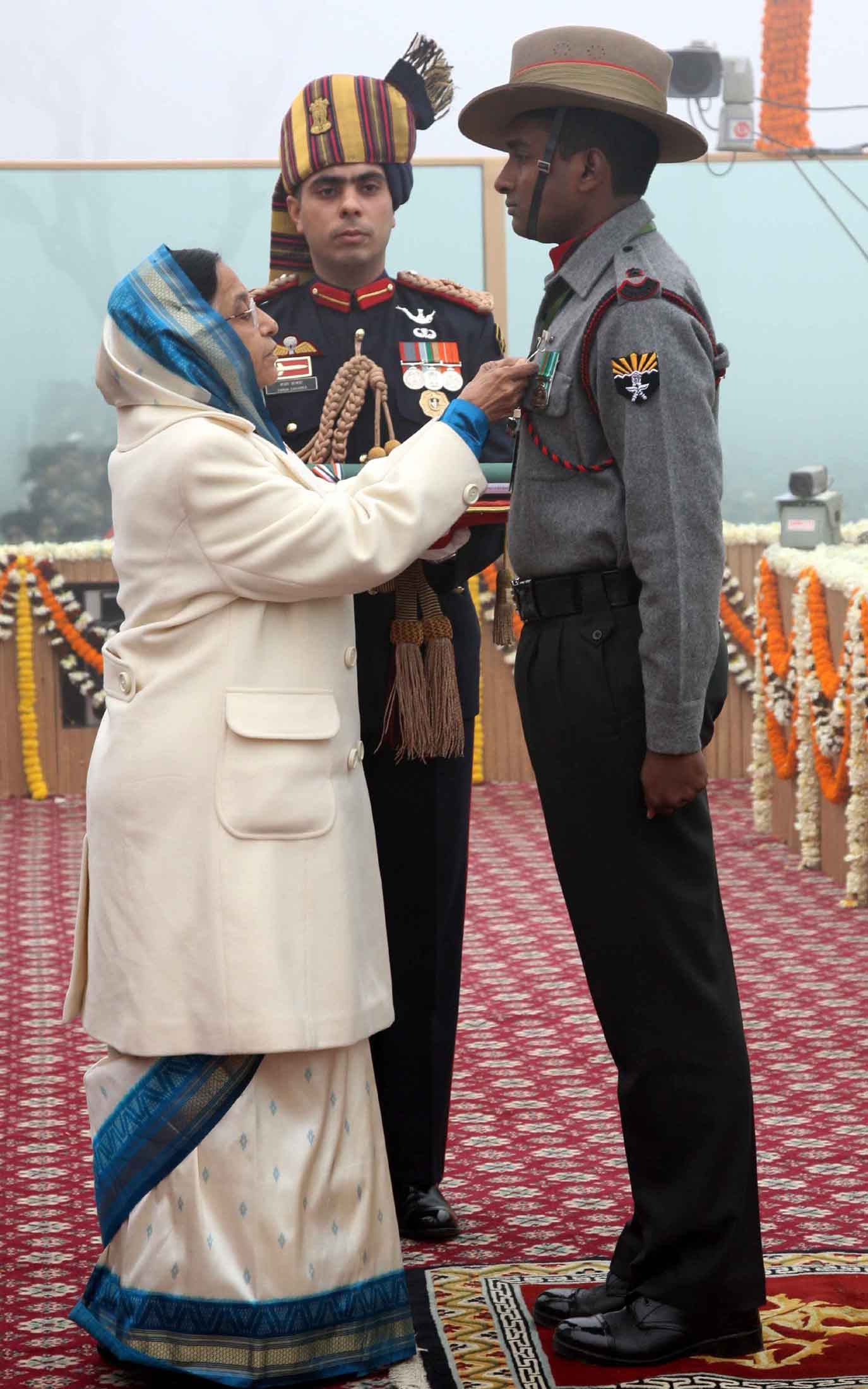
Sreeram Kumar receives the Ashoka Chakra from Indian president Pratibha Patil on 26 January 2010.

In 2010, Sreeram Kumar was awarded the Ashoka Chakra, India's highest peacetime gallantry decoration.

A brief about the action reads:

On 23 Oct 08, at 1730 hrs after obtaining explicit intelligence regarding presence of 10–15 armed terrorists at village Heingang Heibi Makhong, Imphal East District, Maj D Sreeram Kumar launched ops to eliminate the terrorists. Reaching the site, he laid multiple ambushes on the escape routes of the terrorists.

Around 1830hrs, the section under Maj D Sreeram Kumar observed suspicious movement of armed terrorists moving towards the nearby ridge on being challenged, the terrorists opened indiscriminate heavy automatic fire and pinned down the section. The officer miraculously missed certain death but showing exemplary courage and presence of mind, engaged the terrorists with accurate fire and killed two terrorists on the spot.

In the ensuring fierce encounter upholding the traditions of the Indian Army, showing leadership of the highest order and unmindful of personal safety, Maj D Sreeram Kumar directed his buddy to provide covering fire and with utter disregard to his own safety dashed down and closed in crawling and killed the two terrorists at point blank range. A fifth terrorist was killed by his buddy after vigorous search.

For displaying inspirational leadership, conspicuous gallantry under hostile fire and single handled eliminating four terrorists, Maj D Sreeram Kumar was awarded ‘Ashok Chakra’ on the occasion of the Independence Day 09.

=== Subsequent career ===
Kumar received a substantive promotion to major on 20 October 2010, with promotion to lieutenant-colonel on 20 October 2017. On 31 January 2021, he was promoted to colonel (by selection), with seniority from 26 October 2019. He later went on to command 90 Medium Regiment and was later selected for Higher Command course at Army War Collage Mhow. He is currently posted in Southern Command

== Controversy ==
In March 2013, a Supreme Court judicial commission ruled the killing of cousins Gobind and Nobo Meitei in the Langol area of Imphal to have been a staged encounter. The killings took place on 4 April 2009, and involved a joint team of local police and a unit of 39 Assam Rifles commanded by Kumar. While official statements from the paramilitary forces were that the cousins had opened fire when challenged and had been killed in response, the judicial panel concluded that based on medical evidence and witness testimonies, the action was "not an encounter but an operation by the security forces wherein death of the victims was caused knowingly".

Referring to the encounter, in which 89 rounds were fired at the pair, Kumar was reported as saying the encounter had been genuine, and that his understanding was "when a person is warned by the security forces and if he reacts by firing, such a person is a hardcore terrorist."

On 14 July 2017, the Supreme Court directed the Central Bureau of Investigation (CBI) to conduct a probe into several extrajudicial killings in Manipur, including the case in which Kumar was implicated.
