= 2005 Japanese architectural forgery scandal =

Falsification of building safety records

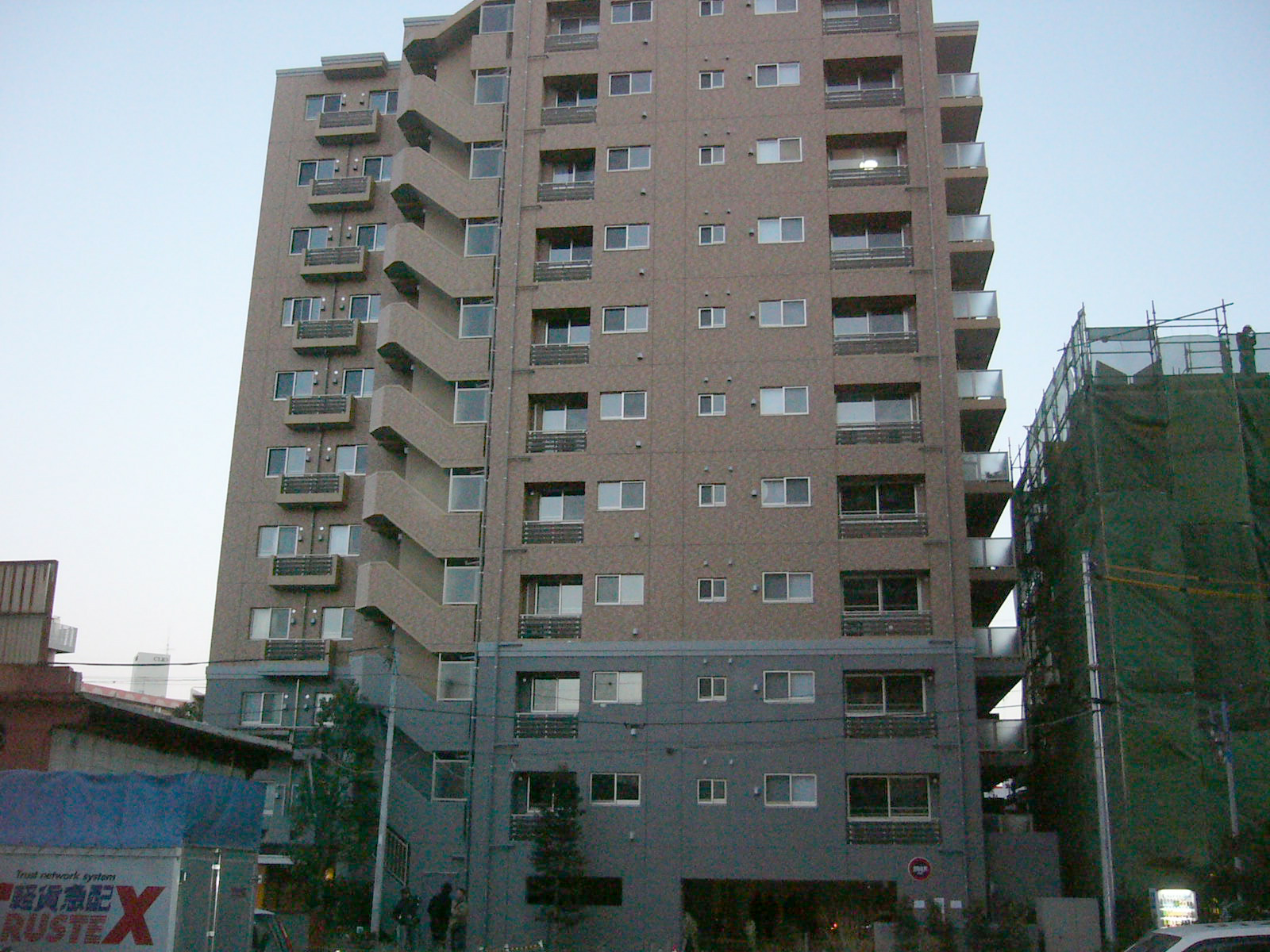
Condominium called "Grand Stage Fujisawa" in Fujisawa, Kanagawa Prefecture which Hidetsugu Aneha forged the construction accounting statement

On November 17, 2005, the Ministry of Land, Infrastructure and Transport in Japan announced that structural engineer Hidetsugu Aneha of Aneha Architectural Design Office in Chiba Prefecture had falsified earthquake design calculations, setting off a scandal dubbed in Japanese media as the "structural calculation forgery problem" (構造計算書偽造問題, kōzō keisansho gizō mondai).

== History ==
Hidetsugu Aneha, Moriyoshi Kimura, Akira Shinozuka and Togo Fujita etc. were arrested on April 26, 2006, and Huser's president Susumu Ojima was arrested on May 17 of the same year and convicted in September 2007.

In Japan, the incident was first publicized by bloggers. A number of Japanese construction and real estate companies declared bankruptcy due to their involvement in the affair, including Kimura Construction and Huser.

One of the causes for the problem was that the (privately owned) oversight agencies responsible for confirming compliance to Japanese safety standards did not detect the forgery. By law, structural engineers designing structures exceeding a certain floor area or number of storeys must submit drawings and calculations to the authorities, demonstrating that the building is safe (e.g. earthquake-resistant, etc.) Prior to 1999, oversight was managed solely by regional governments, however, a change made to Japanese law that year allowed private organizations to conduct investigations as well. It was said that these private organizations, such as EHomes and Nihon ERI, did not adequately function in their oversight roles; however, it was later revealed that government oversight agencies had also failed to detect some instances of forgery.

Of 14 hotels already been built when the problem first came to light, two were shown to fail Japan's earthquake resistance standards. Because the concrete had insufficient reinforcing steel, there was a fear that an earthquake of magnitude 5 on the Japanese Shindo scale could cause the buildings to collapse. None of the buildings in question have yet collapsed, but the safety of high-rise buildings in earthquake-prone Japan has been called into question, particularly in the light of the 1995 Sampoong Department Store collapse in Korea.

Residents of the areas around the affected buildings worried that the buildings would collapse. Some hotels, unable to guarantee the safety of their customers, ceased operations.
