= Manohar Devadoss =

Indian painter and writer (1936–2022)

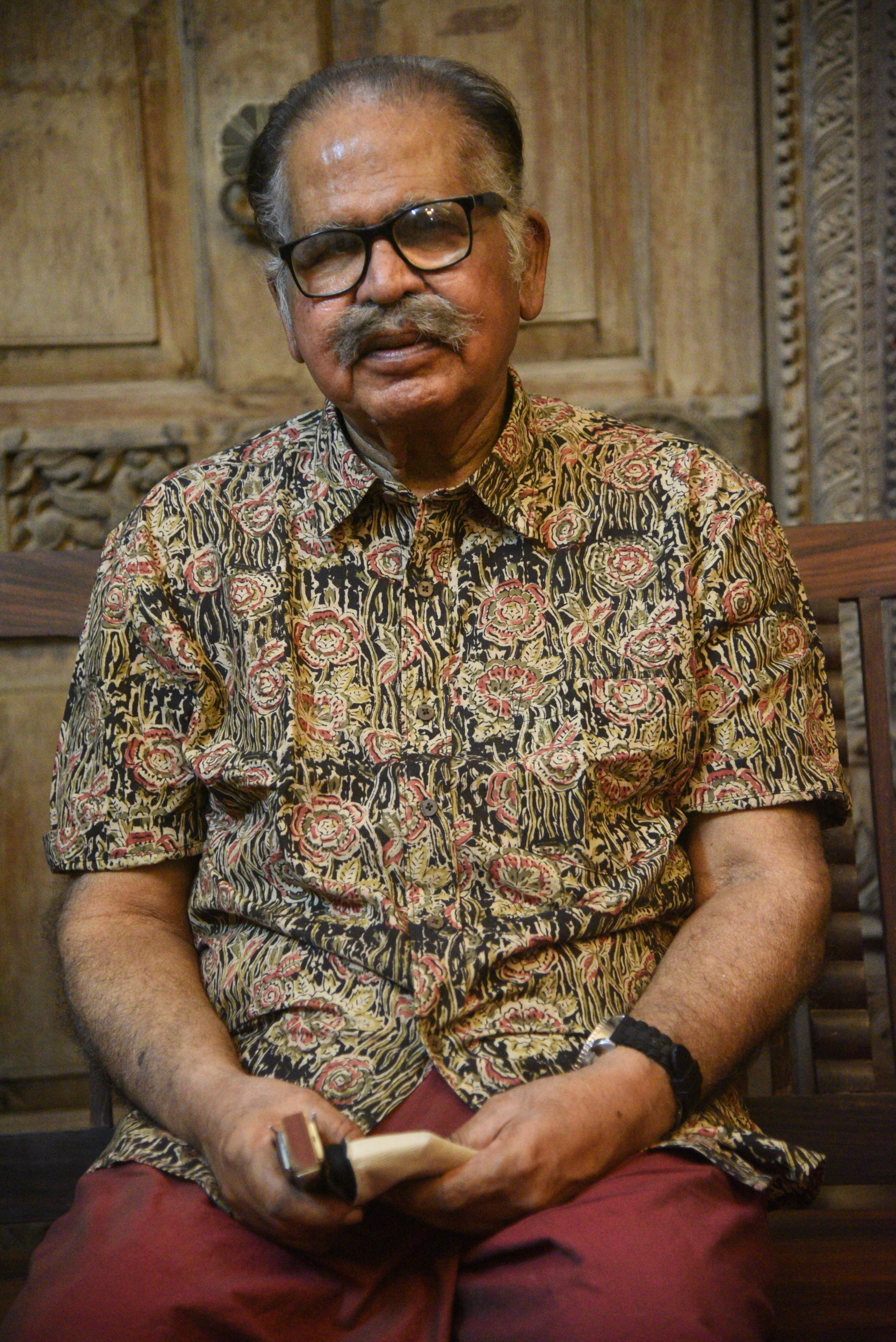
- Devadoss in 2021
- Born: Manohar Devadoss; 10 September 1936; Madurai, Madras Presidency, British India
- Died: 7 December 2022 (aged 86); Chennai, Tamil Nadu, India
- Education: American College of Madurai (BSc) in 1957, Oberlin College (AM) in 1972
- Known for: Art, Writing, Charity
- Spouse: Mahema Devadoss
- Children: 1
- Awards: Padma Shri (2020)

Manohar Devadoss (10 September 1936 – 7 December 2022) was an Indian artist and a writer from Tamil Nadu. At the age of 83, when completely blind, he was awarded the Padma Shri, India's fourth highest civilian award, for his inspirational work in art and charity.

== Early life ==
Devadoss was born on 10 September 1936, in Madurai, Tamil Nadu, which was then part of the Madras Presidency of British India, to Harry Jesudasan Masilamani, a doctor, and Cynthia Masilamani (née Devadoss), a granddaughter of M.L. Pillai. He lived in the Goripalayam neighborhood of Madurai until 1943. After spending two years in Kottaiyur and Madras (now Chennai), his family moved back to Madurai when he was eight. At the age of 12, he realised that his eyesight was gradually degenerating, a result of a condition that was diagnosed years later as retinitis pigmentosa. He completed his secondary education in 1953 at Sethupatti High School, where he excelled at Art and Chemistry.

== Career ==
Devadoss started drawing seriously when he was in sixth standard, but initially pursued a career in chemistry rather than art. He studied at American College in Madurai, completing a Bachelor of Science in chemistry in 1957. That year, his father died of a heart attack, and he was forced to begin work at the district collector's office as an accountant in order to support his family, as his elder brother was doing a master's degree and his younger brother was still in middle school.

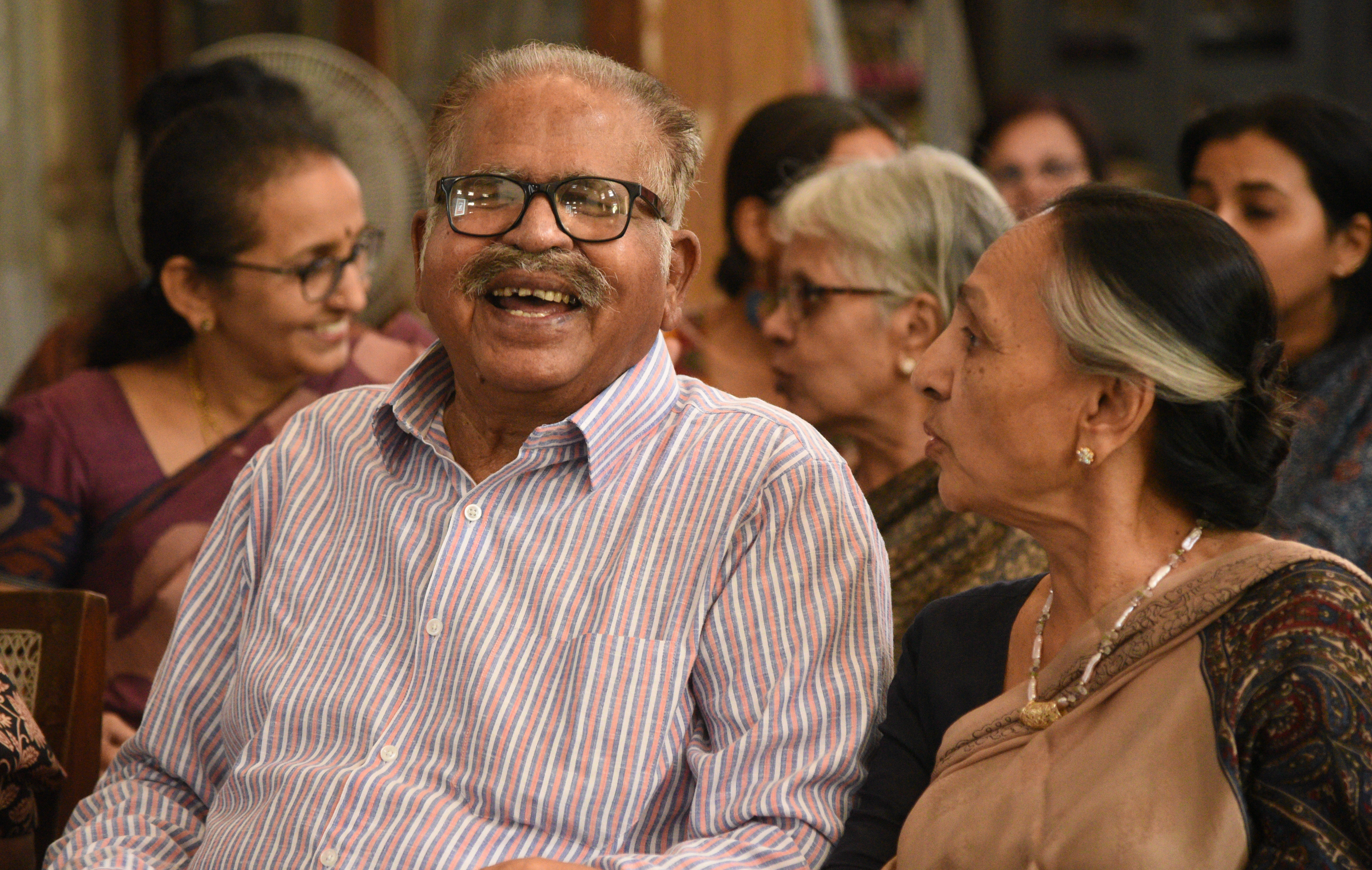
Manohar Devadoss meeting with his fans and friends at Chennai

After a few months working as an accountant, he received an offer from Oldham's, a British corporation manufacturing batteries, which had a factory in Madras. It would later become Standard Batteries, after a merger in 1971. He would work for them for the next forty years, designing new models of miners' cap-lamps and of lead acid batteries and became a recognized expert across India in the latter. In 1969, he left for the US to study for a master's in Chemistry at Oberlin College in Ohio on a scholarship, staying there with his wife and young daughter for three years and working as a lab instructor as part of a work-study program. In 1972, he returned to India after completing his master's degree, and continued to work for Standard Batteries.

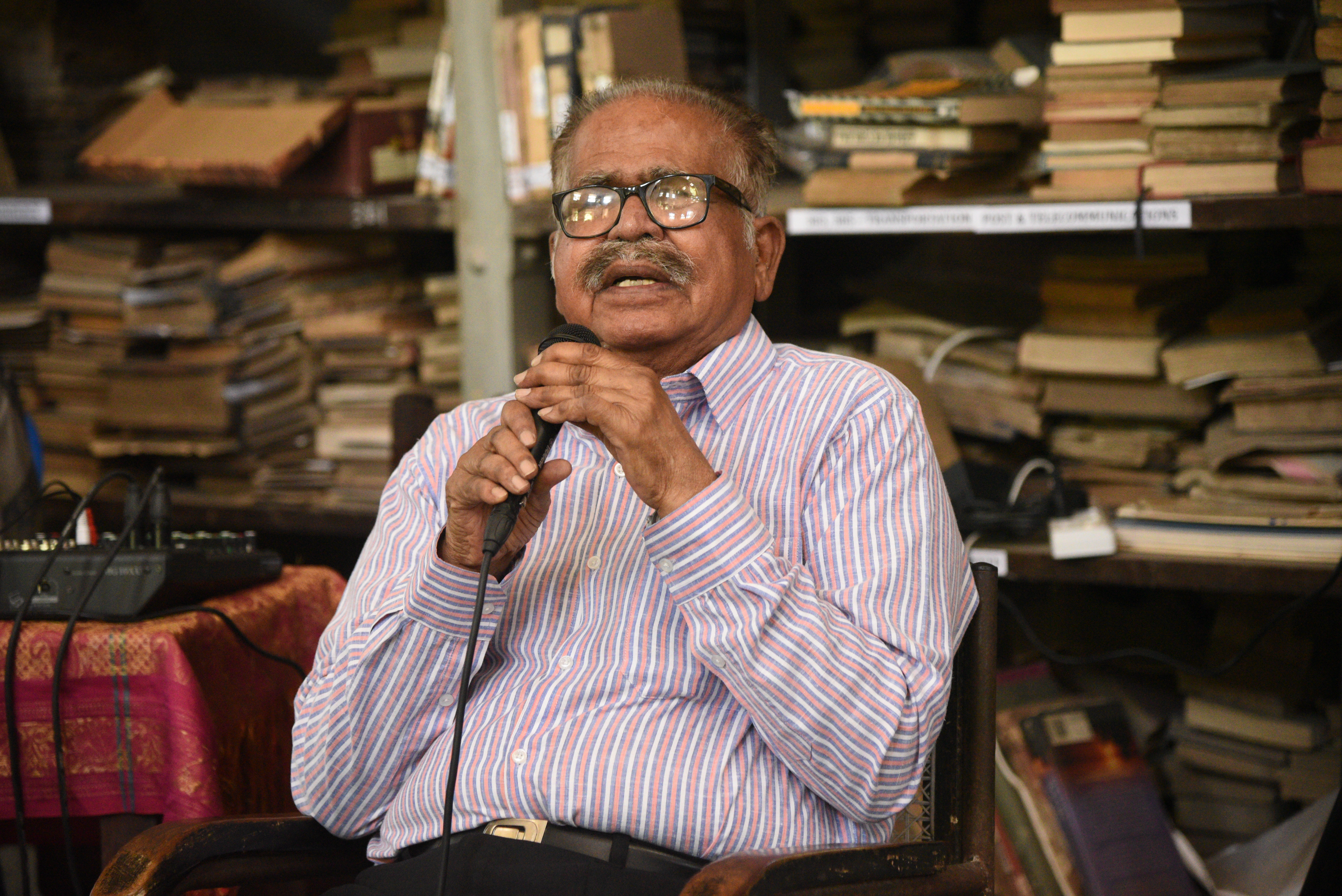
Manohar Devadoss speaking with his fans and friends

Completely self-taught, he drew and painted as a hobby, but his talent was soon noted and he began to sell his works to raise money for charity. In 1969, he began a series of annual 'Heritage Greeting Cards' during the holiday season, which included his own original drawings of South Indian heritage monuments and landscapes as well as a write-up by his wife Mahema about the featured scene. They were sold to individuals as well as companies, and became quite sought after. All proceeds of the sales went to charity. He helped support Shankara Netralya and Arvind Eye Hospital, both award-winning research hospitals that offered free eye care to low-income patients in Tamil Nadu.

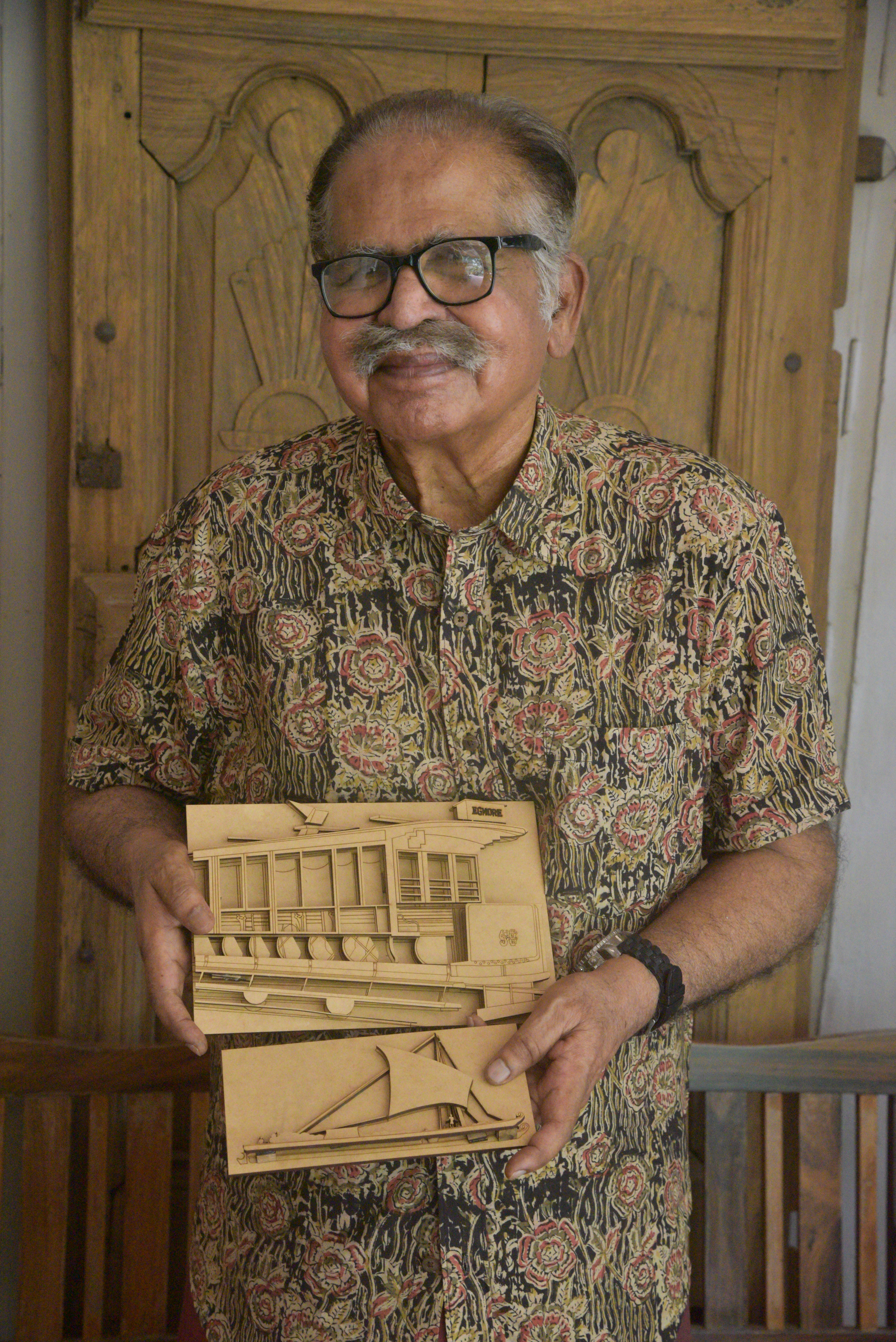
Manohar Devadoss holding laser cut models made by Ar. Vidhya Lakshmi Rajasekar inspired from his drawings of Madaras

He retired from Standard Batteries in 1997. That same year, with business partners, he set up his own battery manufacturing company, Compact Power Sources, which they sold for a profit in 2000. After his retirement, he began to write books, and had published eight as of 2021. He continued to draw until 2018, when he stopped due to his complete loss of eyesight. He continued to support charitable activities throughout. In 2020, he received the Padma Shri Award from the President of India for his work in charity and art. For many years, he would give talks to groups of people to motivate and inspire them.

== Personal life and death ==
In 1963, Manohar Devadoss married Mahema Michael (1940–2008), who was herself an accomplished artist. She taught him the technique of oil painting, although he had already mastered watercolor painting on his own. In 1966, their daughter Sujatha was born. In December 1972, soon after their return from the United States, a car accident caused by an irresponsible truck driver on the road between Madras and Madurai left Mahema paralyzed from the neck down. Meanwhile, Devadoss began to lose his eyesight ever more rapidly, due to retinitis pigmentosa. He nevertheless continued to work a full-time job at Standard Batteries to support the family, while working on art in his spare time. He made a name for himself as a painter and photographer, until his eye condition took away his color vision and he transitioned to pen-and-ink drawings, since he could see the contrast of the black line on the white paper better.

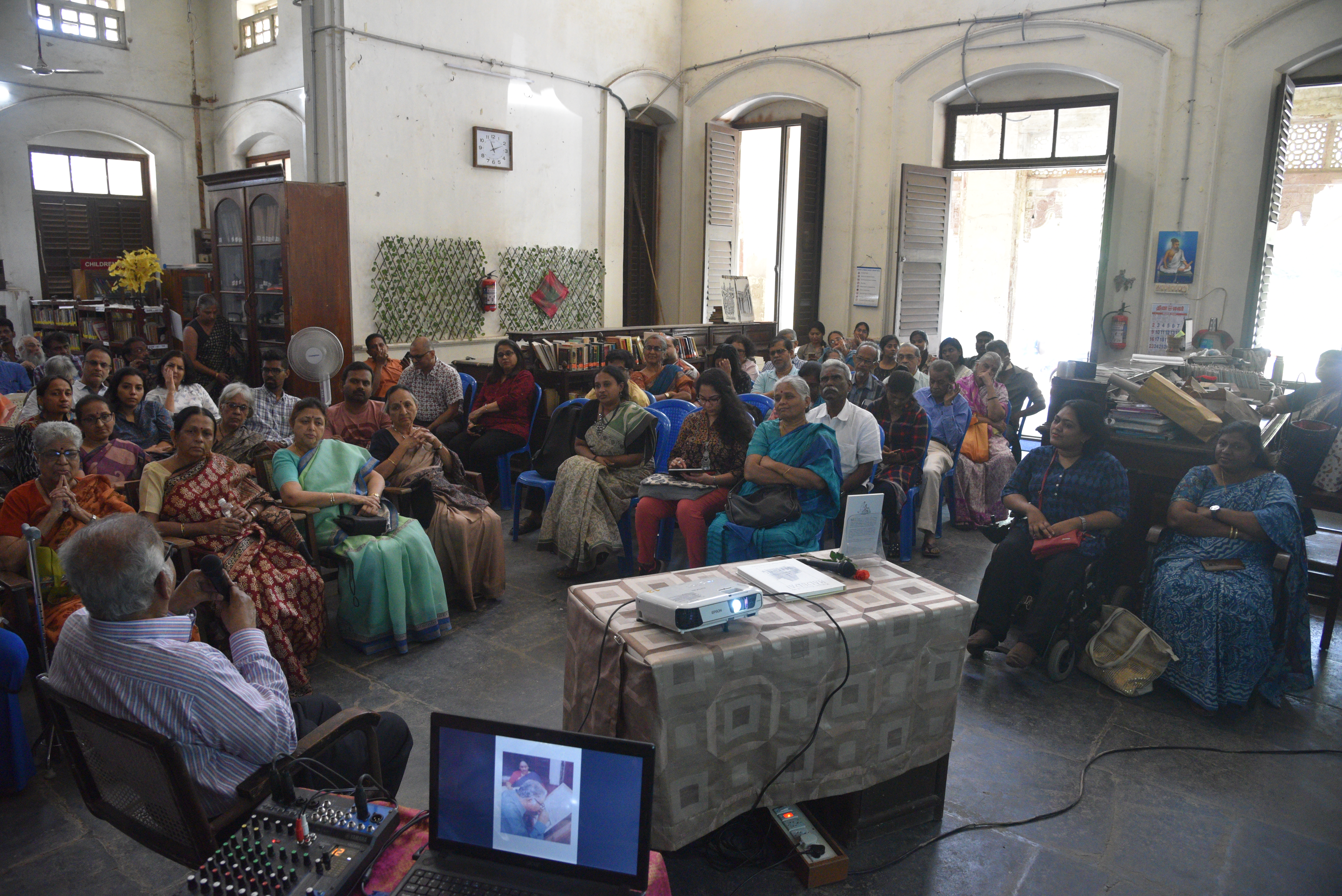
Manohar Devadoss meeting with his fans and friends at MLS, Chennai.

He innovated techniques to compensate for his declining eyesight, while providing care for his quadriplegic wife, even managing to take her on outings and generally lead a joyful life. His books deal with themes of how the city of Madurai shaped him during his happy childhood, and of ways to find resilience and innovative solutions to life's problems. Many find his books inspirational.

Following the death of his wife in 2008, he established a charitable fund in her name, placing it under the control of the Arvind Eye Hospital. Called the Mahema Devadoss Endowment, he seeded his personal funds into it. It has received donations from others as well. It continues to support medical cures for treatable blindness among rural populations.

Devadoss died on 7 December 2022, at the age of 86.

== Books ==
- Green Well Years
- Dreams Seasons and Promises
- A Poem to Courage
- Multiple Facets of my Madurai
- Enathu Madurai Ninaivugal (translation of Green Well Years into Tamil)
- From an Artist's Perspective
- Mahe and Mano; Challenges, Resilience, and Triumphs
- Madras Inked: Impressions of an Artist and an Architect (co-authored with Sujatha Shankar)

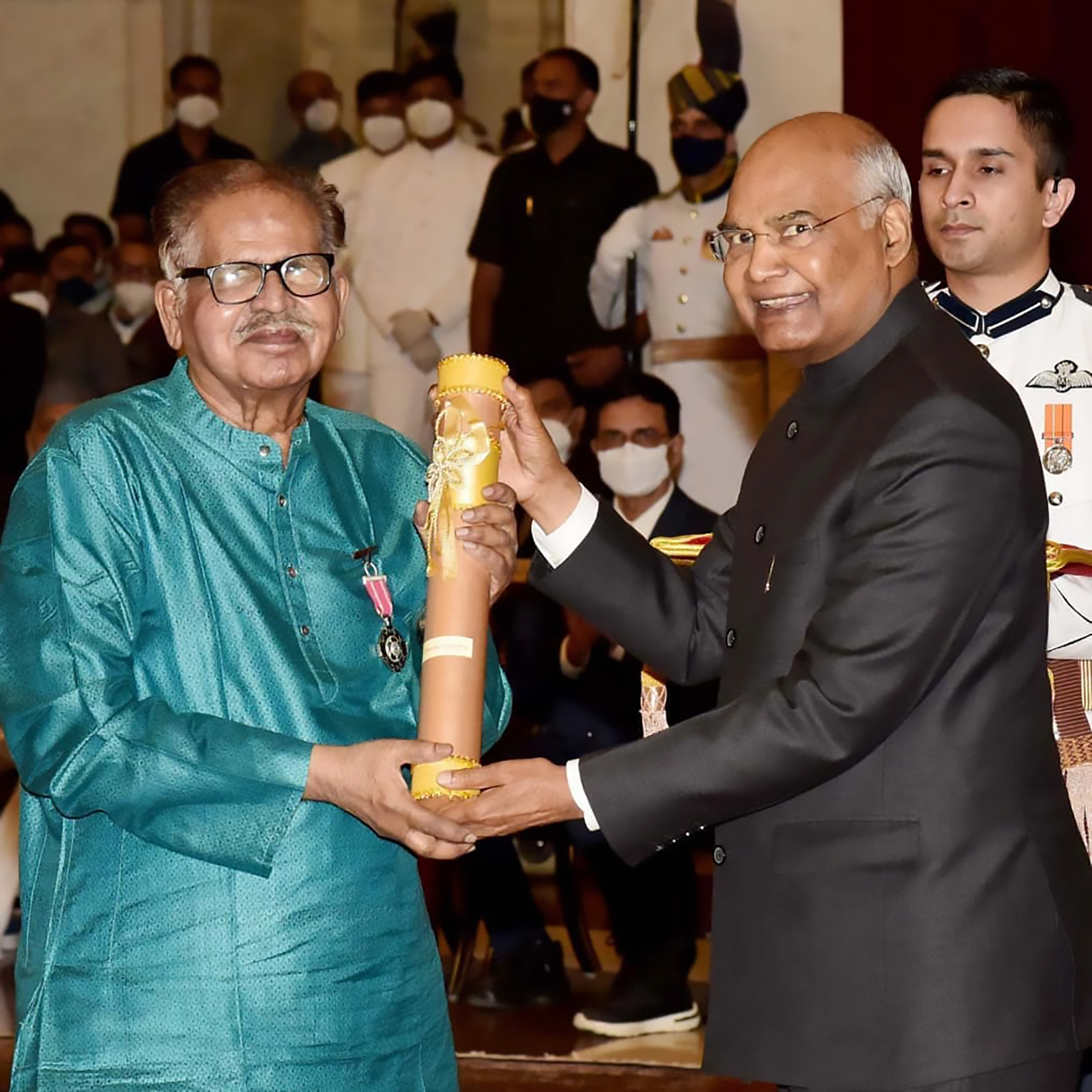
Manohar Devadoss receives Padma Shri award for his life time achievement from The President of India, in 2021

== Awards ==
- Padma Shri in 2020
