= Lohitpur =

Village in Arunachal Pradesh, India

- Village
- Map of Arunachal Pradesh Lohitpur (India)
- Coordinates: 28.00446°N 96.20793°E
- Country: India
- State: Arunachal Pradesh
- District: Lohit
- District: Lohit

Area
  - Total: 1,440 ha (3,600 acres)
- Elevation: 503 m (1,650 ft)

Population (2011)
  - Total: 1,514
  - Density: 105/km^{2} (272/sq mi)

Languages
  - Official: English
- Time zone: UTC+5:30 (IST)
- Postal code: 792001
- STD Code: 03804
- Vehicle registration: AR-11

Lohitpur is a village in Lohit district, Arunachal Pradesh, India. As per 2011 Census of India, Lohitpur has a population of 1,514 people including 1,029 males and 485 females, with a literacy rate of 89.54%.

Lohitpur village is a high-altitude area. Some scenes of Hindi movie Koyla were shot in Lohitpur.
