= Geevarghese Dioscoros =

Thevarvelil Geevarghese Mar Dioscoros (1926–1999) was the Metropolitan of the Thiruvananthapuram Diocese of the Malankara Orthodox Syrian Church.

== Life ==
Geevarghese Mar Dioscoros was born on 12 October 1926, the youngest son of Kunjupappi and Achamma of the Thevervelil Family in Kozhencherry. After completing Intermediate at Madurai American College in 1948, he joined the Madras Christian College. He graduated from there in 1950 and took his master's degree in sociology from the Bombay School of Economics. He worked as the Secretary of the Co-operative Bank in Kozhenchery. While undergoing the officer's training course at the Reserve Bank of India he resigned and joined the Orthodox Theological Seminary at Kottayam for studies in divinity.

He was ordained as a deacon in April 1963, and as a priest in 1964 by Geevarghese Catholicose II. In 1966, he went for higher studies in theology at Jerusalem. In 1970, he founded the Holy Trinity Ashram in Ranni and opted to reside there.

In 1973 he became the diocesan Secretary of Thumpamon. On 16 May 1977, the Malankara Association that met at Mavelikara elected him for the Episcopal order. He was consecrated as Episcopa Geevarghese Mar Dioscorus by Baselios Mar Thoma Mathews I, Catholicos of the East on 15 May 1978 at Pazhani Church. He became the first Episcopa of the newly formed Diocese of Thiruvananthapuram on 1 January 1979. On 28 February 1981, he was consecrated as a Metropolitan in the old Seminary Chapel. He founded the Ranny Holy Trinity Ashram, the Ulloor Orthodox Church Centre, the Edamulaikal V.M.D.M Centre, the Sreekariyam Handicapped Children's Welfare Centre, and the Thiruvananthapuram Holy Trinity School and Convent. He died on 23 July 1999 and was interred in Holy Trinity Ashram, Ranny.
