= Huser =

Defunct Japanese real estate agency

Huser (ヒューザー, Human User Company) was a Japanese real estate agency (a developer) based in Ōta, Tokyo which developed and sold condominiums. Its founder and chairman was Susumu Ojima. Its capital was two hundred eight million yen (2005) and its sales were twelve billion four hundred million yen as of March 2004.

== Company history ==
- 1982 – It was established (恒和不動産株式会社, Kōwa Real Estate Co., Ltd)
- 1983 – It was renamed Apartment Distribution Center Co., Ltd. (株式会社マンション流通センター)
- 1985 – It was renamed Housing Center Co., Ltd. (株式会社ハウジングセンター)
- 2003 – It was renamed Huser Co., Ltd. (株式会社ヒューザー) The company name "Huser" is an abbreviation of "HUman USer".
- 2005 – The falsification of structural earthquake resistance data by Huser was discovered in some of the condominiums it sold. The purchase of Seishin Oriental Hotel from Daiei by Huser was decided just before this, but it was canceled. Huser was forced into a suspension of business.
- January 31, 2006 – The main office was evacuated from the top floor of Pacific Century Place in Marunouchi, Chiyoda. The next day, it moved the main office to Ota, Tokyo.
- February 16, 2006 – Declared bankruptcy by the Tokyo District Court.
