= Susumu Ojima =

Japanese entrepreneur (born 1953)

Susumu Ojima (小嶋 進, Ojima Susumu; born June 4, 1953) is a Japanese entrepreneur who was a founder and chairman of Huser Co., Ltd.

== Biography ==
In 1953, he was born in Shikama, Kami District, Miyagi Prefecture. In 2005, he became the focus of attention in a scandal involving architectural forgery. On May 17, 2006, he was arrested for false pretenses along with Kimura Construction's president Moriyoshi Kimura.

== See also ==
- Huser
- Hidetsugu Aneha
- Togo Fujita
- Moriyoshi Kimura
- Akira Shinozuka
- Takeshi Uchikawa
