= Abiramam =

- Panchayat town
- Location within Tamil Nadu Location within India
- Coordinates: 9.4423°N 78.4415°E
- Country: India
- State: Tamil Nadu
- District: Ramanathapuram
- Elevation: 64.71 m (212.3 ft)

Population (2001)
  - Total: 6,636

Abiramam is a panchayat town in Ramanathapuram district in the Indian state of Tamil Nadu.

== Geography ==
Abiramam is located at 9.47°N 78.45°E. It has an average elevation of 41 metres (135 ft).

== Demographics ==
As of the 2001 India census, Abiramam had a population of 6636. Males constitute 49% of the population and females 51%. Abiramam has an average literacy rate of 78%, higher than the national average of 59.5%; with 53% of the males and 47% of females literate. 10% of the population is under six years of age.

== Schools ==
Abiramam has some of the oldest schools in the district - Muslim Higher Secondary School (more than 75 years old) and S.N. Ismail Middle School.
