= Jacob Sahaya Kumar Aruni =

Indian celebrity chef (1974–2012)

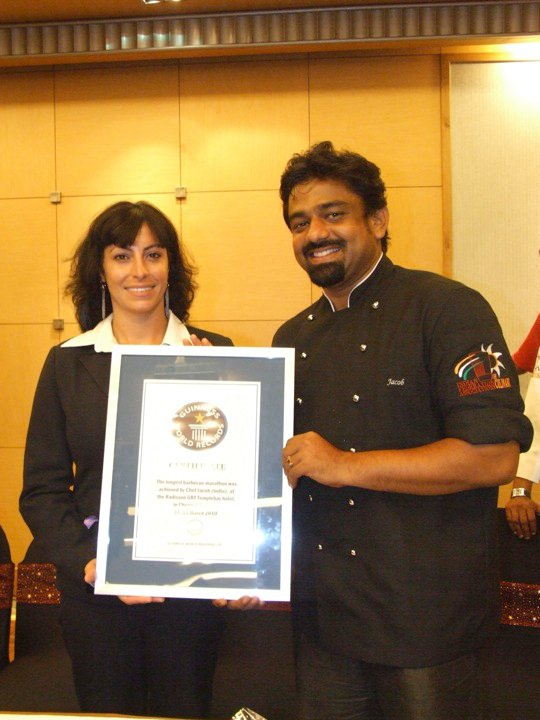
- Aruni receiving the Guinness World Record
- Born: 4 June 1974; Uthamapalayam, Tamil Nadu
- Died: 4 November 2012 (aged 38)

Jacob Sahaya Kumar Aruni (4 June 1974 – 4 November 2012), popularly known as "Chef Jacob", was an Indian celebrity chef born in Uthamapalayam, Tamil Nadu. He was known for his authentic South Indian cuisines. Aruni was a visiting chef at several hotels, and a consultant chef. He was also a food historian, spice collector and promoter of South Indian cooking.

== Career ==
Aruni worked in various catering schools as faculty and went on to take an advanced degree in catering technology. Later he became head of the Department of Catering at Cherraan's Arts Science College, Kangeyam and was subsequently its principal.

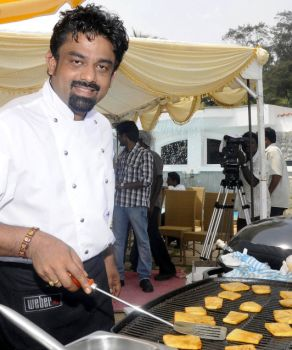

Aruni created a new Guinness World Record for the longest individual barbecue cooking marathon. He barbecued for 24 hours and five minutes, cooking a total of 485 dishes (including 150 non-vegetarian) at Radisson Temple Bay's in Chennai on 14–15 March 2010. Earlier records on barbecue were performed by some chefs, so he was the first to perform the individual barbecue event. The event was adjudicated by a committee of 3 main and 24 sub-judges chosen by the Guinness Book of World Records.

His other accolades include a felicitation from the former President Abdul Kalam for his extensive research on ancient cuisines of South India. He cooked Kongunadu food and served dignitaries at a week-long official dinner at Rashtrapathi Bhavan, the President's official residence in New Delhi. The Indian Federation of Culinary Associations (IFCA) also acknowledged his efforts, awarding him the Best Young Chef Instructor of the year 2005–2007.

He was known for wacky television stunts. He once cooked up a mutton curry on a coconut tree and in another instance whipped up a prawn dish in a boat in the middle of a river. His eponymous restaurant, "Jacob's kitchen" in Chennai, focused mainly on traditional South Indian flavors and veered away from the mundane Chettinad fare commonly found in restaurants. The restaurant opened to much critical and commercial success.

He was also popular for his TV show Aaha Enna Rusi, aired on Saturdays on Sun TV, a Tamil satellite channel every Saturday. He was an expert in authentic South Indian cuisine.

== Personal life ==
Jacob Aruni died from a heart attack on 4 November 2012 at the Apollo First Med Hospital in Chennai. He was 38 years old.
