= New Mexico Symphony Orchestra =

The New Mexico Symphony Orchestra (NMSO) was a symphony orchestra in Albuquerque, New Mexico. It operated from 1932 until 2011, when it declared bankruptcy.

== History ==
The orchestra, originally called the Albuquerque Civic Symphony, was organized by local members of the Rotary Club and first performed on November 30, 1932, at Carlisle Gymnasium. The founding conductor was Grace Thompson Edmister, who was one of the first women to lead a classical orchestra in the United States. Edminster was succeeded in 1941 by William Kunkel, who was in turn replaced in 1945 by Kurt Frederick. Frederick managed to convince the world-renowned Austrian-American composer Arnold Schoenberg to commission the premiere of his work „A Survivor from Warsaw“ to the ACS. The work was written in remembrance of the Warsaw Ghetto Uprising in Poland during World War II, and is one of the most important classical works to commemorate the Shoah, the genocide of more than six million European Jews by Nazi Germany. Frederick, who continued teaching at the University of New Mexico and later founded the Albuquerque Youth Symphony, was replaced in 1950 by Hans Lange. The German-American conductor Lange was born in Constantinople, Turkey, where his father Paul Lange had been director of the sultan's music. Hans Lange himself had been assistant of Arturo Toscanini and conductor of Chicago Symphony Orchestra, before assuming the position at the ACS. Under the direction of Lange the ACS was transformed from a "college" amateur ensemble into what was known as one of the premier professional orchestras in the United States. From 2000, Guillermo Figueroa was the director of NMSO.

The New Mexico Symphony Orchestra (NMSO) entered Chapter 7 bankruptcy on April 20, 2011, announcing that it would cease operations and existence. Orchestra members were notified of the board's decision to file for bankruptcy by email, a few hours after the vote was taken. But, according to KRQE, many of the orchestra's 78 members heard about the bankruptcy filing from media reports. The New Mexico Philharmonic was announced as a new organization on May 11, 2011, and later kicked off the 2011–2012 inaugural season, with the opening concert on December 10, 2011.

== Music directors ==
- Grace Thompson Edmister (1932–1941)
- William Kunkel (1941–1945)
- Kurt Frederick (1945–1950)
- Hans Lange (1950–1958)
- Maurice Bonney (1958–1968)
- Yoshimi Takeda (1970–1984)
- Neal Stulberg (1985–1993)
- David Lockington (1995–2000)
- Guillermo Figueroa (2000–2011)
