= Kurt Frederick =

Kurt Frederick may refer to:

- Kurt Frederick (footballer)
- Kurt Frederick (musician)
