= Hans Lange (conductor) =

- Born: February 17, 1884; Istanbul, Ottoman Empire
- Died: August 13, 1960 (aged 76); Albuquerque, New Mexico, United States
- Occupations: musician, violinist, conductor
- Known for: assistant of Arturo Toscanini at the New York Philharmonic Orchestra, conductor at Chicago Symphony Orchestra, founder of New Mexico Symphony Orchestra
- Parent: Paul Lange

Hans Lange (February 17, 1884 in Istanbul – August 13, 1960 in Albuquerque, New Mexico) was a German-American conductor and musician. He was a son of Paul Lange, who had been a lecturer for music at the American College for Girls and German High School Istanbul in the 1890s, and later was appointed the Sultan's director of music. Hans Lange himself was an alumnus of German High School Istanbul.

Lange was educated in Prague and other European cities. After assignments in several German cities, one being in Bielefeld, he entered the United States in 1925 with a German orchestra to give concerts. The orchestra was dissolved during the tour, and Lange had to restart his career.

Lange joined the New York Philharmonic Orchestra as a violinist in 1927, but began soon to conduct as well. He became assistant to Arturo Toscanini, and rehearsed almost all his performances. At that time, he also worked on his own as a conductor: besides numerous assignments as conductor of the New York Philharmonic in concerts at Carnegie Hall until 1936, he recorded a concert of Wagner excerpts with the famous soprano Kirsten Flagstad for His Master's Voice.

In 1936–1946 he worked as Associate Conductor of the Chicago Symphony Orchestra. As he had not taken up US citizenship during the war, his contract with CSO was not extended after 1946. On May 12, 1940, he recorded Beethoven's Piano Concerto No. 5 ("Emperor") with the CSO and the Polish American piano virtuoso Jozef Hofmann. The recording (35 minutes) has been published in CSO's own historic series and in Jozef Hofmann anthologies. In the same year Lange conducted the CSO during its legendary concert with U.S. piano legend Liberace at the Pabst Theater in Milwaukee.

In 1946-1949 Lange worked in Toledo, Ohio, with the local Friends of Music Orchestra (later Toledo Symphony Orchestra). On April 13, 1947, he was invited again by his former boss Toscanini to New York to perform as guest conductor at the NBC Symphony Orchestra.

In 1950, Lange started to work with the Albuquerque Civic Symphony, less than two years after his predecessor Kurt Frederick had managed to bring the world premiere of Schoenberg's "A Survivor from Warsaw" to Albuquerque in November 1948. Lange transformed the ACS from an amateur ensemble into the New Mexico Symphony Orchestra (NMSO), which was one of the leading professional orchestras in the United States until it went bankrupt in 2011. He died on August 13, 1960 in New Mexico.

He was a National Patron of Delta Omicron, an international professional music fraternity.

During his tenure in Chicago, Lange was one of the teachers and mentors of composer Leon Stein.
