= Zhvanets =

Rural locality in Khmelnytskyi Oblast, Ukraine

Zhvanets Жванець
- Village
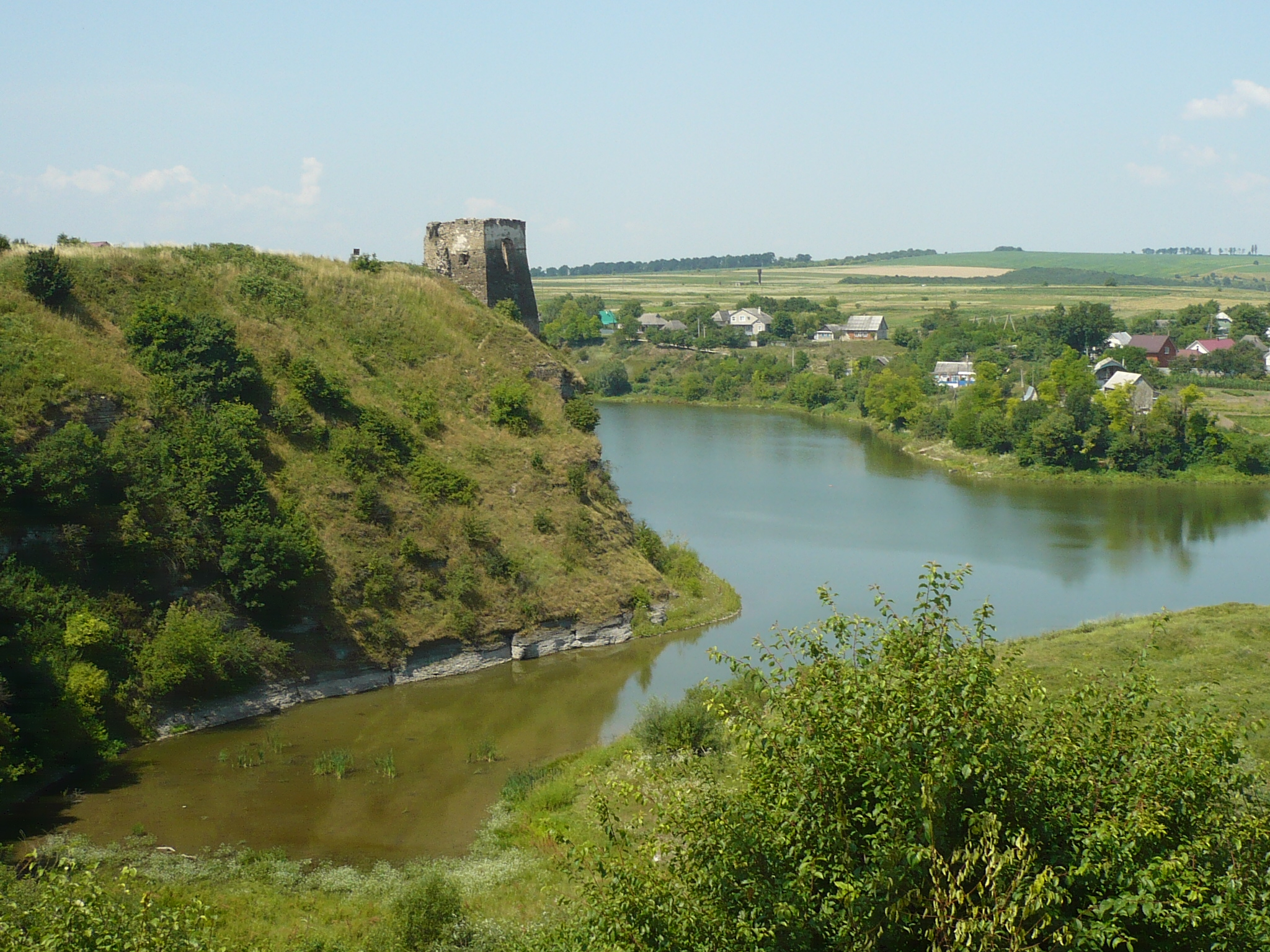
- Zhvanets Castle

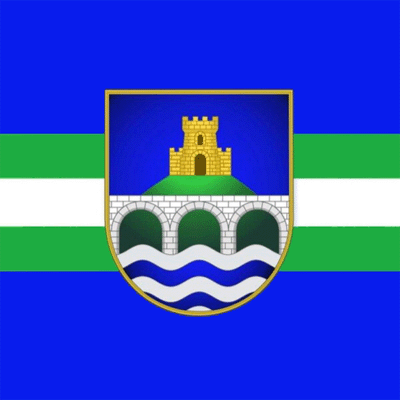
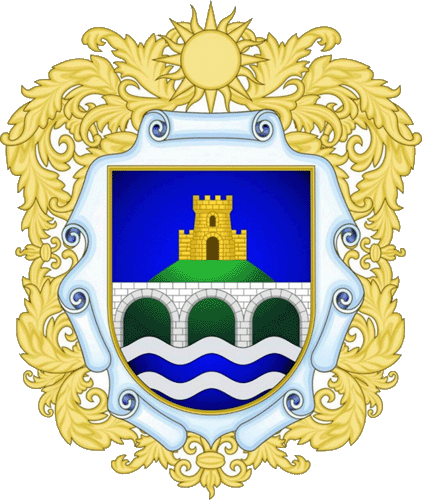
- Flag Coat of arms

- Location within Khmelnytskyi Oblast Location within Ukraine
- Coordinates: 48°33′00″N 26°29′15″E
- Country: Ukraine
- Oblast: Khmelnytskyi Oblast
- Raion: Kamianets-Podilskyi Raion
- Hromada: Zhvanets rural hromada
- Established: 15th century
- First mentioned: 1431

Area
  - Total: 2.995 km^{2} (1.156 sq mi)

Population (2001)
  - Total: 1,529
  - Density: 510.5/km^{2} (1,322/sq mi)
- Time zone: UTC+2 (EET)
  - Summer (DST): UTC+3 (EEST)
- Postal code: 32365
- Area code: +380 3849

Zhvanets (Ukrainian: Жванець) is a village (a selo) in Kamianets-Podilskyi Raion (district) of Khmelnytskyi Oblast in western Ukraine. It hosts the administration of Zhvanets rural hromada, one of the hromadas of Ukraine. The village's population was 1,529 as of the 2001 Ukrainian census. Formerly a town, Zhvanets is known for its historical castle and remains of fortifications.

== Geography ==
The village lies at the confluence of Zhvanchyk river with the Dniester.

== History ==
Żwaniec, as it was known in Polish, was first mentioned in 1431, when the knight Svychko (or Svichka) received this settlement from Polish King Władysław II Jagiełło. It was established in an unpopulated area in the 15th century. Later on, it passed to the Jazłowiecki, Sroczycki, Koniecpolski and Lanckoroński noble families. Administratively it was located in the Podolian Voivodeship in the Lesser Poland Province of the Kingdom of Poland. In the 15th century, the Zhvanets Castle was built. Repeatedly rebuilt in the 16th and 17th centuries and significantly destroyed during the 20th century, the fortification was designed to serve as a counterpart to the Ottoman Khotyn Fortress located on the opposite bank of the DNiester.

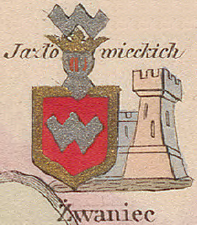
Zhvanets on the map

In 1620, the Turks and Tatars invaded Podolia having destroyed the fortress. The following year, 40,000 troops led by a Ukrainian Hetman of Zaporozhian Cossacks Petro Konashevych-Sahaidachny joined Zhvanets and took part in the Khotyn War. In 1646, King Władysław IV Vasa granted Żwaniec Magdeburg rights. It was a private town. As a result of its border location, Zhvanets suffered during numerous battles fought over the area, but at the same time became an important point of international trade, which contributed to the establishment of a community of Armenian merchants in the town.

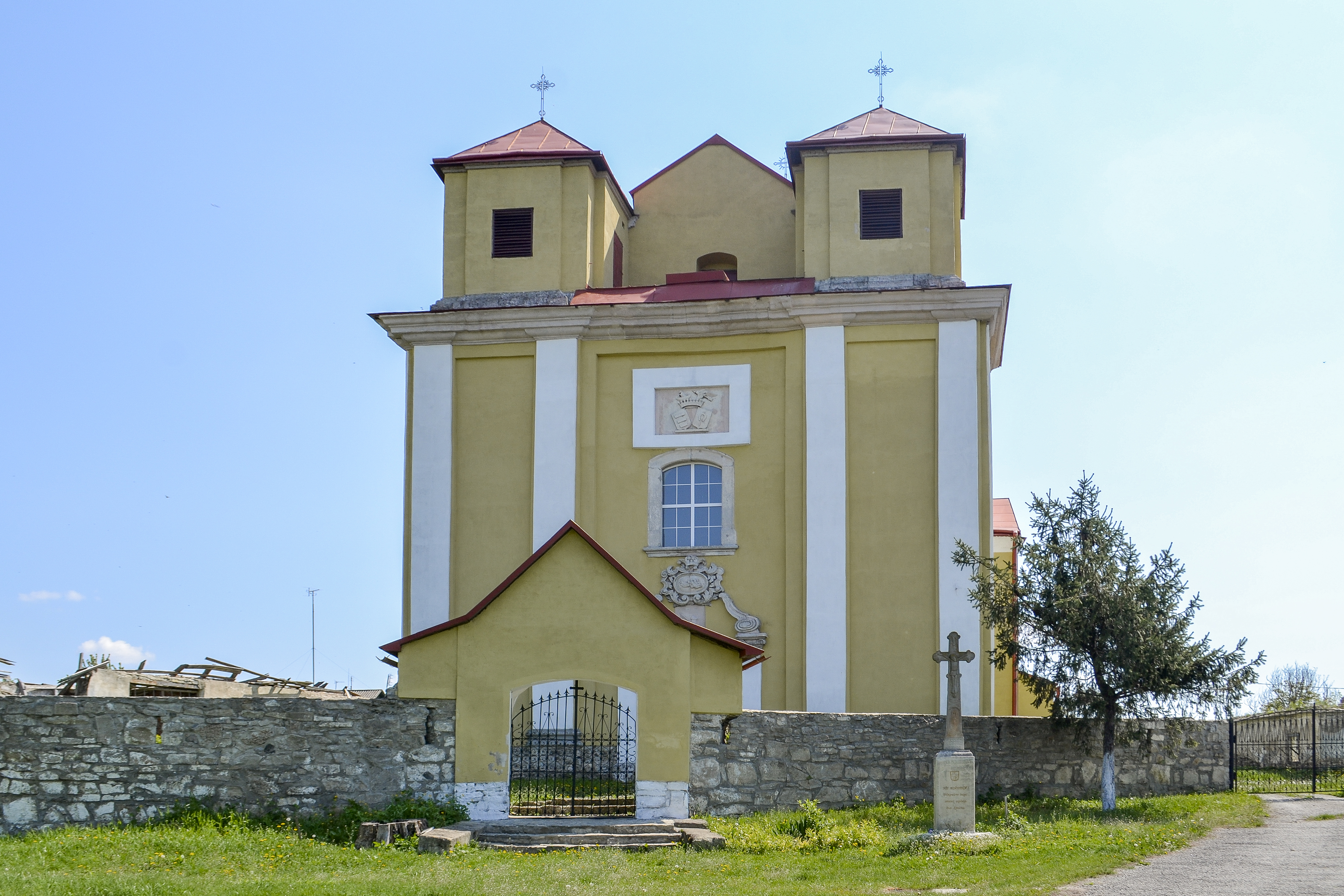
Old Armenian church

In the autumn of 1653, the troops of John II Casimir Vasa and Bohdan Khmelnytsky met near the city during Khmelnytsky Uprising resulting in the Siege of Zhvanets. As a result, a peace treaty was signed between the two sides. In 1672, Ottoman Sultan Mehmed IV invaded and seized the town. The castle was converted into a prison for captive Poles, including merchants from Kamieniec Podolski, thus, during the Battle of Chocim of 1673, it was destroyed by the order of John III Sobieski. During the Polish–Ottoman War of 1683–1699, John III Sobieski returned to Żwaniec in 1684, and the armies of Great Crown Hetman Stanisław Jan Jabłonowski and Lithuanian Great Hetman Kazimierz Jan Sapieha joined forces there. After the Polish victory in the war, the return of Żwaniec to Poland was confirmed in 1699.

After the war, the devastated border town was re-settled by newcomers from Przemyśl and Sanok, Armenians from Kamieniec Podolski and Greeks from Chocim, with the latter two groups specializing in trade. In 1768-1769 Zhvanets was the site of a battle between Bar Confederation and Russian troops. The town was visited by King Stanisław August Poniatowski in 1781.

Starting from the late 18th century, Zhvanets suffered a period of decline. The town was annexed by Russia in the Second Partition of Poland in 1793. A customs chamber was established in the town, which was abolished in 1812. The town was visited by Emperors Alexander I of Russia and Nicholas I of Russia in 1818 and 1843, respectively.

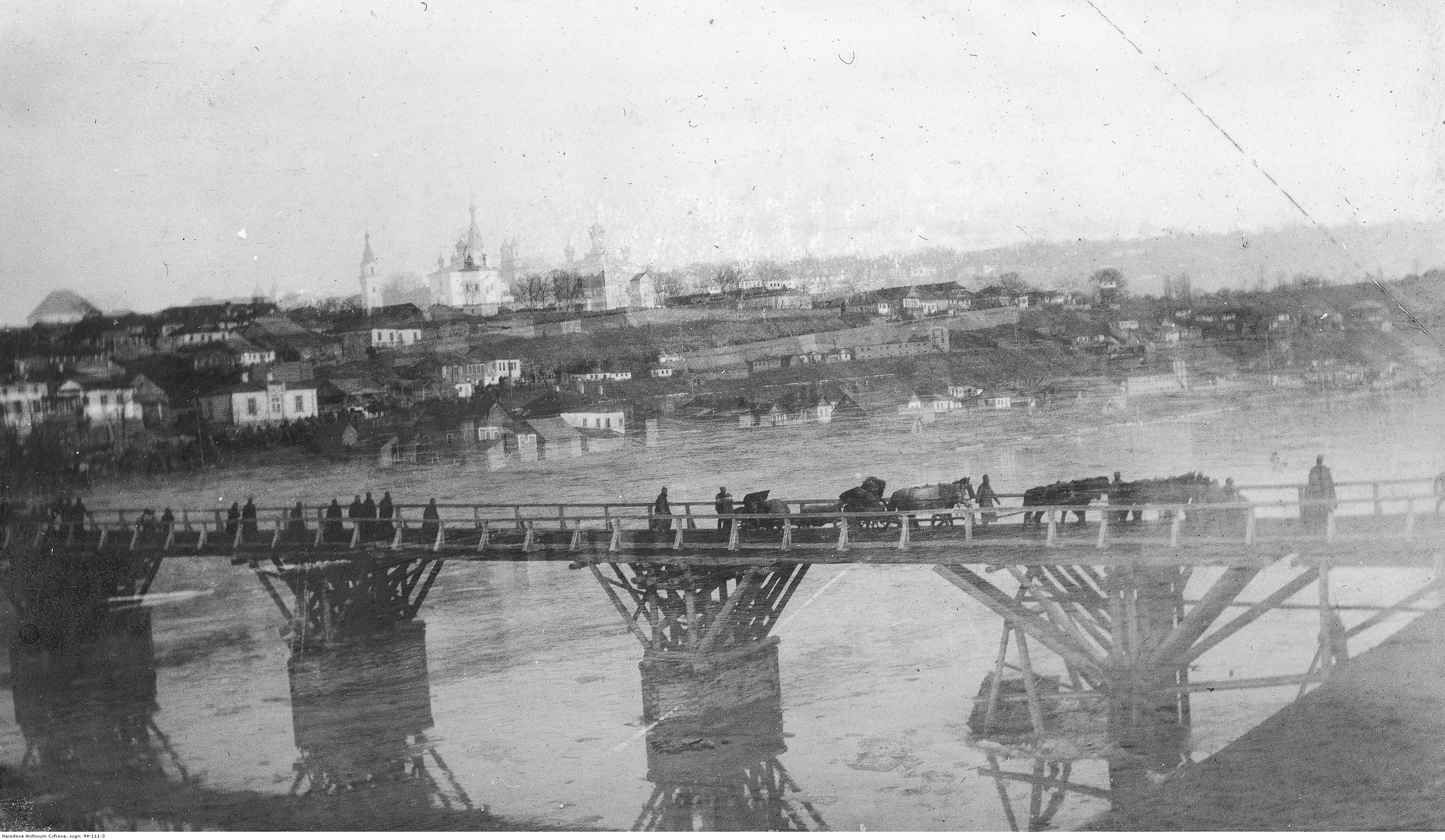
Zhvanets and wooden bridge, 1915

In early August 1914, the town was occupied by Austro-Hungarian troops, but then again occupied by Russian army. In February 1918, it was again captured by Austro-Hungarian troops. At the end of 1918, the town was captured by the troops of the Directory. In 1920, the town was administratively part of the Podolian District of Poland, before it passed to Soviet Ukraine. Afterwards it was located near Ukraine's tripoint with Poland and Romania.

During World War II, it was occupied by Nazi Germany from 1941 to 1944.

August 24, 1991, the village Zhvanets became part of the independent country of Ukraine.

Since September 8, 2017, through the merger of village councils, Zhvanets has become the center of the community of the same name.

== Notable people ==
- Corinne Chochem (1905-1990), Jewish American choreographer, born in Zhvanets
- Dov Karmi (1905–1962), architect in British Mandate Palestine and Israel, born in Zhvanets
- Jacob "the Sharp" Halpern (1698-1738), rabbi of Zhvanets and author of many unprinted books. Despite scholastic fame and an 1893 public appeal, his manuscripts (including Beit Yaakov and Megillat Yuhasin) languished in the Odessa home of Joseph Israel Halpern (1840-1928) and have since been lost. Formerly rabbi of Pomoriany, whence he composed a responsum in 1721. His father Tobiah Jehiel Michel Halpern had been rabbi of Belz. His wife was Fradl and his sons included Zeev Halpern and Solomon Isaac Halpern, rabbi of Ternopil.

== Gallery ==
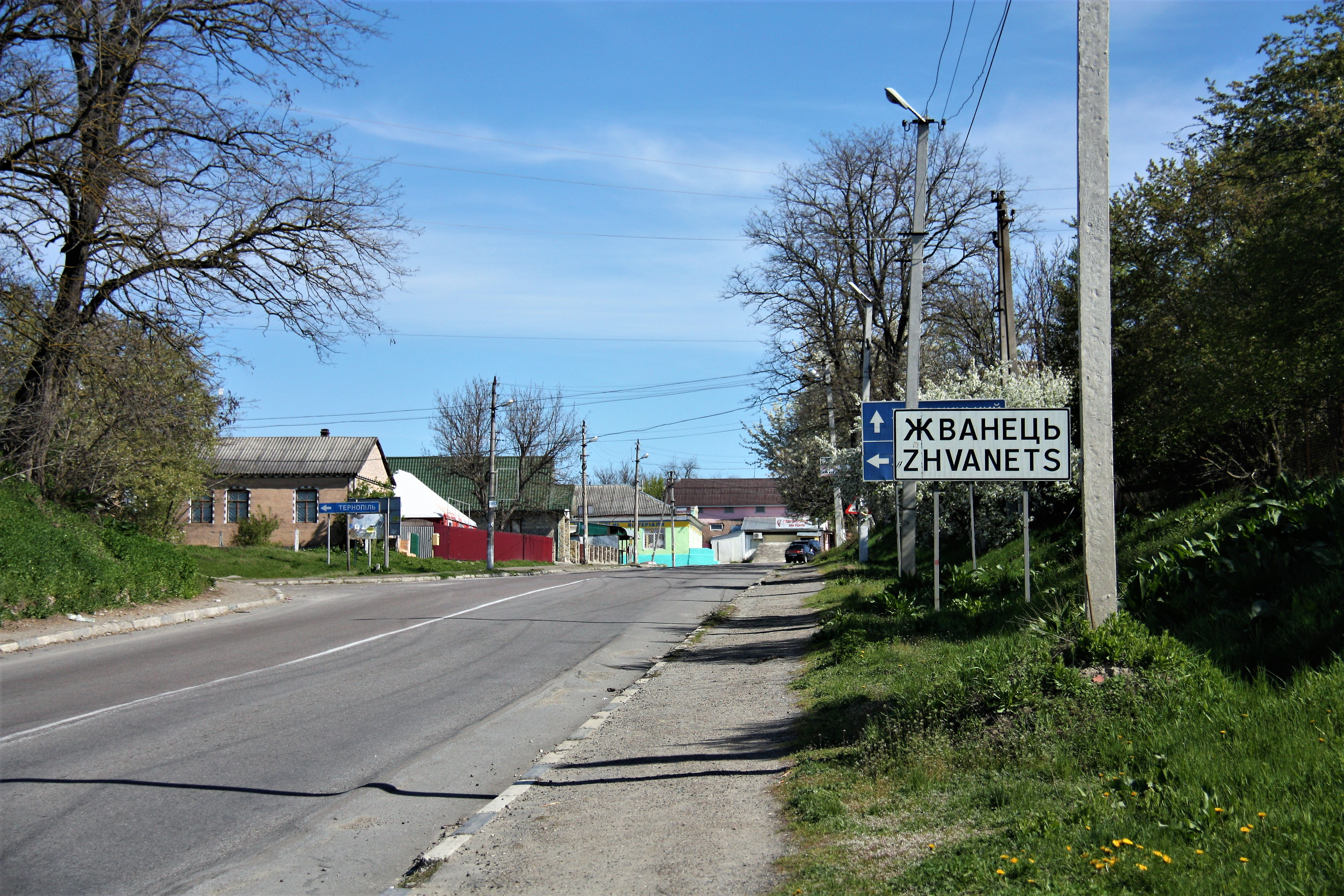
Entrance to the village

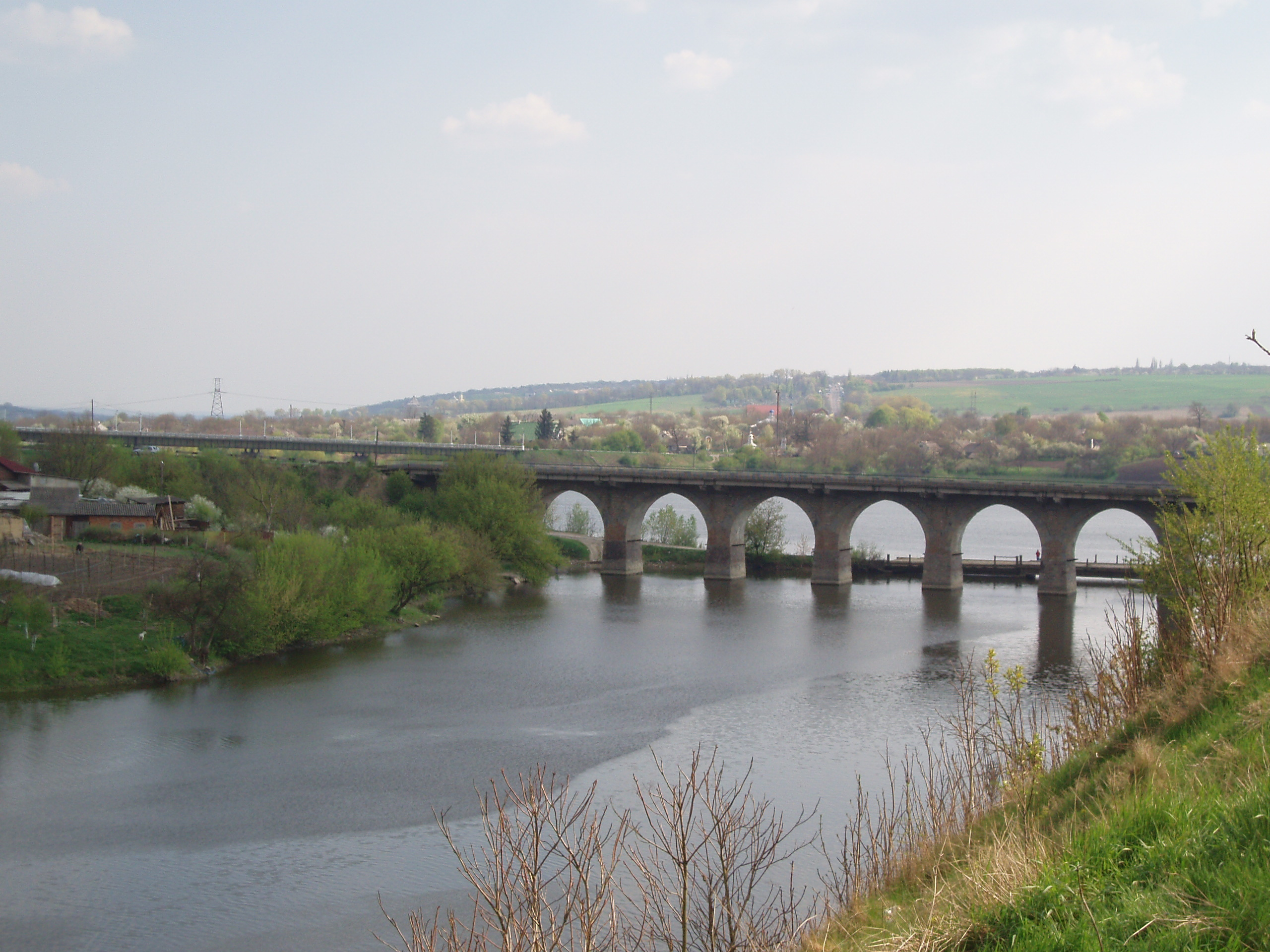
Bridge over Zhvanchyk

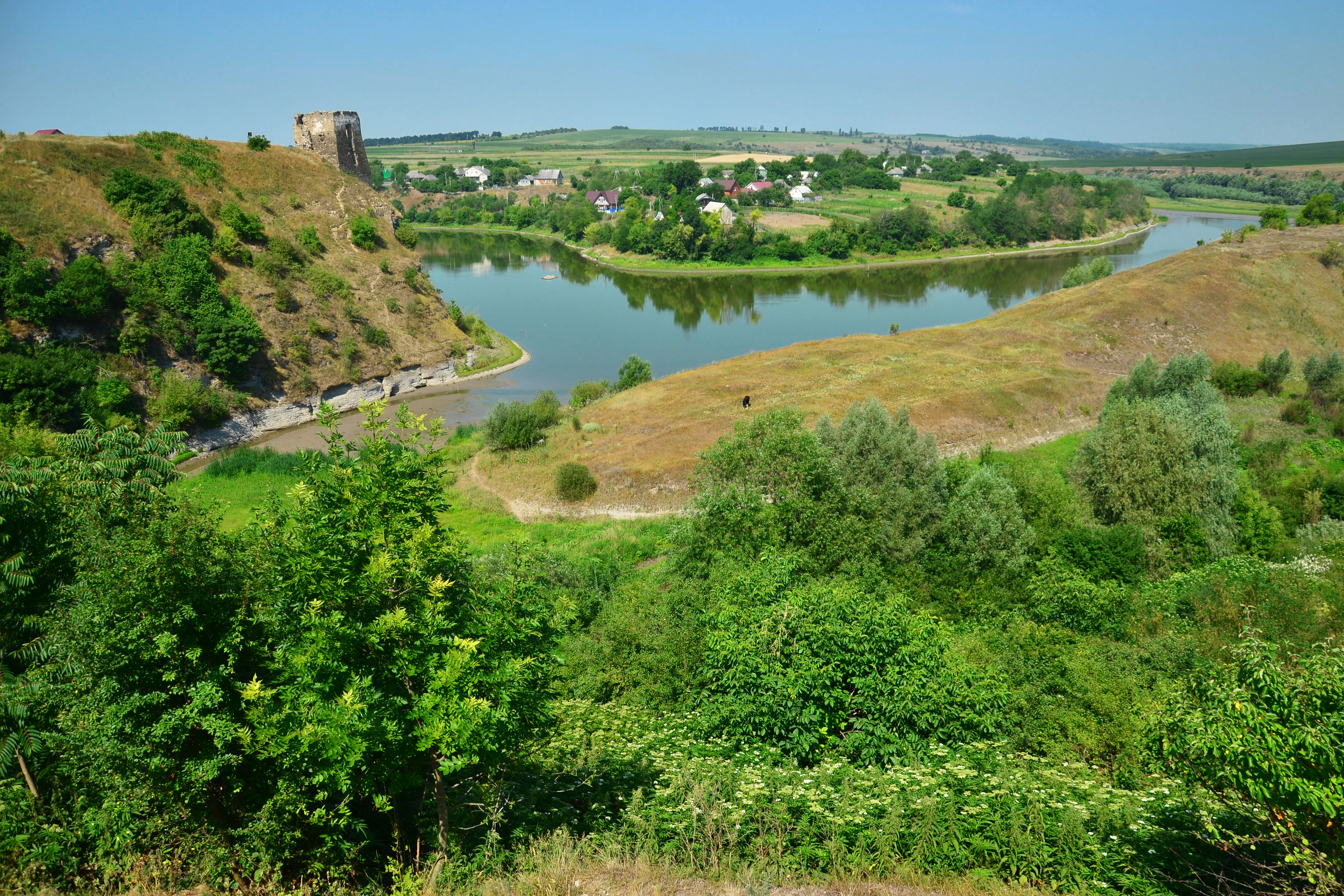
On the banks of the river

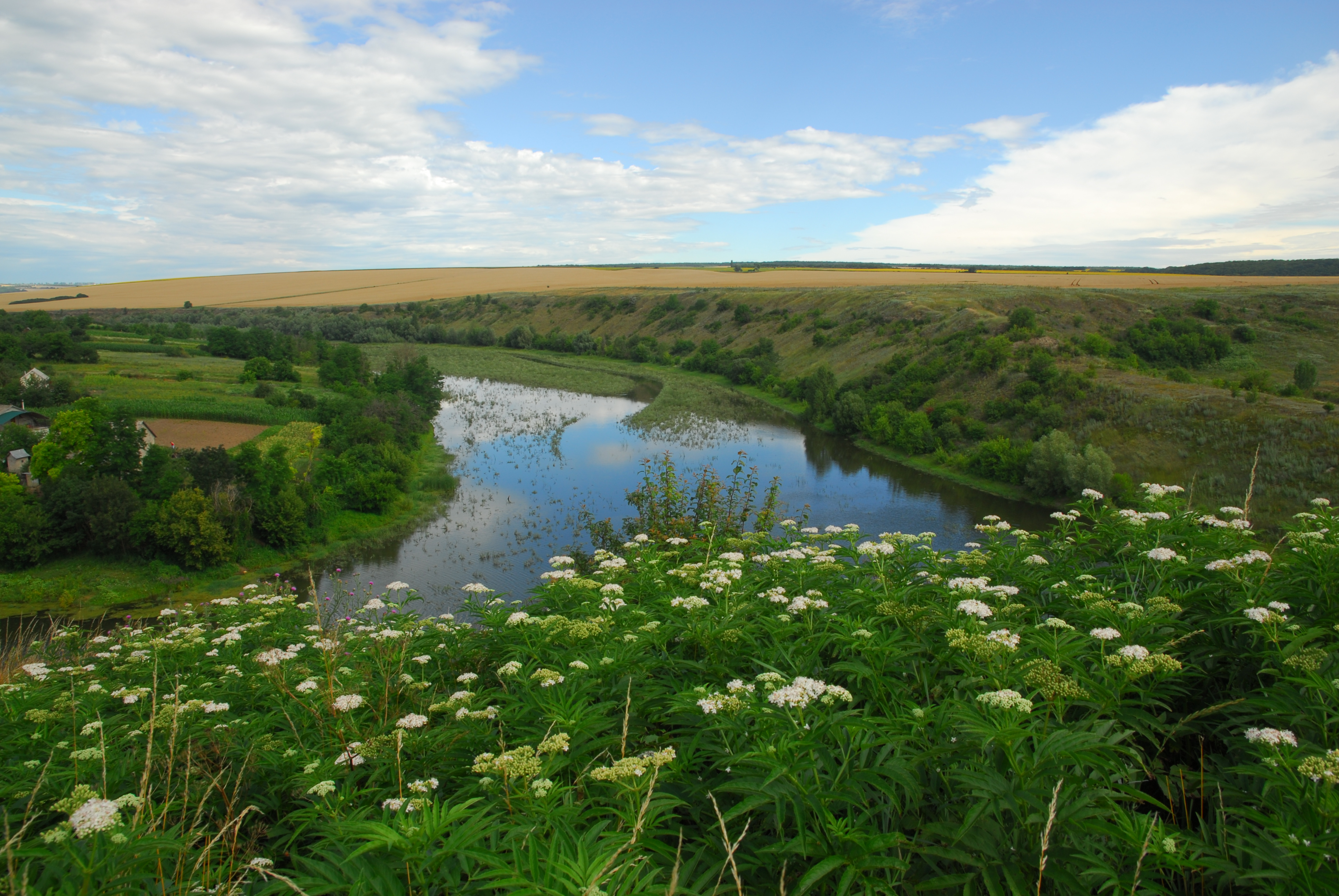
Near the castle

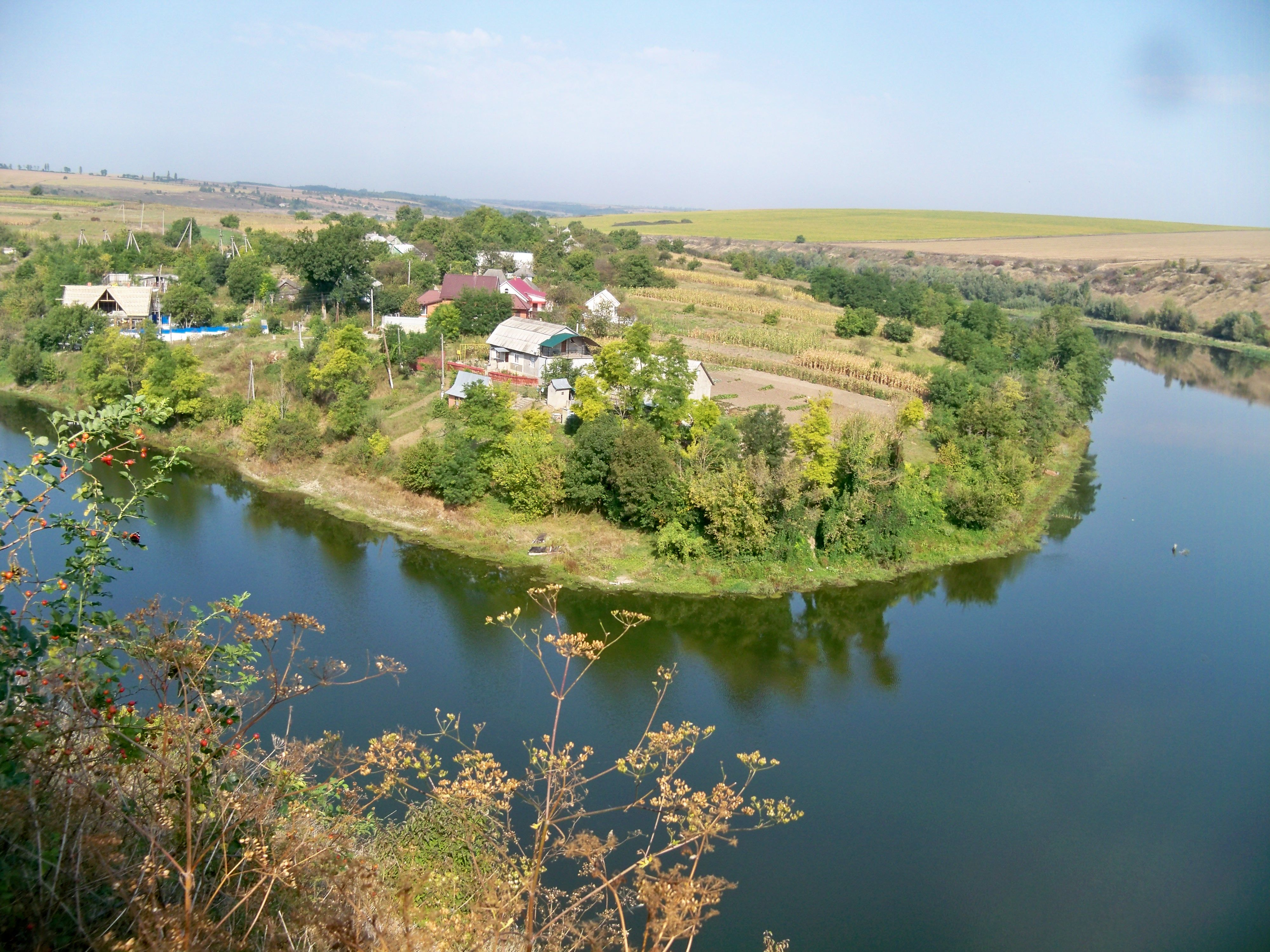
Zhvanets

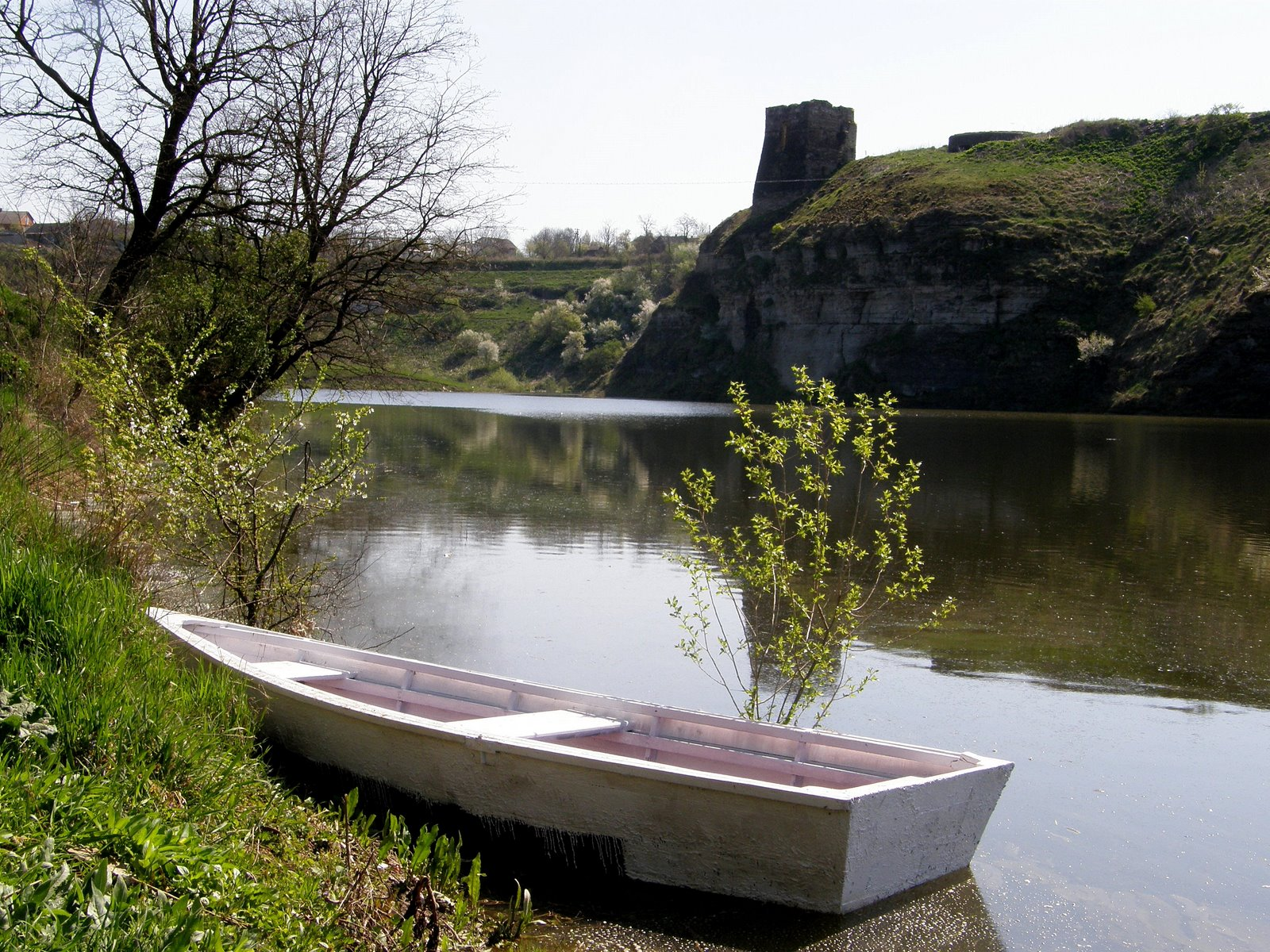
Castle

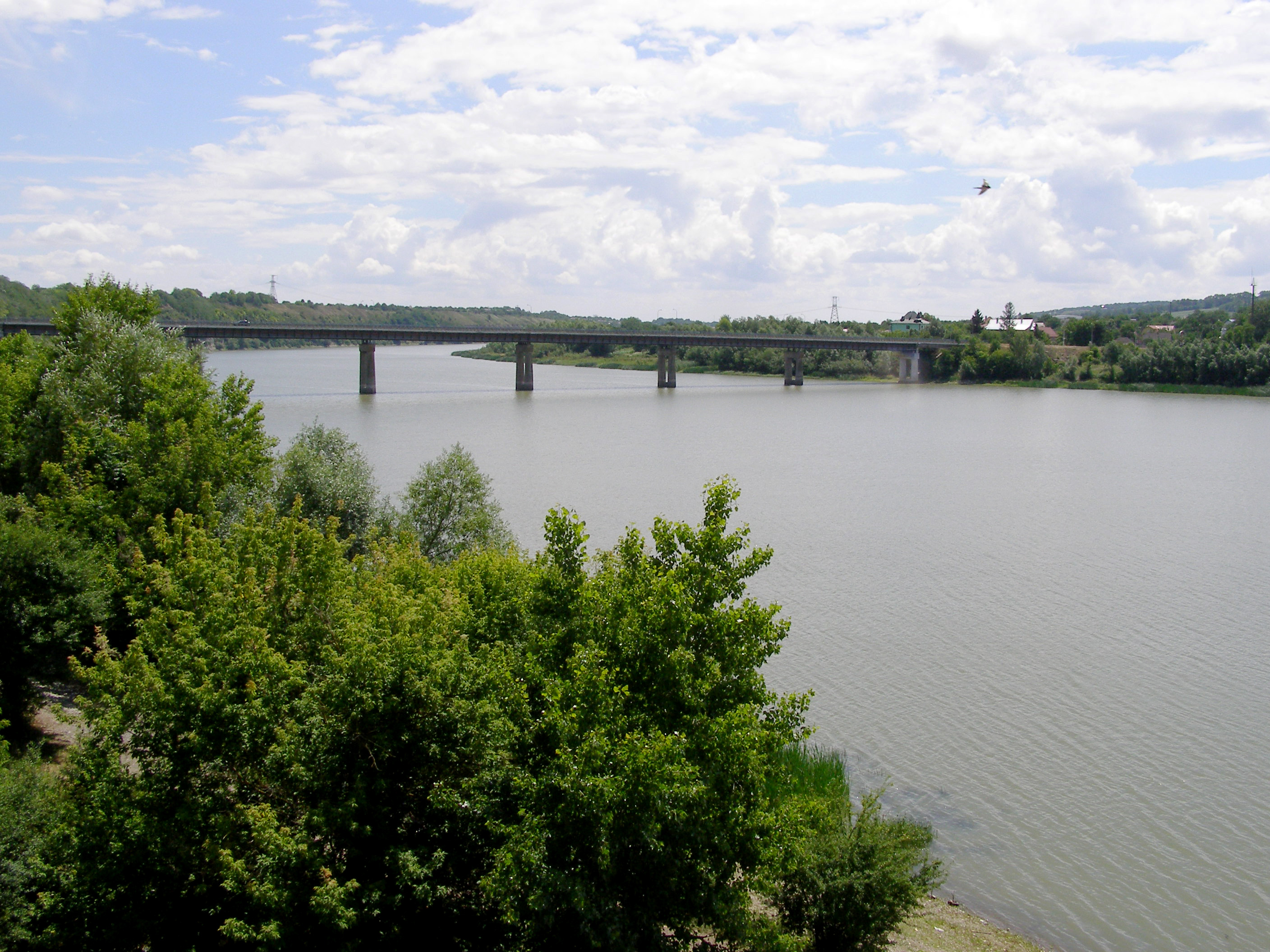
Bridge over the Dniester

== See also ==
- Siege of Zhvanets

== Bibliography ==
- Rolle, Antoni Józef (1880). Zameczki podolskie na Kresach Multańskich (in Polish). Vol. III. Warszawa.
