= Corinne Chochem =

Jewish American choreographer and painter

Corinne Chochem (Hebrew: קורין חכם; December 16, 1907 – September 18, 1990) was an American choreographer and dance teacher of Russian Jewish descent. In her late life she became a painter. She is recognized for her impact on Hebrew folk dance. She published two books on Jewish dances and recorded several albums of music for Israeli folk dances accompanied with dance notations.

She is credited with the idea for A Survivor from Warsaw.

Corinne Chochem was born in Zwanitz (the Yiddish name for Zhvanets), Russian Empire to Esther (née Gendelman) and Mendel Chochem. In 1920 the family emigrated to the United States.

In 1950, while studying in Israel, she met Yehoshua Kovarsky (1907-1967), a painter, and married him. At that time she started studying painting. In her later life, after her husband died, she herself became a painter and had several exhibitions under husband's surname Kovarska.

== Books ==
- 1941: (with Muriel Roth) Palestine dances! (Palestine dances! in libraries (WorldCat catalog))
  The book contains detailed instructions, musical scores, and lyrics for 17 folk dances.
- 1948: Jewish holiday dances (Jewish holiday dances' in libraries (WorldCat catalog))
