= Siege of Zhvanets =

1653 battle

- Part of the Khmelnytskyi Uprising
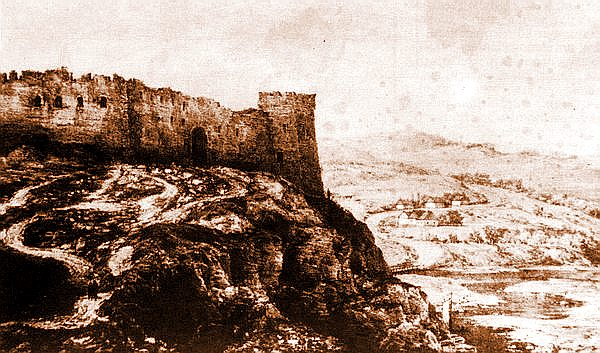
- Painting of the Zhvanets Fortress by Napoleon Orda in 1876
Date	September – 16 December 1653
Location	Zhvanets, Podolian Voivodeship, Polish–Lithuanian Commonwealth
Result	See § Aftermath

Belligerents
Cossack Hetmanate; Crimean Khanate	Polish–Lithuanian Commonwealth

Commanders and leaders
Bohdan Khmelnytskyi; Ivan Bohun; Ivan Sirko; İslâm III Giray	John II Casimir

Strength
30,000–40,000 Cossacks; 20,000 Tatars	30,000–40,000 cavalry, infantry and servants 20,000 Schwarze Reiters; 2,000 Transylvanian mercenaries 1,000 Moldavian mercenaries Several thousand of the Pospolite Ruszenie

Casualties and losses
Unknown	25,000 killed and wounded (Note: Majority died due to the strong Cossack–Tatar attacks, starvation and diseases during the siege. Of which were 10,000 Polish–Lithuanian and 15,000 Schwarze Reiters forces)

The siege of Zhvanets (Ukrainian: Облога Жванця, Polish: Oblężenie Żwańca; September – 15 December 1653) was fought between the Cossack Hetmanate, Crimean Khanate and the Polish–Lithuanian Commonwealth as a part of the Khmelnytskyi Uprising. Near the site of the present-day village of Zhvanets on the Dniester River in Ukraine, forces of Zaporozhian Cossacks and Crimean Tatars under the command of Bohdan Khmelnytskyi, Ivan Bohun and İslâm III Giray besieged a Polish–Lithuanian force under the command of John II Casimir.

== Background ==
Despite poor quality of Polish soldiers and their officers, as cream of the Polish Army had been murdered in the Batih massacre (June 1652), the spring offensive of 1653 progressed successfully. The situation changed when Khmelnytsky’s Cossacks joined forces with Tatars commanded personally by Islam III Giray. When news of this reached King Jan Kazimierz Waza, he decided to abandon his positions in Bar, Ukraine, and head towards Zhvanets, to await Moldavian and Transilvanian reinforcements.

Polish forces camped at the confluence of the Zhvanchyk and the Dniestr rivers, building a pontoon bridge over the Dniester, to keep in touch with Bucovina. The reinforcements were inadequate: George II Rakoczi sent 2000 soldiers, while Gheorghe Stefan, only 1000.

== Siege ==
Bohdan Khmelnytsky decided not to make a frontal attack of the Polish camp. Instead, he chose a long-lasting siege, which began in late August 1653, and dragged on throughout autumn into December. As time went by and the weather worsened, Polish defenders began to starve, and a number of soldiers fled their positions in search of food. The situation was anxiously observed by Khan Islam III Giray, who did not wish for complete destruction of Polish forces, as this would eventually strengthen the Cossacks, who, despite the temporary alliance, were his traditional enemies. Furthermore, in late autumn news from Moscow came: the Russians wanted to protect Ukraine, and wage war against Poland.

Under the circumstances, on 16 December 1653, the Poles and Tatars agreed to an oral truce: the Treaty of Kamianets (1653). Khmelnytsky had to end the siege: his only achievement was that the Poles agreed to renew the Treaty of Zboriv. Polish Army finally left the camp, while Cossacks headed towards Pereyaslav, where the Treaty of Pereyaslav was signed in 1654.

== Aftermath ==
Some historians such as Humilev and Magocsi consider the battle an Cossack victory. However, others consider the battle inconclusive.

== Bibliography ==
- Władysław Andrzej Serczyk: Na płonącej Ukrainie. Dzieje Kozaczyzny 1648-1651. Warszawa: Książka i Wiedza, 1998, p. 328-329. ISBN 83-05-12969-1.
- Maciej Franz: Wojskowość Kozaczyzny Zaporoskiej w XVI-XVII wieku. Geneza i charakter. Toruń: Adam Marszałek, 2004, p. 222. ISBN 83-73-22803-9.
- Гумилев, Лев (2023). От Руси к России. Moscow: Москва. ISBN 978-5-17-153845-3.
