= Kurt Frederick (musician) =

Austrian-born musician

Kurt Frederick, born Kurt Fuchsgelb (4 March 1907 – 28 December 1997), was an Austrian-born musician who later became a conductor in New Mexico and a full-time professor of music at the University of New Mexico for 42 years.

== Biography ==
Kurt Frederick was born in Vienna, Austria to Ernestine (née Dohan) and Guido Fuchsgelb. His father worked for the Israelitische Kultusgemeinde Wien (IKG).

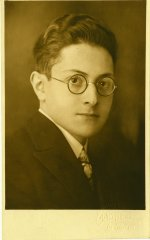

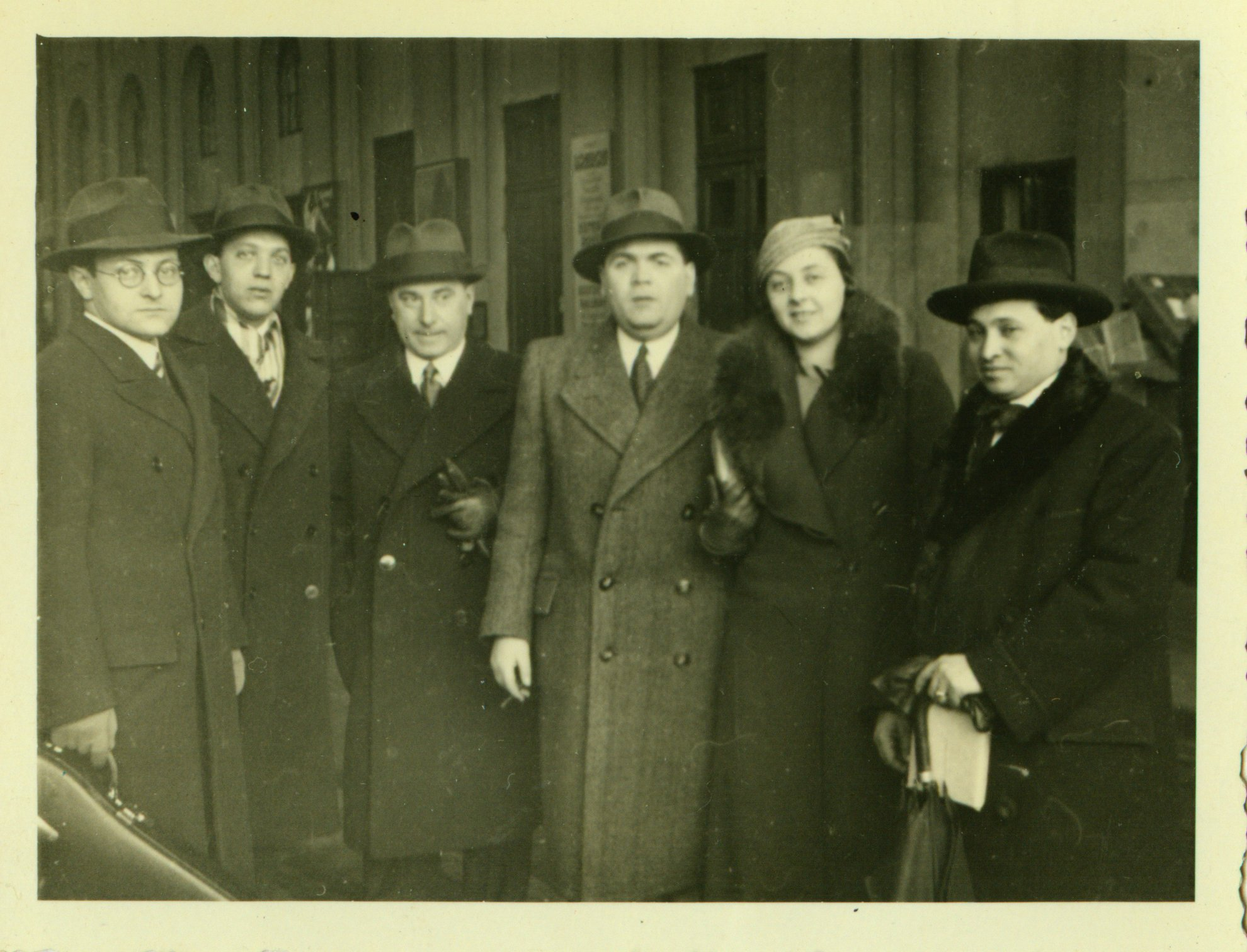

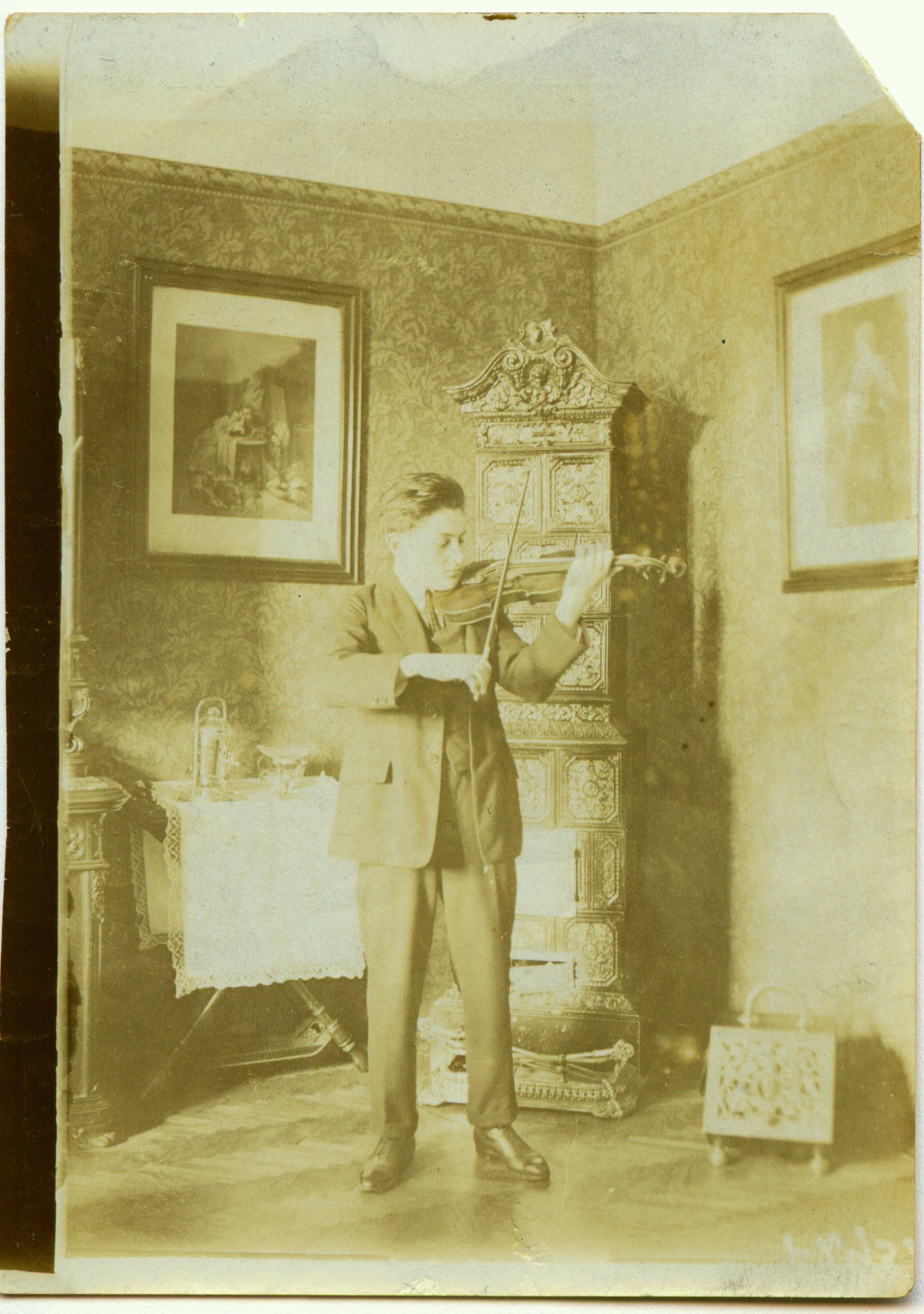

Frederick studied at the State Academy of Music in Vienna, now known as the University of Music and Performing Arts Vienna. He worked as the choir conductor at the Stadttempel, also known as the Seitenstettengasse Temple. Frederick fled Vienna after the Anschluss and moved to New York City through the rescue efforts of Gladys Kissel Miller Rokos and her daughter, Gladys Caroline Miller, whom he would marry in 1939. While in New York, Frederick worked as a violist first with the New Friends of Music Orchestra and then with the Kolisch Quartet. He and his family moved to Albuquerque, New Mexico in the early 1940s, where Frederick joined the faculty at the University of New Mexico.

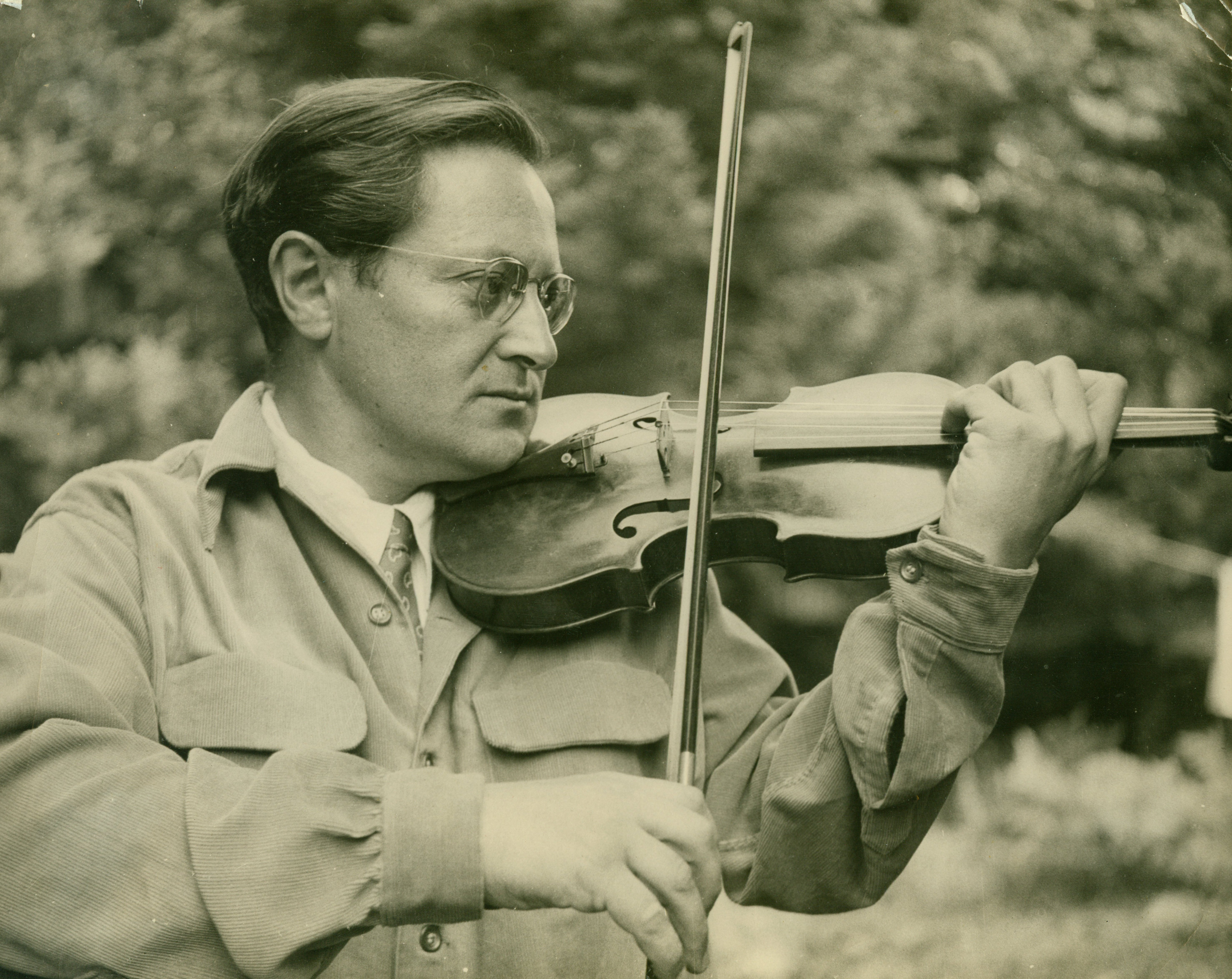

His mother, Ernestine Fuchsgelb, was murdered in Auschwitz in 1944.

In 1945, Frederick replaced William Kunkel as the conductor of the New Mexico Symphony Orchestra, originally founded in 1932 as the Albuquerque Civic Symphony.

== World premieres ==
In 1947, Frederick managed to convince world-renowned Austrian-American composer Arnold Schoenberg to commission the premiere of his work "A Survivor from Warsaw,“ his memorial to the victims of the Holocaust, for the Albuquerque Civic Symphony (ACS).Frederick had worked to acquire the world premiere through an arrangement he made with Schoenberg in which Frederick agreed to produce copied parts of the score and send them back to the composer. Frederick conducted the Schoenberg premiere with the ACS on November 4, 1948

Frederick also presented the world premiere of Ernst Krenek's Fifth Symphony in 1950, a collaboration which Krenek documented in his 1951 tribute article entitled "An Exceptional Musician: Kurt Frederick."

== Career highlights ==
Frederick also played a part in the creation of the Albuquerque Youth Symphony and served as its first conductor.

On February 17, 1954, Kurt Frederick and cellist Lev Aronson appeared as surprise guests on the NBC-TV show This Is Your Life which was celebrating their colleague cantor Gregor Shelkan. All three of these European-born musicians had escaped the Holocaust.

Frederick received his PhD in Philosophy of Music from the Eastman School of Music in 1957.

In 1972, maestro Frederick, Dr. Edward T. Peter and others founded The Southwest Albuquerque Opera Theatre, now known as Opera Southwest[19].

In 1977, Kurt Frederick was a recipient of one of The Governor's Awards for Excellence in the Arts.[18]

In 1979, he was also awarded an honorary doctoral degree by the University of New Mexico.

== Symphonies conducted ==
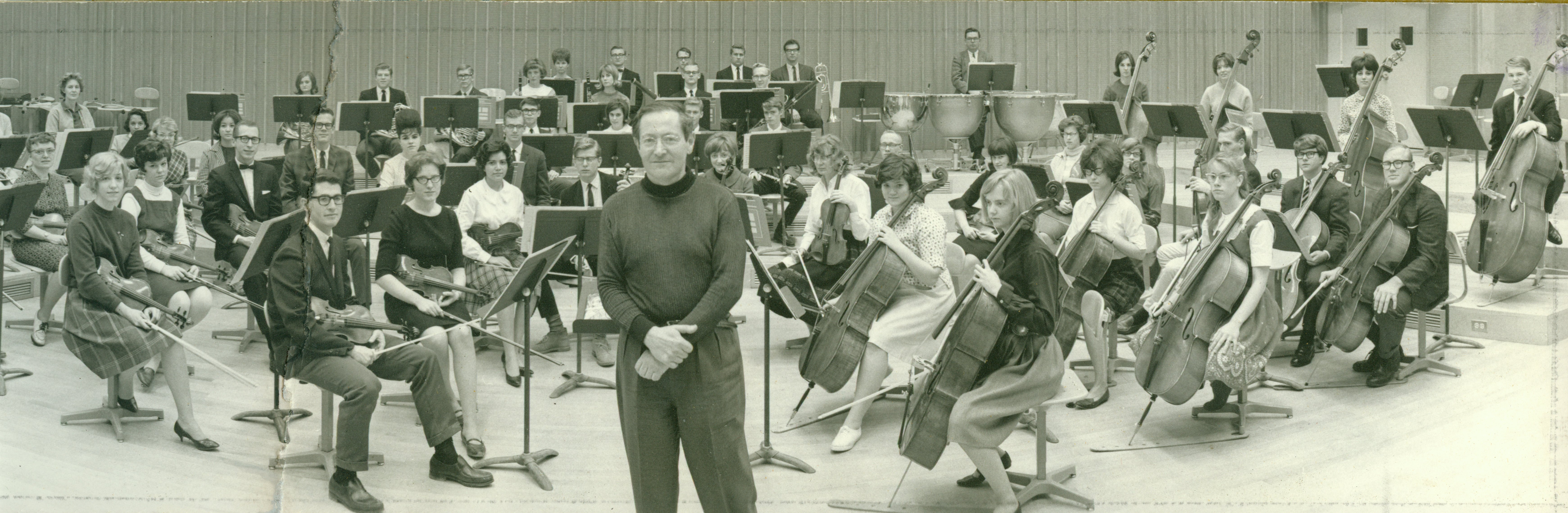

Kurt Frederick was a conductor in the following orchestras:

- New Mexico Chamber Orchestra
- Civic Symphony Orchestra, which became the Albuquerque Civic Symphony Orchestra
- Youth Symphony Orchestra
- University of New Mexico Orchestra

== Oral history ==
In this 1968 interview, Kurt Frederick talks about his introduction to Arnold Schoenberg’s "A Survivor from Warsaw." and his ensuing correspondence with the composer in order to perform the premiere of the work in New Mexico.Frederick also reflects on his life as a refugee as well his career as conductor of the Albuquerque Civic Symphony Orchestra.

== Remembrance and legacy ==
The University of New Mexico's College of Fine Arts dedicated one of its main concert halls to honor the school's longtime conductor, naming it Kurt Frederick Hall.

Also to honor his memory, an annual endowed scholarship was established in Kurt Frederick's name providing assistance to main campus undergraduate students.
