= Paul Lange (musician) =

German musician and teacher

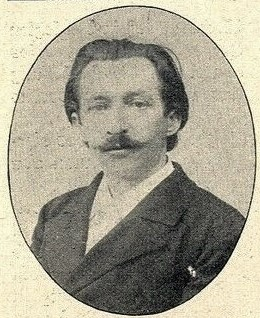
- Lange in 1906
- Born: 12 October 1857; Kartzow, Prussia
- Died: 2 December 1919 (aged 62); Üsküdar, Ottoman Empire (modern-day Istanbul, Turkey)
- Resting place: Feriköy Protestant Cemetery, Istanbul
- Citizenship: Prussian, since 1916 German
- Education: Teacher, organist
- Alma mater: Lehrerseminar Neuruppin, Kaiserliche Akademie für Kirchenmusik Berlin
- Occupations: music teacher, conductor
- Children: Hans Lange and three other children

Paul Lange (12 October 1857 – 2 December 1919) was a German musician, teacher, orchestra and choir leader living and working in Istanbul. Lange "europeanized" Turkish military music and was one of the pioneers to bring German and European classical music to the Ottoman capital in the years between 1880 and 1920.

== Life ==
Lange was born in Kartzow, Prussia, the descendant of an old Prussian teacher family. He was trained at the teacher's college in Neuruppin to become a school teacher. He graduated from that college in 1879 with honors. Because of his high musical skills, he was then admitted to the "Royal Academic Institute for Church Music" in Berlin, where he received training as a church organist.

In 1880, Lange moved to Constantinople, where he assumed a position as music teacher at the German School (Alman Lisesi) as well as organist of the Chapel of the German Embassy.

Subsequently, Lange also became a music teacher at various other institutes of higher education in Constantinople, including several Greek and Armenian high schools (lycées) as well as American colleges such as Robert College and American College for Girls.

Lange became a successful piano teacher and subsequently also formed his private conservatory, which however had to declare bankruptcy after two years. He transformed an existing Italian orchestra into a large German-style symphony orchestra with which he conducted the first performances ever of Beethoven symphonies and Wagner operas in the Ottoman Empire, with enormous success.

Finally, during his visit to Constantinople in 1898, Kaiser Wilhelm II, who had already appointed him a "Kaiserlicher Musikdirektor" in 1894, became aware of Lange and helped him gain a position as head of a naval military orchestra of the Ottoman Navy. Subsequently, he took over several other military ensembles, before finally being appointed Director of the Sultan's music after the revolution in 1908. Since then Lange carried the Ottoman Court title "Bey". As a member of the Ottoman court, Lange was allowed to stay in Istanbul by the Allied Military Administration when all other Germans and Austrians were deported from the city. When Lange died in Üsküdar, Ottoman Empire, in December 1919, he received a state funeral, and the British Embassy chaplain performed the funeral at Feriköy Protestant Cemetery. However, his widow and his youngest daughter, who had stayed with him in Istanbul, were deported to Germany only a few months later in May 1920.

Paul Lange's oldest son was German-American conductor Hans Lange (assistant of Arturo Toscanini in New York City, later conductor at the Chicago Symphony Orchestra, best known for numerous recordings with the Wagner soprano Kirsten Flagstad).

Paul Lange was a close friend of fellow German lecturer Dr Friedrich Schrader, also a faculty member at Robert College in the 1890s.
