= Albuquerque Youth Symphony =

- Abbreviation: AYSP
- Location: Dale E. Kempter Center for Music Education 4407 Menaul Blvd NE Albuquerque, NM 87110
- Key people: Eric Rombach-Kendall

The Albuquerque Youth Symphony is an organization in Albuquerque, New Mexico, that seeks to implement a passion for music in young musical students. Founded in 1955, the Albuquerque Youth Symphony is one of the oldest youth symphony programs in the United States today. Dan Whisler is the current director.

== History ==
Founded in 1955 between Albuquerque Public Schools and the University of New Mexico, Dr. Kurt Frederick was the very first conductor of the youth symphony, which included students of grades 7–12. Several years later, due to the popularity of the group, the program divided the symphony into two groups: the Albuquerque Junior Orchestra, which was for grades 7–9, and the Albuquerque Youth Symphony for older students grades 10–12.

Over the years, the program expanded to include two middle school groups, the Albuquerque Junior Symphony and the Albuquerque Junior Orchestra, and two high school groups, the Albuquerque Youth Symphony and Albuquerque Youth Orchestra.

== Orchestras ==
The Albuquerque Youth Symphony program consists of eight different groups: one elementary school group, four middle school groups, and three high school groups. To be eligible for participation in the Albuquerque Youth Symphony Program, students must live within a 50-mile (80-kilometre) radius of Albuquerque.

=== Youth symphony ===
The program's premier ensemble, youth symphony (YS) contains students in high school (grades 9–12). It requires an audition each year to be a part of it regardless of prior participation in the symphony, with each hopeful musician auditioning with two chosen excerpts, scales, and a solo of the student's choice. The Albuquerque Youth Symphony goes on tour each year. The tours have a three-year cycle: the first tour in the cycle is small, with the group going to a nearby state. The second tour goes further away, but stays within the country, while the third tour goes to another country. The Albuquerque Youth Symphony has toured Brazil, the Czech Republic and, in the summer of 2009, went to Australia and New Zealand. In the summer of 2012, AYS traveled to Austria, Germany and the Czech Republic. In the summer of 2014, AYS traveled to New York City and performed in Carnegie Hall, as well as including two flash mobs in the city.

=== Youth orchestra ===
This is the second high school orchestra. The orchestra's skill level is slightly lower than that of the youth symphony. They must also audition with orchestral excerpts, scales, and a solo of their choice. Again, the youth orchestra (AYO) allows all students that live within a 50-mile radius of Albuquerque. The Albuquerque Youth Orchestra also tours to other places in the winter or spring, usually within the state or to a nearby state. In the winter of 2010, the youth orchestra travelled to Carlsbad and Clovis, New Mexico. In the spring of 2011, AYO travelled to Pagosa Springs and Durango, Colorado.

=== Youth concert orchestra ===
This is the third high school orchestra. The concert orchestra's skill level is slightly lower than that of the youth orchestra, and students wishing to audition solely for YCO must play a solo and scales. Excerpts are not required.

=== Junior symphony ===
This is the middle school group with the most experience. In the 2009–2010 season, the program began to accept students from the 9th grade into this group. The junior symphony (JS) contains students in grades 6–8. Though they do not tour to other places, they tour to one Albuquerque Public School every year to perform for the students there. This group requires an audition with scales and a solo of the student's choice and sightreading.

=== Junior orchestra ===
The Albuquerque Junior Orchestra (JO) is the second middle school full orchestra. It is similar to the junior symphony, but has less-experienced musicians. Auditions similar to that of the junior symphony are required to be a part of the Albuquerque Junior Orchestra.

=== Junior string orchestra ===
The junior string orchestra (JSO) is a middle school group composed only of string players (violin, viola, violoncello, and string bass). They are for the least-experienced string players that audition for the junior symphony or orchestra.

=== Junior band ===
The junior band's (JB) auditions are separate from the Albuquerque Junior Symphony's. The junior band takes place only over the spring semester (January–April), and is only for musicians who play woodwind instruments (flute, oboe, clarinet, bassoon, saxophone), brass instruments (trumpet, horn, trombone, tuba), and percussion instruments.

=== Preparatory strings ===
The only elementary school group, the preparatory orchestra (PSO) does not require an audition. However, it does require a letter of recommendation from the student's teacher. It is only for students in grades 3–5 who play string instruments.

== Fundraisers ==
In order to fund the Albuquerque Youth Symphony program and the youth symphony's annual tour and capital campaign, the program uses two big fundraising events.

=== Luminarias ===
Luminarias are sold by the Albuquerque Youth Symphony to raise money for each individual musician to pay for their tour. Every year on a specific date, all members of the Albuquerque Youth Symphony get together at a workhouse and fill hundreds of luminarias to deliver to people in the greater Albuquerque area. This is the biggest fundraiser that the youth symphony program performs.

=== Shirts ===
The Albuquerque Youth Symphony has three different kinds of T-shirts that they sell for $18.00 or $20.00 each. Though this is a small fundraiser, the youth symphony still benefits from the profits of the shirt commerce.

== See also ==
- List of youth orchestras in the United States
